= Braquet =

Variety of grape

- Grape (Vitis)
- Species: Vitis vinifera
- Also called: Brachet
- Notable regions: Bellet AOC (Provence (wine))
- VIVC number: 1657

Braquet (French pronunciation: [bʁakɛ]) is a red French wine grape variety grown predominantly in the Provence region of southeastern France, particularly in the Bellet Appellation d'origine contrôlée (AOC) where it is as both a blending and varietal grape in still and rosé wines. Also known as Brachet, the vine produces naturally low yields and light bodied wines that are delicately perfumed. Recent thought among ampelographers is that Braquet is not related to the more aromatic Italian wine grape of the Piedmont region known as Brachetto.

== History ==
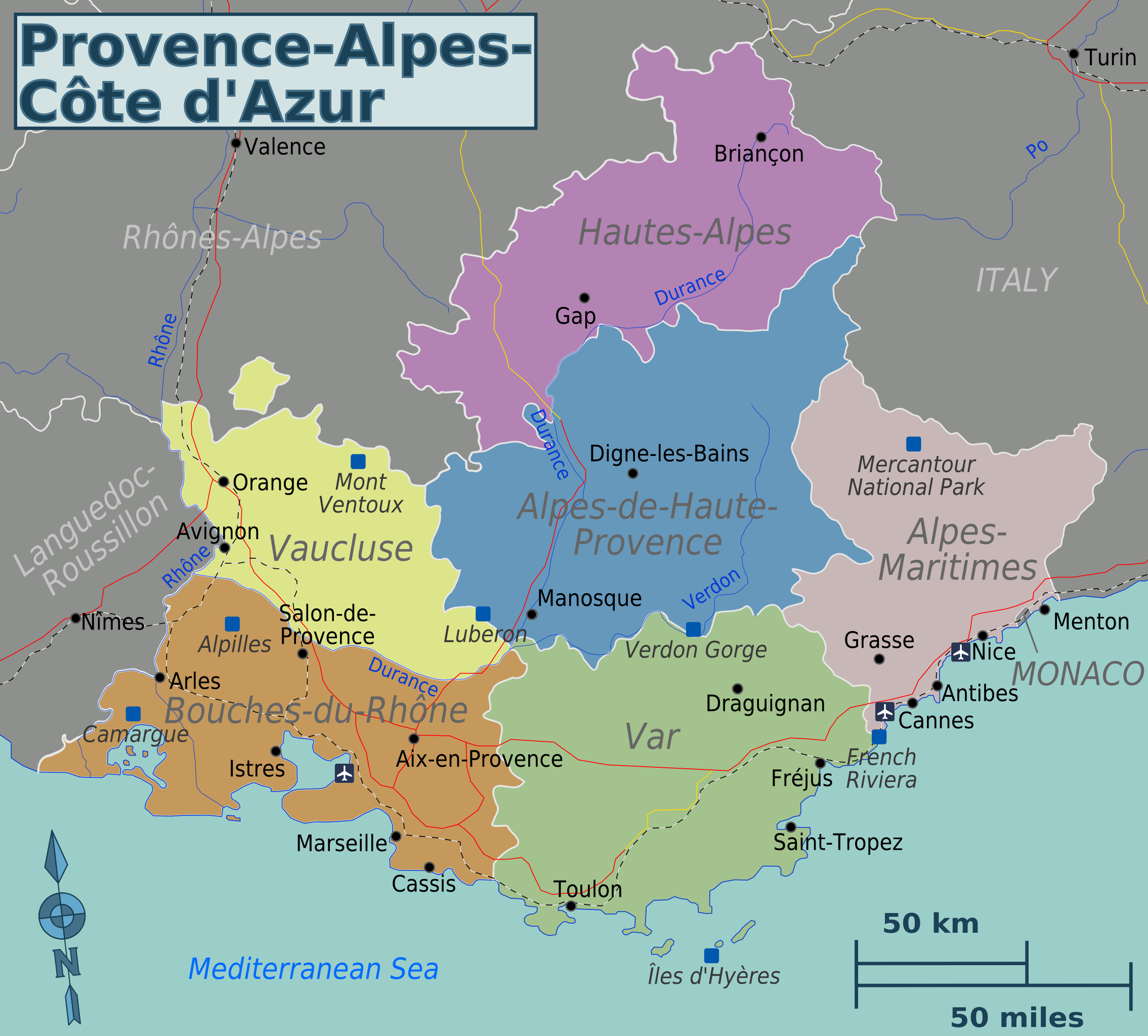
The Provence region where Braquet has historically been grown, mostly in the Alpes-Maritimes department around the towns of Cannes, Grasse and Nice.

Documents from 1783-1784 describe Braquet growing in the Provençal towns of Cannes, Grasse and Nice where it was said to be a good table grape and blending variety in the local wines. The exact origins of the name Braquet is unknown but Master of Wine Jancis Robinson speculates that it might be a local family name of one of the variety's original propagators.

== Viticulture ==
Braquet is a mid-ripening variety that naturally produces low harvest yields of medium-sized berries even without severe pruning. The variety tends to thrive on poor vineyard soils and in hot and dry conditions. The grape's main viticultural hazard is a susceptibility to botrytis.

== Wine regions and AOC regulations ==
In 2008 there were 30 acres (12 hectares) of Braquet planted in France, mostly around the town of Nice where the variety is known as Brachet. Here it is a permitted variety in the Bellet AOC where it is blended with Fuella Nera to make up at least 60% of the blend for the AOC red and rosé wines. Other varieties that can be blended with Braquet in Bellet include Grenache and Cinsault. Braquet grapes destined for AOC wine production in Bellet must be harvested to a yield no greater than 40 hectoliters/hectare with the finished wine needing to attain a minimum alcohol level of 10.5%

== Styles ==
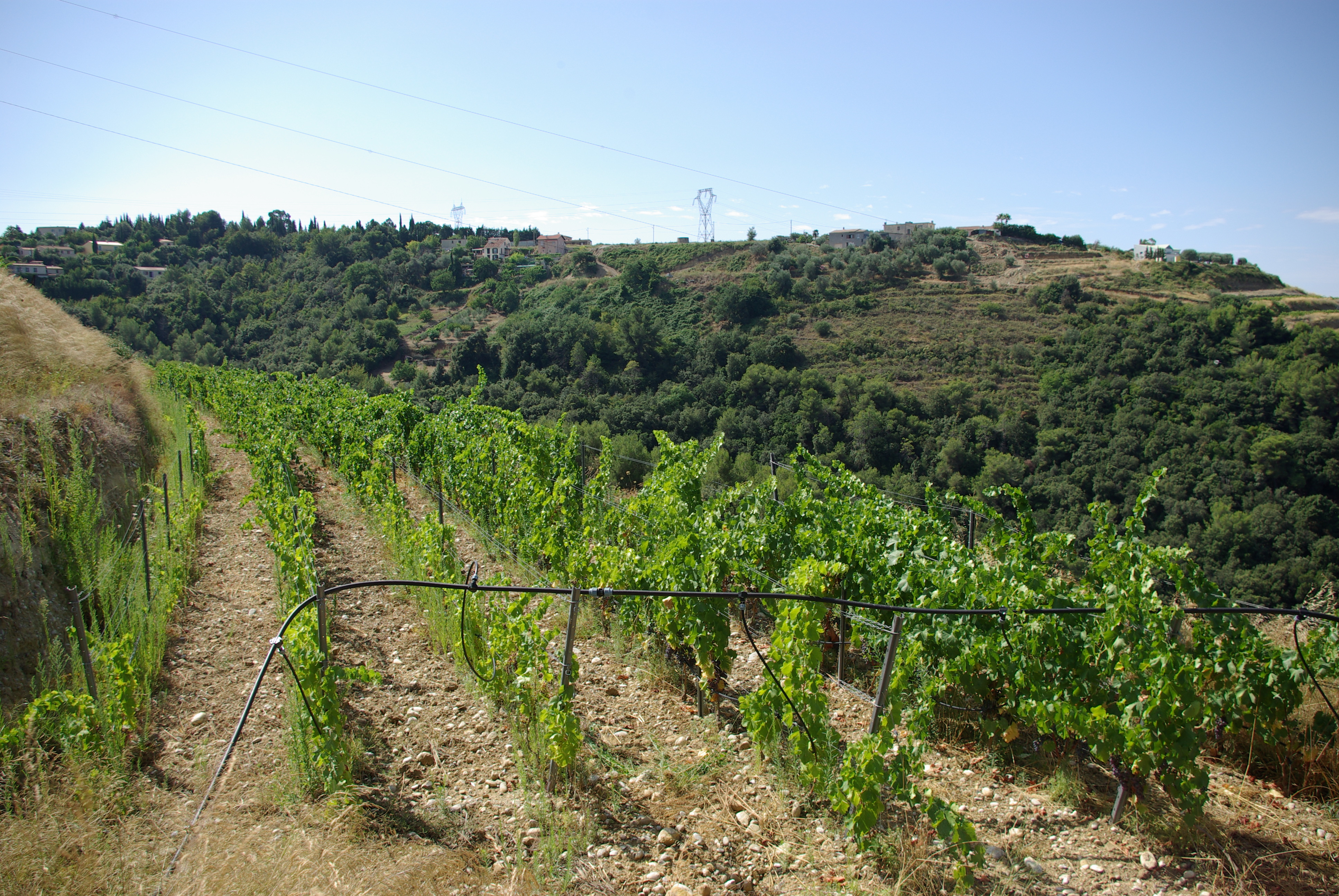
Vineyard in the Bellet AOC near Nice where Braquet is still grown today.

According to Jancis Robinson, Braquet tends to make a light bodied, slightly floral wine with very little color. While it is often used as a blending grape, its light pigment does lend itself well to rosé production which is what most varietal examples of Braquet tend to be.

== Relationship to other varieties ==
Due to the similarities in name, Braquet was often confused with the Piedmont wine grape Brachetto noted for the Denominazione di Origine Controllata e Garantita (DOCG) Brachetto d'Acqui. However DNA testing has confirmed that they are separate varieties. The Provençal grape Calitor is another variety that Braquet shares some synonyms with and is often confused for.

The white wine grape Braquet Blanc de Nice is a white color mutation of Braquet.

== Synonyms ==
Over the years Braquet has been known under a variety of synonyms including: Brachet (in Nice), Bracke, Calito du Languedoc, Canseron and Pecoui Touar du Var.
