= Brun Fourca =

Variety of grape

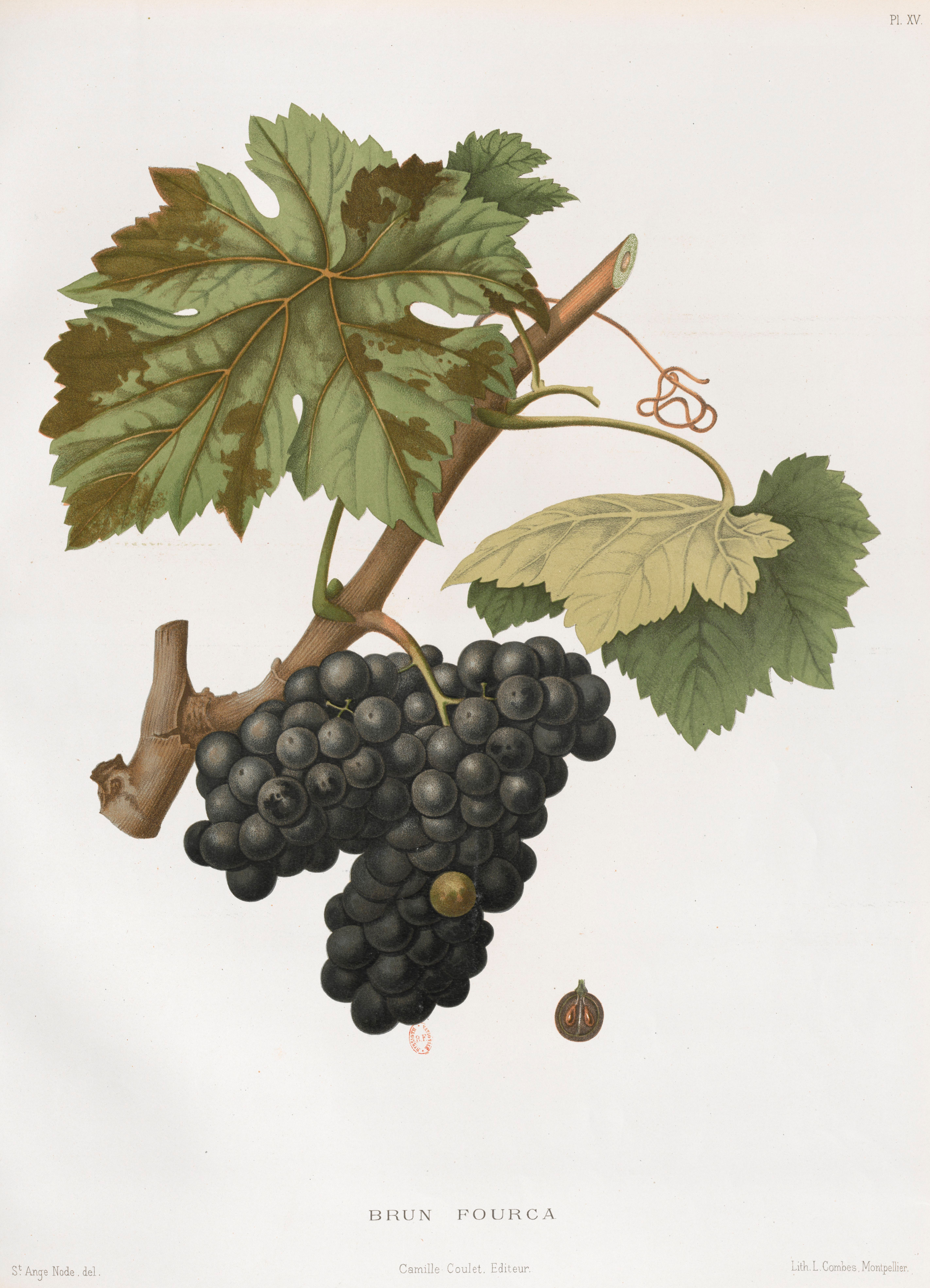
Lithograph of Brun Fourca.

Brun Fourca is a red French wine grape variety that once grew widely throughout Provence and Southwest France but is now limited to small plantings within the Palette Appellation d'Origine Contrôlée (AOC).

== History ==
The name Brun Fourca comes from the colour of the stems brun (or brown) and the characteristic "forked" (fourche) shape of the clusters with shoulder or "wing" branch of the cluster being of pronounced size and length in contrast to the main bunch stem. The first written mention of Brun Fourca was in a 1772 document where the name was used as a synonym for Pinot noir. Provençal records from 1783-1784 mention actual Brun Fourca planted in the communes of Aubagne and Aix-en-Provence in the Bouches-du-Rhône department.

== Viticulture ==
Brun Fourca is a mid-ripening variety that is highly prone to powdery mildew and botrytis rot. The vine produces small "forked" clusters of very large berries that easily fall off the rachis when the grapes are fully ripe.

== Wine regions and AOC regulations ==
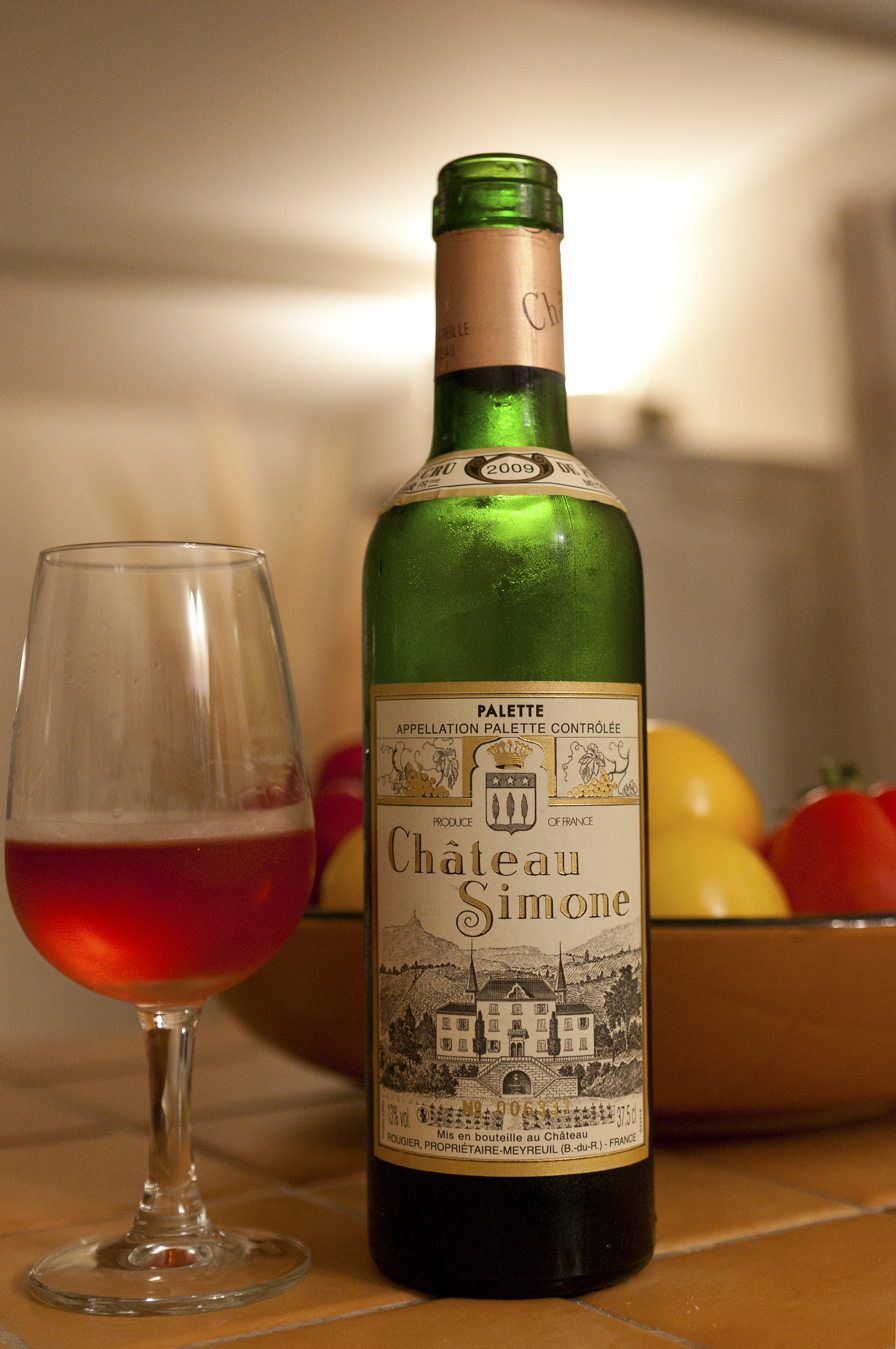
An AOC Palette wine from Château Simone, one of the few wine estates that claim to still be growing Brun Fourca.

While the grape was historically grown throughout the Provence, South West France and Languedoc wine regions, today it is nearly extinct with less than 2.5 acres (1 hectare) of the variety recorded in France in 2006. What is left is found almost entirely within the Palette AOC where two estates, Château Simone and Château Crémade, claim to still be using the grape in their red and rosé blends with Cinsault, Grenache and Mourvedre.

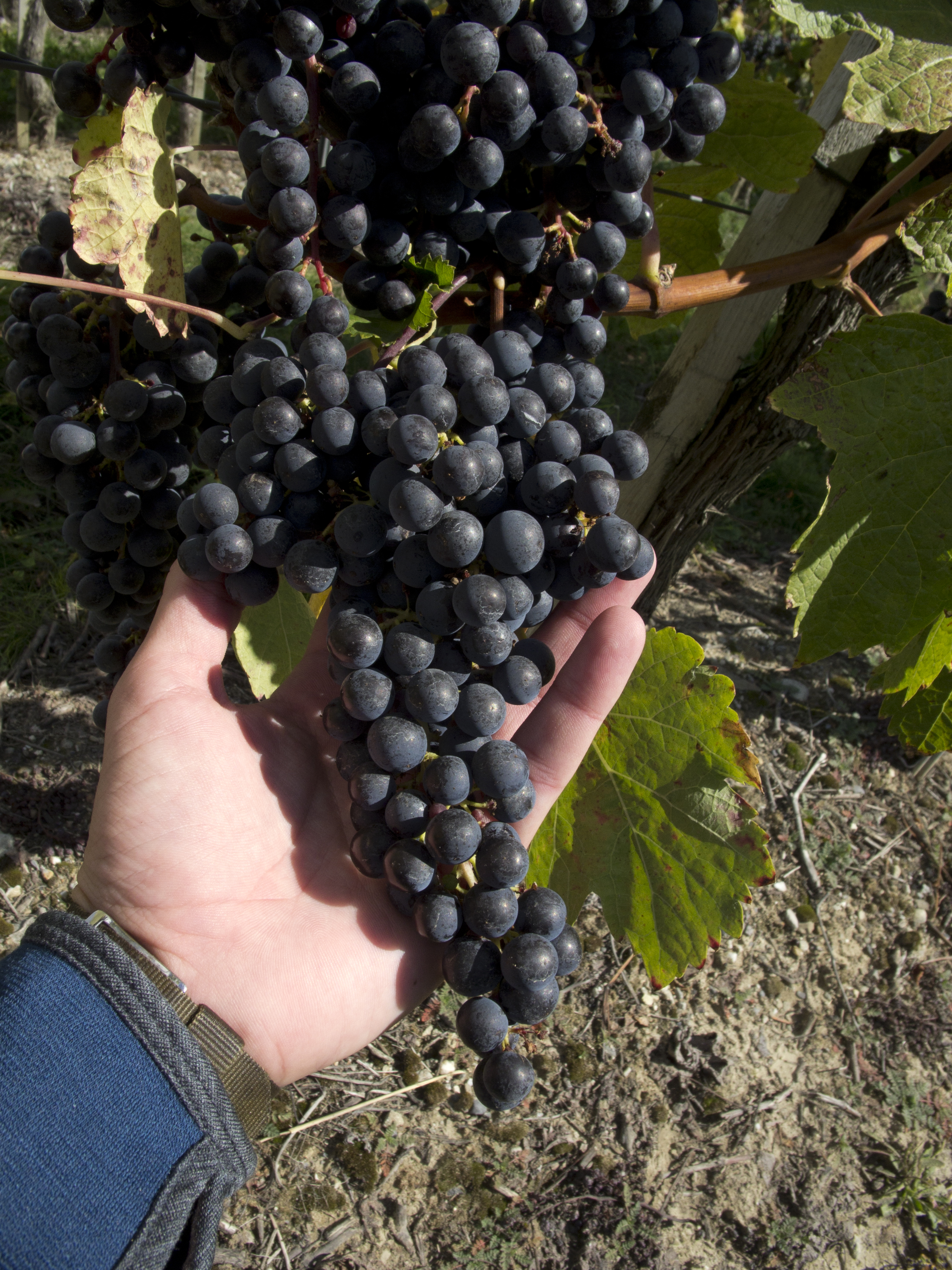
Brun Fourca has been historically confused with Pinot noir (pictured).

Brun Fourca grapes destined for AOC wine production must be harvested to a yield no greater than 40 hl/ha with the finished wine attaining a minimum alcohol level of at least 11%. In addition to Cinsault, Grenache and Mourvedre which must make up the majority of the wine, Brun Fourca can also be blended with Carignan, Castet, Manosquin, Muscat noir and Cabernet Sauvignon.

== Confusion with other varieties ==
Over the years plantings of Brun Fourca have been confused with other wine grape varieties due to either similarities in appearance of synonyms. These include the Burgundian wine grape Pinot noir, of which Brun Fourca was an 18th-century synonym, and the ancient Ardèche variety Chichaud.

== Synonyms ==
Among the synonyms that have been used to describe Brun Fourca and its wines include Brun d´Auriol, Brun de Farnous, Brun Farnous, Brun Tourcae, Brun Tourcale, Brunfourka, Caula, Caula Noir, Caula noir de Vaucluse, Farnous (in the Var department), Floura, Flouron (in the Drôme), Gros Taulier, Mançonnet (in Ardèche), Morrastel Fleuri, Morrastel Flourat, Moulan (in Hérault), Moulard, Moulau, Mourastel Flourat, Moureau (in Gard), Mourrastel Fleuri, Mourrastel-Flourat (in Hérault), Morrastel Floura, Mouzeau (in Gard), Mulon, Plant de Bordeaux and Plant Francais.
