= Sigoyer =

Sigoyer may refer to the following places in France:

- Sigoyer, Alpes-de-Haute-Provence, a commune in the department of Alpes-de-Haute-Provence
- Sigoyer, Hautes-Alpes, a commune in the department of Hautes-Alpes

== Other uses ==
- Sigoyer (grape), an alternative name for the French wine grape Calitor.
- Bouteillan noir, another French wine grape that is also known as Sigoyer.
