= Louis Roederer =

Champagne producer

Coordinates: 49.2600511°N 4.0337784°E

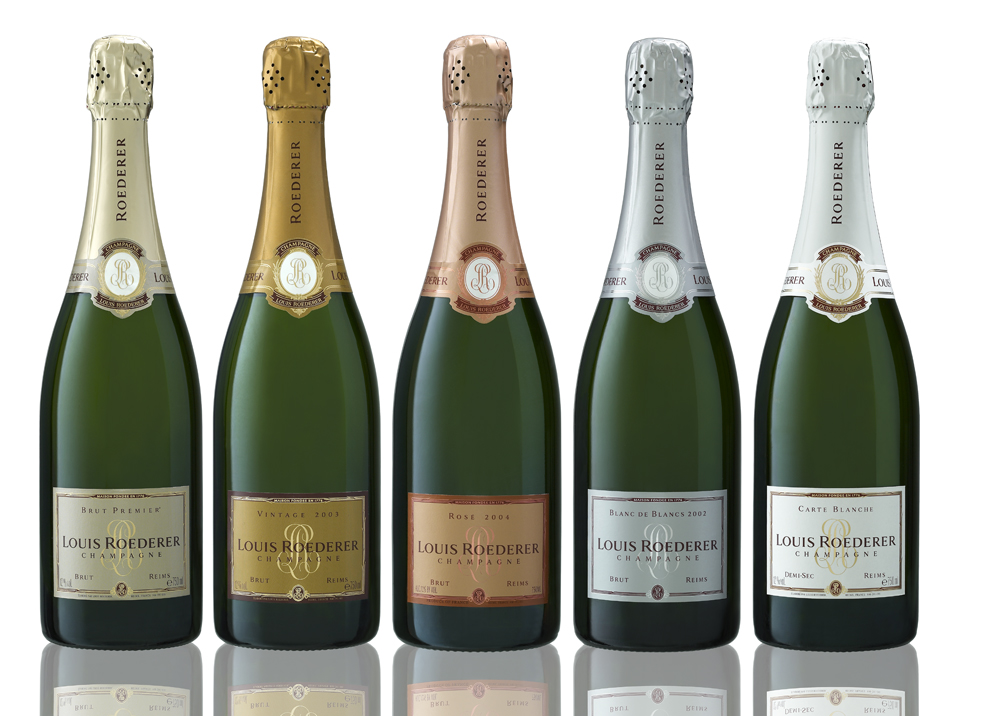
Louis Roederer champagne bottles

Louis Roederer is a producer of champagne based in Reims, France. Founded in 1776, the business was inherited and renamed by Louis Roederer in 1833. It remains as one of the few independent and family-run maisons de champagne (champagne houses). Over 3.5 million bottles of Louis Roederer champagne are shipped each year to more than 100 countries.

== History ==
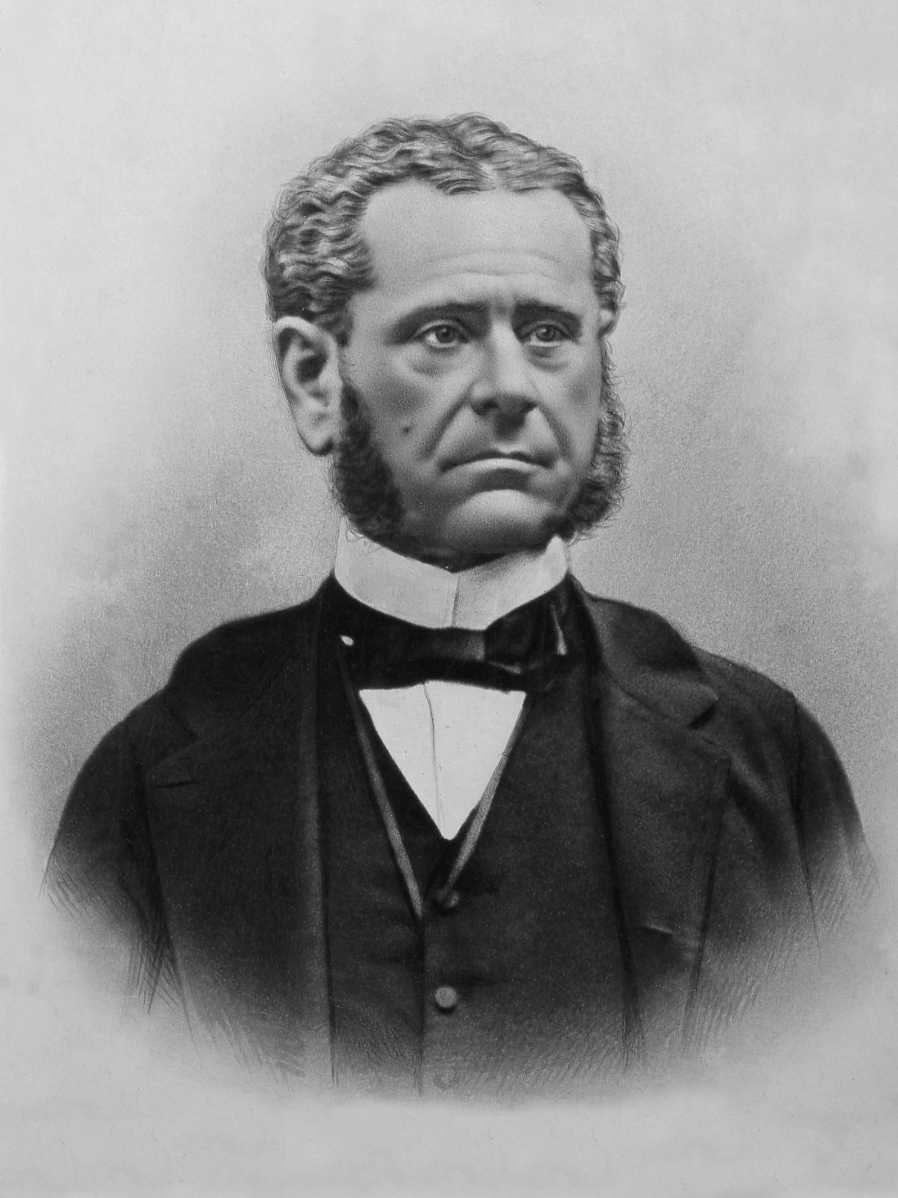
Louis Roederer (1809–1870)

Initially founded as Dubois Père & Fils in 1776, Louis Roederer inherited the company from his uncle in 1833, renamed it eponymously, and set out to target markets abroad. With concentrated efforts in several countries, including Russia. Tsar Nicholas II nominated Louis Roederer as the official wine supplier to the Imperial Court of Russia. Though the Russian Revolution and U.S. prohibition caused financial difficulties during the early 20th century, Roederer was re-established as a leading Grandes Marques producer and remains in descendants Rouzaud ownership. Cristal is a precursor prestige cuvée brand and was made commercially available in 1945. Former officers and generals of the Russian Imperial Army in exile, in Paris, continued to drink this champagne.

=== Family company ===
Louis Roederer remains one of the few family-owned independent companies run by real wine specialists. The stock ration in Louis Roederer's cellars represents between four and five years' sales.

== Production ==
From a vineyard area of 240 hectares (590 acres), Louis Roederer produces two thirds of the grapes needed for its production, sourcing the remaining required fruit from established farming contacts.

The vintage cuvées include the Vintage, Rosé Vintage, with Pinot noir and Chardonnay in an approximately 7:3 proportion, and the 100% Chardonnay Blanc de Blancs. The prestige cuvée Cristal, is a blend of around 40% Chardonnay and 60% Pinot noir. This prestige cuvée is also available as a rosé, which contains around 55% Pinot noir and 45% Chardonnay. Both Rosé Vintage and Cristal Rosé wines are made using the saignée method.

The total annual production of Roederer is approximately 3.5 million bottles, of which 70–80% is Louis Roederer Brut Premier.

== The wines ==
=== Non-vintage ===
==== Brut Premier ====
Brut Premier is a non-vintage Champagne combining at least four vintage wines in a blend of 40% Pinot Noir, 40% Chardonnay and 20% Pinot Meunier, the three main grape varieties allowed in the composition of Champagne, coming from more than fifty different crus. The inclusion of reserve wines (approximately 20%) matured in oak casks for several years gives the complexity and roundness characteristic of Louis Roederer's champagnes. It is aged for three years in Louis Roederer's cellars and left for six months after dégorgement (disgorging). The dosage (residual sugar) is 9g/L.

==== Carte Blanche ====
The Carte Blanche Cuvée is also produced from three varieties : 40% Pinot Noir, 40% Chardonnay, 20% Meunier. The main difference between Brut Premier and Carte Blanche is the dosage. Carte Blanche is a Demi Sec style. Five per cent of Carte Blanche comes from wine matured in oak tuns. It is aged for three years in Louis Roederer's cellars and left for six months after dégorgement (disgorging).

=== Vintages ===
In Champagne, a vintage Champagne (Champagne Millésimé in French) is a champagne composed entirely of wines of the same year.

==== Vintage ====
Brut Vintage is composed of 70% Pinot Noir from the Montagne de Reims and 30% Chardonnay, 30% of which is wine matured in oak barrels without malolactic fermentation. It is aged, on average, for four years in Louis Roederer’s cellars and left for six months after dégorgement (disgorging) to attain perfect maturity.

==== Rosé Vintage ====
Produced using the saignée (skin contact) process after cold maceration, the Rosé Vintage is a blend of around 70% Pinot Noir and 30% Chardonnay, the percentage (20%) of wine matured in oak barrels without malolactic fermentation being smaller. The Rosé Vintage cuvée is aged for four years in Roederer's cellars and left for six months after dégorgement (disgorging) to attain perfect maturity. This Chardonnay comes mostly from Cumières, on the bank of the River Marne.

==== Blanc de Blancs Vintage ====
Blanc de Blancs Vintage is composed of 100% Chardonnay and produced in the heart of the Côte des Blancs, in the kingdom of two Grands Crus: Cramant and Avize. The Chardonnay from these vineyards has subtlety. It is aged for five years and then six more months after disgorging (dégorgement) to attain maturity.

=== Cuvée de Prestige ===
==== Cristal ====
The first Cuvée de Prestige (Prestige Cuvée) of Champagne was created in 1876 by Louis Roederer to satisfy the demanding tastes of Tsar Alexander II and is called Cristal, referring to the aspect of the bottle. In 1876, Tsar Alexander II pointed out to his sommelier that the design of a standard champagne bottle made the beautiful color and effervescence invisible to the eye. He therefore requested of Roederer that his personal cuvée be served in bottles made of transparent crystal glass with a flat bottom (to foil the insertion of explosives in the indentation by would-be assassins), to remedy this defect. Thus was Cristal born, and the first notion of a premium cuvée. For more than a century, the appearance of the patented Cristal bottle has remained unchanged. After the fall of the Russian monarchy in 1917, the House of Louis Roederer decided to continue producing Cristal and to market it internationally.

Cristal is produced during the best years, when the Chardonnay (40%) and Pinot Noir (60%) grapes have attained optimum maturity. Cristal is aged for six years in Louis Roederer's cellars and left for a further eight months after disgorging (dégorgement).

In November 2024, it was reported that Singapore Airlines will be the sole airline serving Cristal 2015 champagne beginning 1 December 2024, through an exclusive agreement with Louis Roederer.

==== Cristal Rosé ====
Cristal Rosé is created almost with the same proportions as the Cristal: a blend of 55% Pinot Noir and 45% Chardonnay, comprising 20% of wine matured in oak barrels. The Rosé aspect of Cristal Rosé is produced using the saignée (skin contact) process after cold maceration. The Cristal Rosé cuvée is aged, on average, for six years in Louis Roederer's cellars and left for a minimum of eight months after disgorging (dégorgement).

== Acquisitions ==
The Roederer portfolio also holds Bordeaux estates Château de Pez and Château Haut-Beausejour in Saint Estèphe. In late 2006, the Rouzaud family acquired majority share in the second-growth estate Château Pichon Longueville Comtesse de Lalande. The deal also included the Cru Bourgeois estate Château Bernadotte.

Also included in the Roederer Group are Champagne Deutz, Ramos Pinto Port in Portugal, Domaines Ott in Provence, Roederer Estate, Scharffenberger Cellars, Merry Edwards Winery, Domaine Anderson, and Diamond Creek Vineyards in California.

=== Vineyards ===
The 240 hectares of Louis Roederer's vineyards are distributed across the three main Champagne growing zones, the Montagne de Reims, the Vallée de la Marne, and the Côte des Blancs. Louis Roederer's vineyards cover two thirds of the company's needs, which is rare for a Champagne House. This situation gives Louis Roederer greater control over its production. Seventy five hectares are cultivated according to biodynamic principles, which makes it the largest biodynamic estate in the Champagne region.

In 2021, Louis Roederer was awarded with Robert Parker Green Emblem.

The Robert Parker Green Emblem is given in recognition of the most extraordinary cases of sustainable efforts in the wine industry. This distinction is awarded to wineries that have achieved outstanding commitment to sustainable viticulture after a thorough audit by the experts at Robert Parker Wine Advocate. It distinguishes producers that are committed to the long-term protection of the environment and biodiversity.

115 hectares of its historic vineyards have now become eligible for organic growing certification – the grapes of the 2021 harvest issued from these plots will have official “AB” organic certification (the organic certification symbol in France).

== Winemaking ==
Every year, about 600 people are employed to pick the grapes in the Louis Roederer vineyards. The vintage lasts for ten to fifteen days. Tractors transport the grapes in 50 kg baskets from the vineyards to Louis Roederer's own press-houses in the heart of the vineyards. The musts obtained from the pressing are then transported to Louis Roederer's cellars in Reims. Upon arrival in Reims the musts are delivered either into small stainless steel tanks or into oak vats, no bigger than the equivalent of one to two hectares of vineyards, and there they begin their fermentation. The characteristics and qualities of each plot are thus preserved right up to the blending stage. In winter, each wine is tasted by the Cellar Master and his team of oenologists prior to blending and bottling in the spring.

== Reserve wines ==
Champagne is a blend of wines from different locations. Thanks to its vineyards, Louis Roederer has a stock of wines from which to create its cuvées. Not all of these wines are used immediately. Some are set aside to age in large oak casks in the reserve wine cellar; later they will either be included in blends of Louis Roederer's Brut Premier champagne to ensure quality, or be used for the dosage in the liqueur d'expédition. The reserve wines destined for the liqueur d'expédition are selected from the best wines from each vintage. Pinot Noir and Chardonnay wines from eight to ten different crus are blended together and matured in oak vats for up to ten years. The reserve wine cellar contains several thousand liters of reserve wines.

== See also ==
- List of Champagne houses
- Veblen goods
