= Foll =

Foll may refer to:

- Harry Foll, an Australian politician
- Stéphane Le Foll, a French politician
- The Followers in Australian rules football
- Foll (Centuria), member of the Accursed Battalion in the Japanese web manga Centuria

== See also ==
- Folle
- Folles
