= Brachetto d'Acqui =

Geographically protected Italian wine

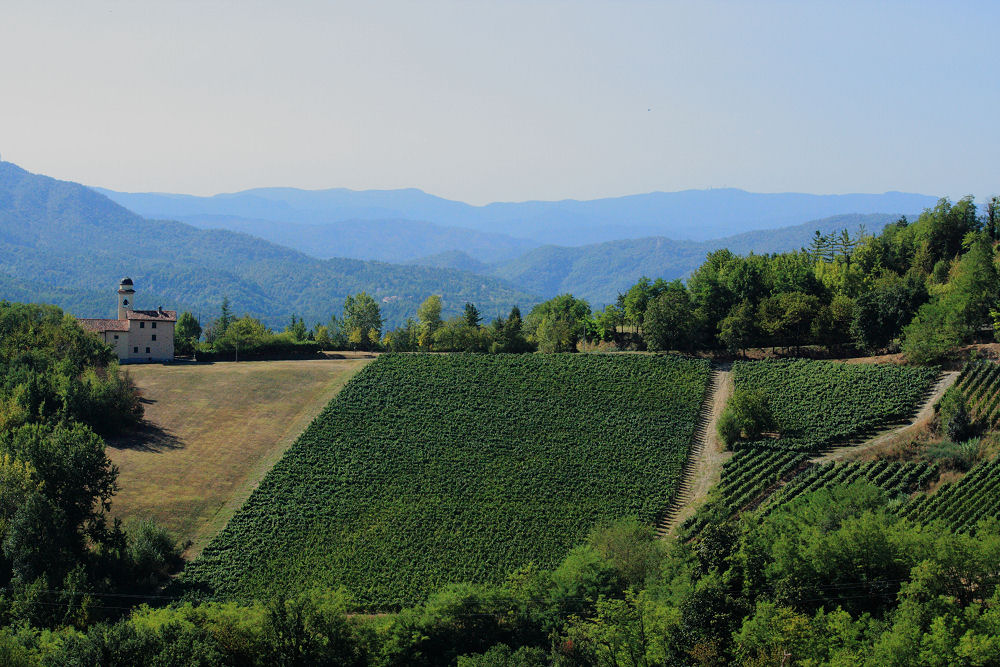
Vineyards in the Brachetto d'Acqui DOCG region of Piedmont.

Brachetto d'Acqui (Italian: [braˈketto ˈdakkwi]; Piedmontese: brachet d'Àich [braˌkɛt ˈdɑjk]) is a red Italian wine that is classified as a Denominazione di Origine Controllata e Garantita (DOCG) since 1996 and previously a Denominazione di Origine Controllata (DOC) region since 1969. It is produced in the Piedmont wine region around Acqui Terme in the province of Alessandria with some overlap into the province of Asti. The wine is produced from the Brachetto grape, a variety that is believed to be native to Piedmont, and can be still or sparkling with usually some sweetness.

== History ==
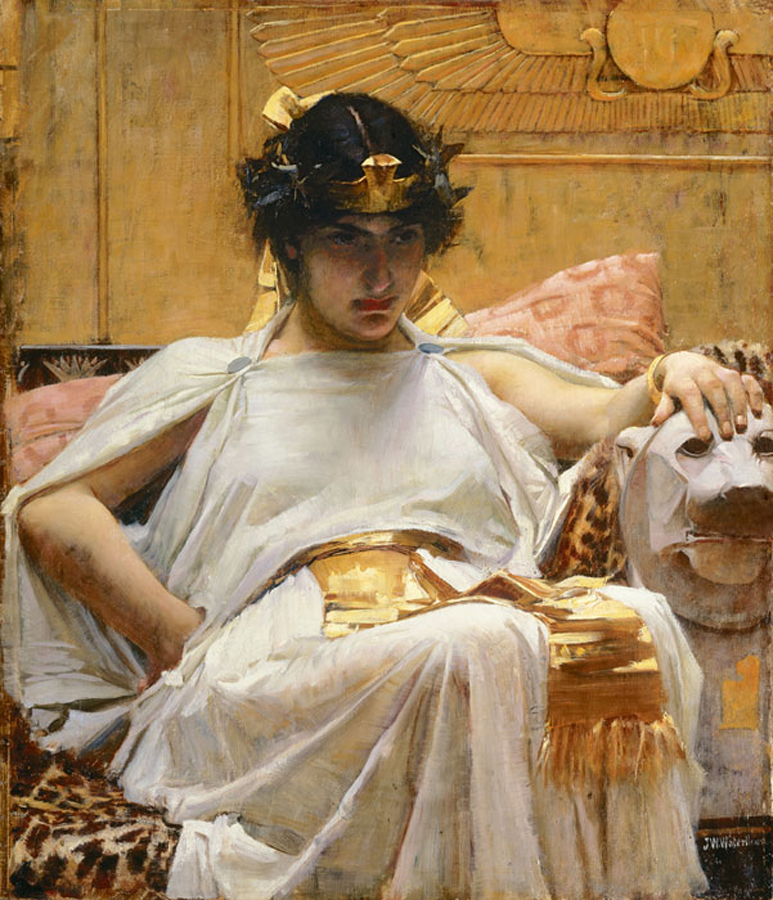
According to legend, Julius Caesar and Marc Antony presented Cleopatra (pictured) with several gourds of vinum acquense, an early fore-bearer of Brachetto d'Acqui.

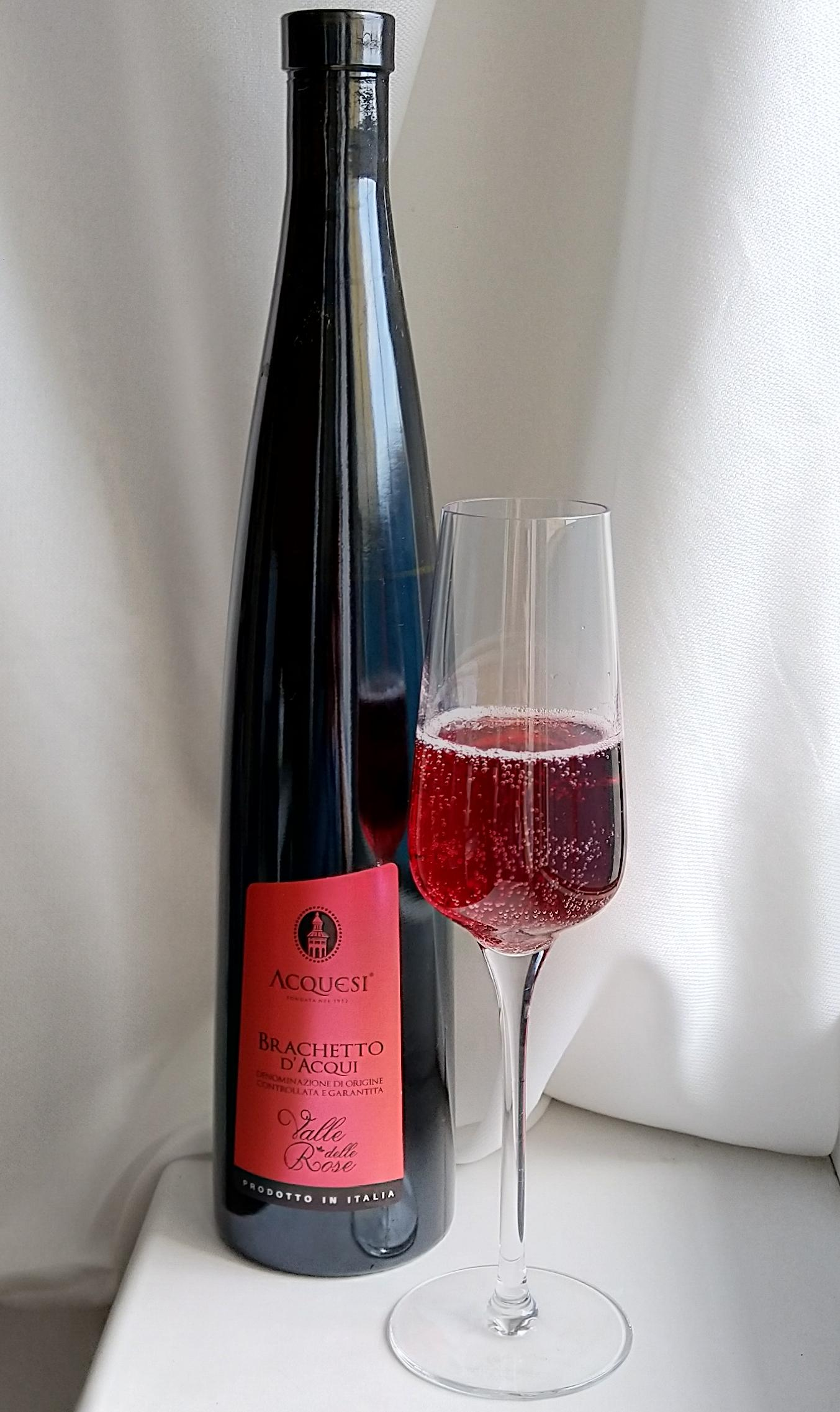
Brachetto d'Acqui

The exact origins of the wine are unknown. While the Brachetto grape is believed to be native to Piedmont (with the Monferrato hills and the area around Asti being the most likely home of the grape), some ampelographers have speculated as early as the late 19th century that the grape might actually be French in origin.

Still, the production of a sweet, frothy red wine from this region has long tradition. In the Italian theater tradition of Commedia dell'arte, the mask character of Gianduja da Gioan d'laduja or Giovanni of the Jug, which represented Turin and Piedmont is said to have preferred Brachetto d'Acqui among all others. Even prior, in the times of Ancient Rome, writers were describing a wine Gallia Cisalpina (northern Italy) known as vinum acquense (wine of the Acqui) that was a favorite among patricians with its sweet flavors and high aromatics. Legend also had it that Julius Caesar and Marc Antony presented Cleopatra several gourds of vinum acquense as a gift. Also, according to legend, the Pharaoh believed that the wine had the power to unleash the passions of her lovers.

== Wine region ==
The DOCG zone of Brachetto d'Acqui include the Monferrato hills that extend southeast from the town of Asti with some overlap into the Asti DOCG zone. The region includes the valleys along the Bormida and Belbo rivers as they flow into the Tanaro. The communes of Acqui Terme and Strevi are at the heart of the winemaking region.

== DOCG regulations ==
Under DOCG regulations Brachetto d'Acqui must be produced from 100% Brachetto grapes that were harvested at no more than 8 tonnes/hectare. Prior to promotion to DOCG status, other red Piedmont varieties (such as Dolcetto, Pinot nero, Freisa, Grignolino and Ruché) could be blended in with limited percentages. While the minimum alcohol levels for the finished wines must be at least 5% for frizzante and 6% for spumante the grapes used for Brachetto d'Acqui must attain enough ripeness for potential alcohol of at least 11.5% for frizzante and 12% for spumante (a brix sugar level between 21–22°Bx).

== Wine styles ==
Master of Wine Mary Ewing-Mulligan describes Brachetto d'Acqui as a very aromatic sweet red wine that can have floral and fruit notes similar to Moscato d'Asti and Lambrusco.
