= Téoulier =

Variety of grape

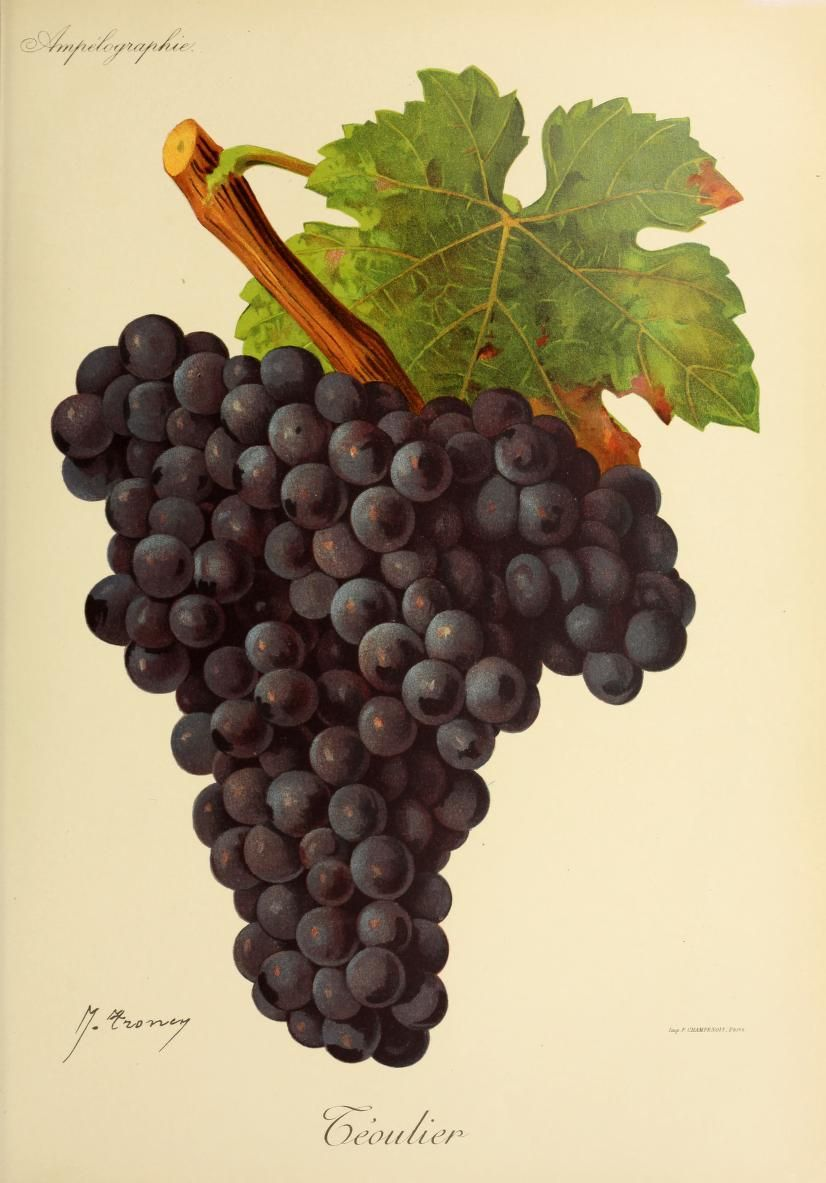
Image of a Téoulier

Téoulier is a red French wine grape variety found in south east France. Ampelographers speculate that the grape may have originated around the Provençal town of Manosque due to the town's close association with several synonyms of the variety. For most of the 20th century, plantings of Téoulier have steadily declined and today is rarely found.

There is also a white mutation of the variety known as Téoulier blanc.

== Wine regions ==
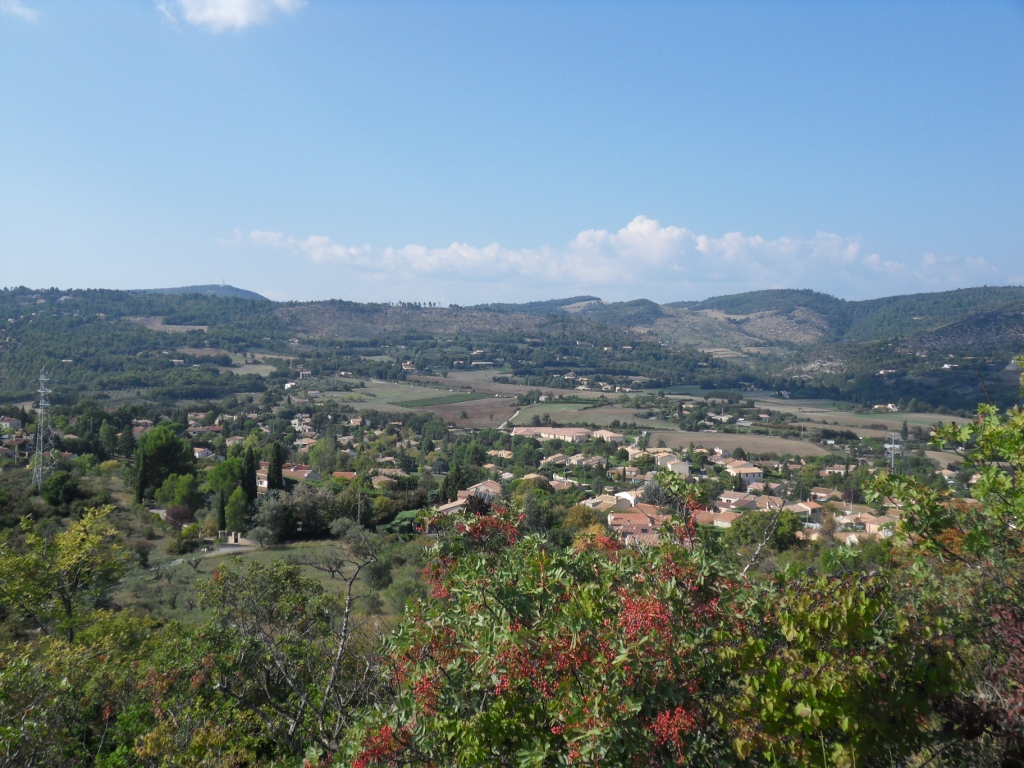
Ampelographer speculate that Téoulier may have originated around the town of Manosque (pictured) just north of the Palette AOC where the grape is still a permitted variety in the red and rosé wines of the region.

Téoulier is a permitted variety in the red and rosé wines of the Palette AOC where it is known as Manosquin. Here it is primarily blended with Grenache, Mourvedre and Cinsault which collectively must make up at least 80% of the wine. Manosquin is permitted up to a maximum of 20% as a minor component along with Syrah, Carignan Castets, Muscat noir and Cabernet Sauvignon.

== Synonyms ==
Among the synonyms that Téoulier has been known as over the years include: Brun, Grand Téoulier, Gros Teoulier, Manosquen, Manosquin, Petit Téoulier, Petit Thuilier, Petit Thulier, Plant de Manosque, Plant de Porto, Plant Dufour, Taurier, Teinturier Téoulier, Thuillier, Teoulie, Teoulier, Thuilier, Thuillier Noir and Trouillère.
