= Pascal blanc =

Variety of grape

Pascal blanc is a white French wine grape variety grown in the Provence region of southern France. While once more widely planted, this ancient Provençal variety is nearly extinct with only a few plantings left in the Appellation d'Origine Contrôlée (AOC) region of Cassis and some hectares used for experimental vin de pays.

== Viticulture ==
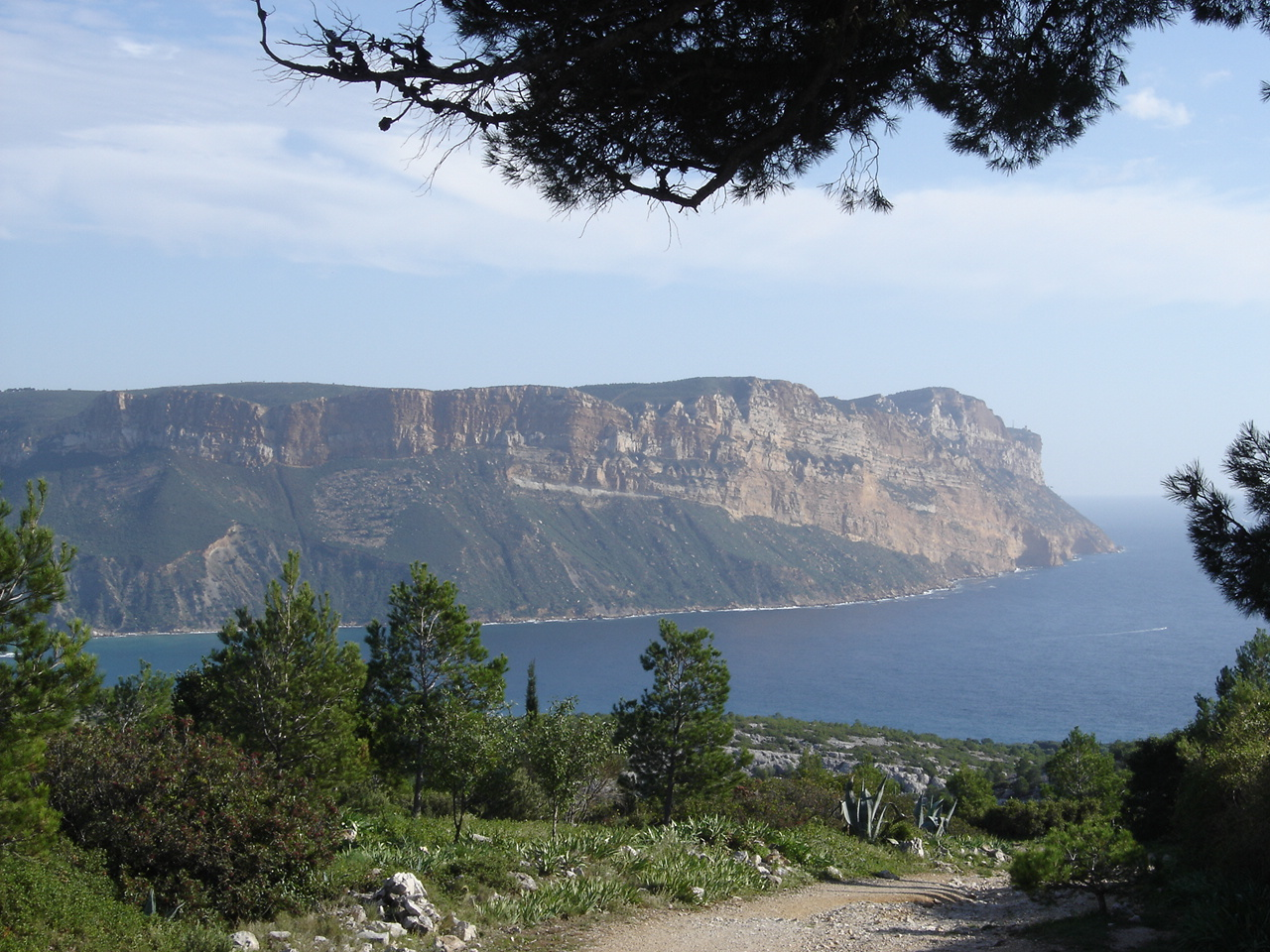
The southern France wine region of Cassis (pictured) is one of the few places in the world that is still growing Pascal blanc.

The Pascal blanc vine is extremely sensitive to many grape diseases, particularly powdery mildew and grape rots. It is best suited for dry climates with well drained soils that can minimize some of the risk of developing rot. In the Cassis region, the vineyard soils that Pascal blanc tend to be found in are almost always rocky and dry.

== Synonyms ==
Over the years Pascal blanc and its wines have been known under a variety of synonyms including Brun Blanc, Jacobin violet, Ostertraube, Pascal, Pascaou Blanc, Plant Pascal and Plant Pascolu.
