= Domaines Ott =

French winery

Domaines Ott is a wine producer in Provence, France. It is unusual in that it comprises three separate wine estates: Clos Mireille in La Londe (part of Cotes de Provence La Londe AOP), Château de Selle in Draguignan (part of Cotes de Provence AOP), and Château Romassan in Le Castellet (part of Bandol AOP). It has been owned by the Louis Roederer champagne company since 2018. Their "Etoile" blend is one of the most expensive rosé wines in the world.

The company was founded in 1912 by Marcel Ott, an agricultural engineer from Alsace. He first purchased the Château de Selle winery near Draguignan. In 1930, he bought Clos Mireille near Brégançon, and finally in 1956, the family bought Château Romassan near Bandol, all in the Var department. Clos Mireille and Château de Selle are part of the 1955 Provence wine classification.

The company was purchased by the Louis Roederer company in 2018, however it continues to be managed by the Ott family.
