= Bouteillan noir =

Variety of grape

Bouteillan noir is a red French wine grape variety that is grown in the Provence wine region of southern France. While the grape has been recorded growing in the Vaucluse region since at least the early 18th century, today the grape is virtually extinct. Despite sharing synonyms with another Provençal grape, Calitor, and the Languedoc wine grape Aramon noir, Bouteillan noir has no known relationship with either of those variety. The white Provençal grape Colombaud (not to be confused with the Cognac and South African wine grape Colombard) was once thought to be a white berried color mutation of Bouteillan noir but research conducted by Linda Bisson of the University of California, Davis shows that while the two grapes are likely related, one is not a color mutation of the other.

== History ==
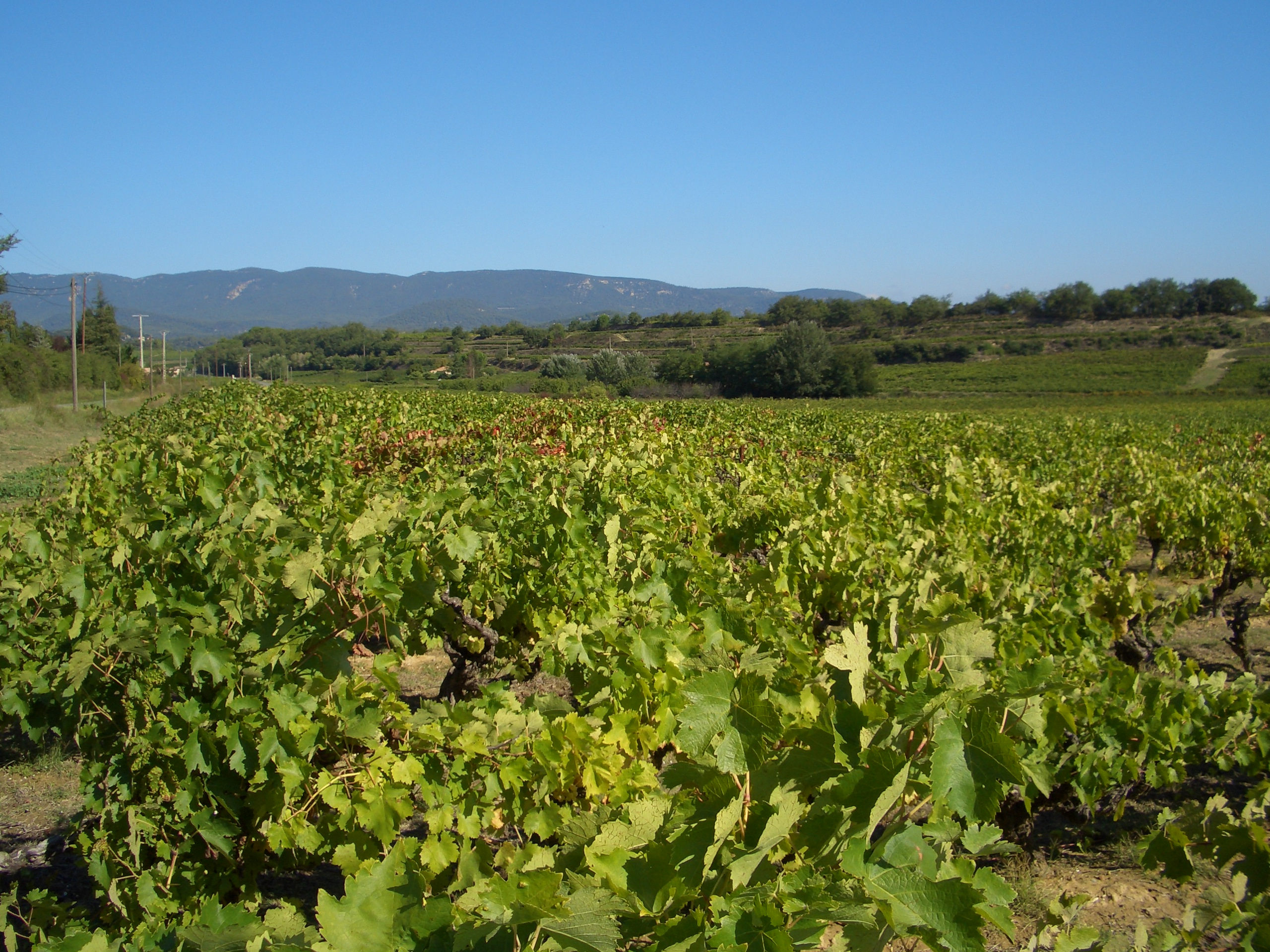
The Vaucluse region where Bouteillan noir was noted to be widely planted in the early 18th century.

Bouteillan noir has been recorded in several documents of the 18th and 19th century as being one of the grape varieties that was being grown the Vaucluse region and at some point the variety made its way south into the greater Provence region. The earliest mention of the grape was in 1715 where an unknown commentator noted that Bouteillan noir was more commonly found than other grape varieties such as Rians, Pertuis, Cadenet and Cucuron. Today, besides Bouteillan noir, only Cadenet blanc is a recognized variety or synonym by the Vitis International Variety Catalogue (VIVC).

== Viticulture ==
Bouteillan noir is a late budding and ripening variety that is highly susceptible to coulure which leads to very variable yields each vintage. Other viticultural hazards that the vine is susceptible to include botrytis bunch rot and powdery mildew.

== Relationship to other grapes ==
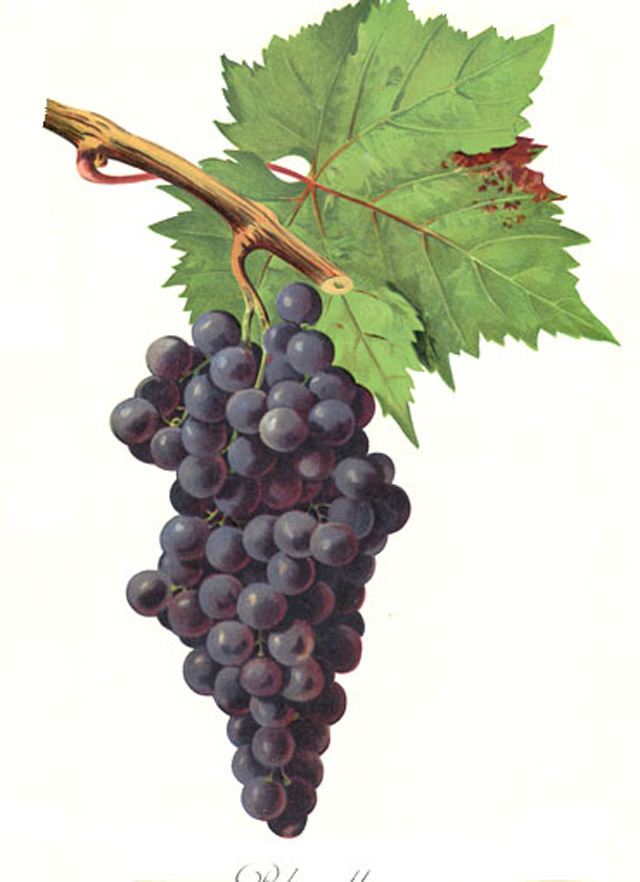
Despite sharing several synonyms, Bouteillan noir has no known relationship to the Provençal wine grape Calitor (pictured).

Ampelographers believe that Bouteillan noir is closely related to Provençal grape Colombaud but unlike Pinot blanc/Pinot noir and Grenache blanc/Grenache, the two grapes are distinct varieties and not color mutations of one or the other. Despite sharing several synonyms with the Languedoc grape Aramon and the Provençal grape Calitor, Bouteillan noir has no known relationship with either variety.

== Styles ==
As the grape is virtually extinct, apart from some plantings in conservation vineyards, there are not many examples of wine made from Bouteillan noir and it is currently not being used in any Appellation d'Origine Contrôlée (AOC) wines. According to French ampelographer Pierre Galet, Bouteillan noir tends to produce very lightly colored and light bodied wines with low alcohol levels.

== Synonyms ==
Over the years Bouteillan noir has been known under a variety of synonyms including: Bouteillan a Gros Grains, Boutelion noir, Cargomuou, Cayau, Esfouiral, Esfouiras de Roquemaure, Fouiral (in the Hérault department), Moulas (in the Vaucluse department), Petit Bouteillan, Plant de Psalmodi, Psalmodi noir, Psalmody, Sigotier and Sigoyer (in the Alpes-de-Haute-Provence department).
