= Calitor =

Variety of grape

- Grape (Vitis)
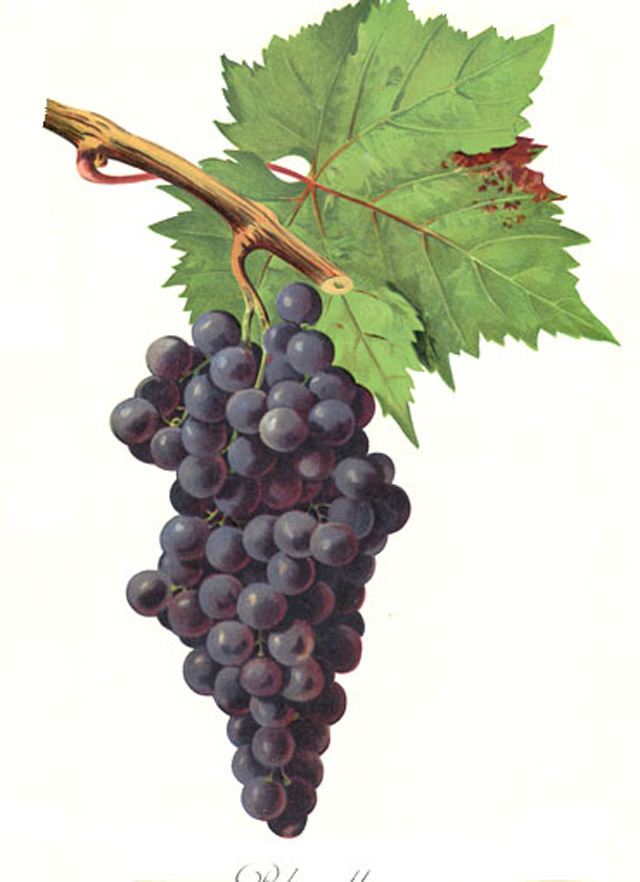
- Calitor (Blavette) in Viala & Vermorel
- Color of berry skin: Noir
- Species: Vitis vinifera
- Also called: Calitor noir and other synonyms
- Origin: France
- VIVC number: 2000

Calitor or Calitor noir is a red French wine grape variety. It was previously widely cultivated in southern France, in particular in Provence, but is now very rare, almost extinct. Historically used as mainly a blending variety, Calitor gives high yields and produces a light-bodied and lightly colored wine. When grown on hillside sites, it can give a wine of character.

Calitor is a very old variety that was first noted growing in southern France in 1600. The grape has produced two color mutations, Calitor blanc, which has been growing in the Costières de Nîmes region since at least 1782, and a pink-berried Calitor gris which are both not widely grown. Plantings of Calitor noir, itself, have been steadily declining since the early 20th century as French wine producers turned first to the more reliably productive Aramon noir and later to higher quality international varieties such as Cabernet Sauvignon and Syrah. In 1968, there were 319 hectares (790 acres) of Calitor noir in France but by 2008 that number had dropped to just 31 hectares (77 acres).

== History ==
Ampelographers believe that the name Calitor is derived from the Provençal words Col (meaning "stalk") and tor (meaning "twisted") and was likely a reference to the near right angle bent of the peduncle stalk of Calitor bunches as they hang on the vine. The earliest synonyms of Calitor, Col Tor and Pécoui-Touar, mean literally "twisted stalks".

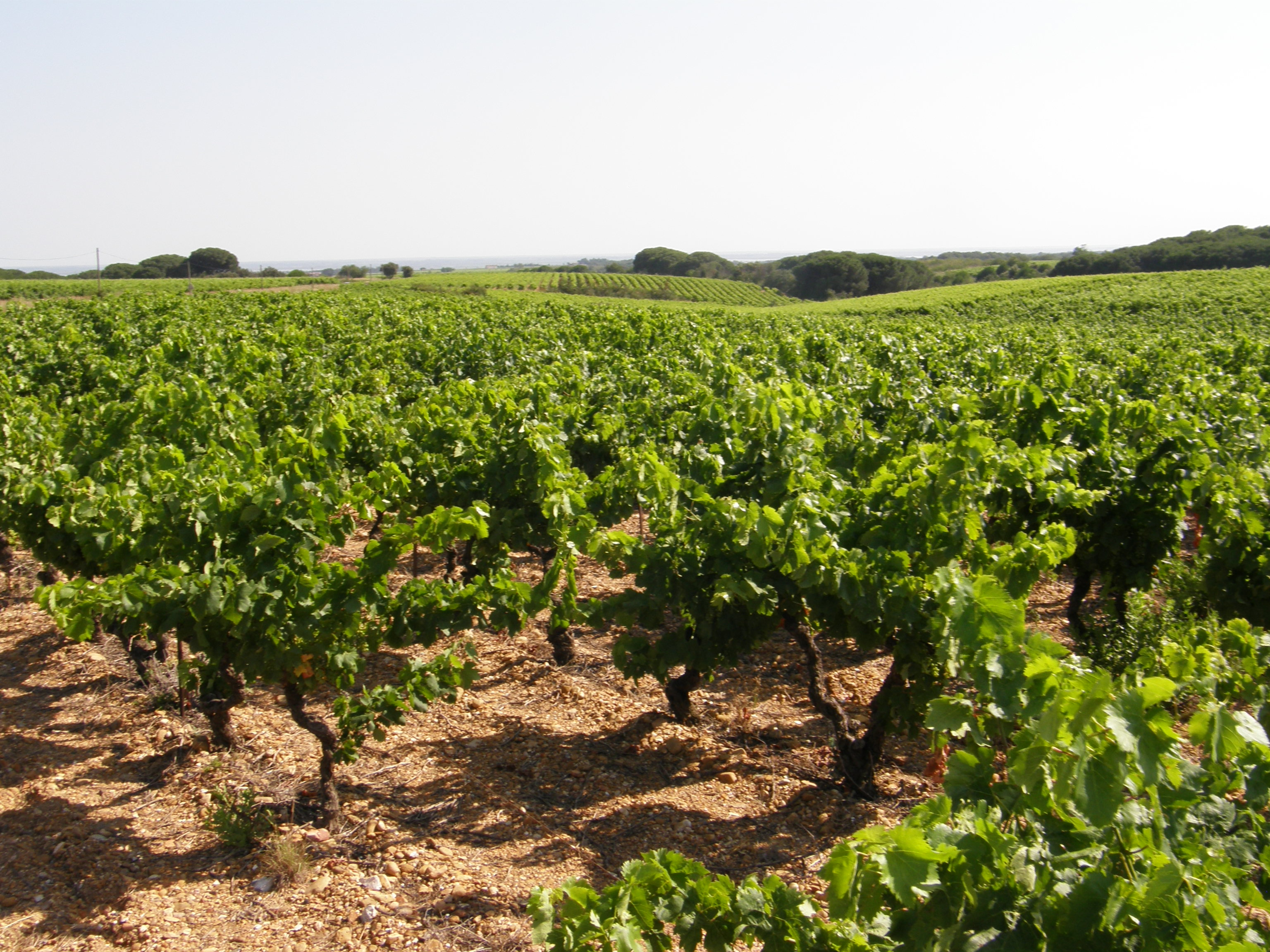
The white-berried mutation of Calitor, Calitor blanc, was first mentioned in 1782 growing in the Nîmes region (pictured).

Under the synonym Colitor, the grape was mentioned along with Pinot, Ribier, Beaunois, Meslier, Bourboulenc and other varieties, in French soil scientist Olivier de Serres' work Théâtre d'Agriculture (1600) as one of the distinguished varieties that was commonly planted in several provinces. In 1656, the grape was mentioned again under the name Colitor growing around the commune of Lapalud in Vaucluse department of the Provence-Alpes-Côte d'Azur region. The white-berried color mutation, Calitor blanc, was first mentioned in 1782 as being one the varieties behind the popular white wines of the Nîmes in the Gard department of the Languedoc-Roussillon region.

After the phylloxera epidemic of the mid-19th century and the World Wars of the early 20th century, plantings of Calitor were slow to recover as French wine growers first turn to plantings of hybrid grape varieties and reliable workhorse varieties like Aramon noir. In 1968 there were 319 hectares (790 acres) of Calitor planted in France but for the rest of the 20th century those plantings slowly declined as growers were now focusing on more popular international varieties like Cabernet Sauvignon and Syrah. In the late 20th and early 21st century, the rules for several Appellation d'origine contrôlée (AOC) regions were rewritten with Calitor's roles in those AOC greatly diminished. For example, in the Côtes de Provence AOC new plantings of Calitor are discouraged by the AOC requirement that only Calitor grapes harvested from vines that were planted before 1994 are permitted to be used in the AOC red and rosé wines. By 2008, plantings of the grape had dropped to 31 hectares (77 acres) throughout France.

== Viticulture ==
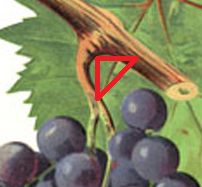
The Calitor grape gets its name from the characteristic "twist" of the peduncle stem holding the grape cluster that makes a near right angle bent with the cane.

Calitor is a late ripening grape variety that can be very productive and high yielding if not kept in check by winter pruning or green harvesting during the growing season. The vine tends to produce large clusters of big berries that hang from the vine with a near right angle bent of the peduncle stem that attaches the bunch to the cane of the grapevine. It is this "twisted stalk" look that gives rise to the grape's name and several of its synonyms.

While Calitor has some resistance to powdery mildew, it is very susceptible to the viticultural hazards of botrytis bunch rot and downy mildew.

=== Confusion with other grapes ===
Despite sharing several synonyms with Bouteillan noir, Calitor has no known relationship with the Provençal wine grape. In Nice, plantings of Calitor noir have historically been confused with Braquet noir. Other varieties that are sometimes confused with Calitor noir include Jurançon and Piquepoul noir.

== Wine regions ==
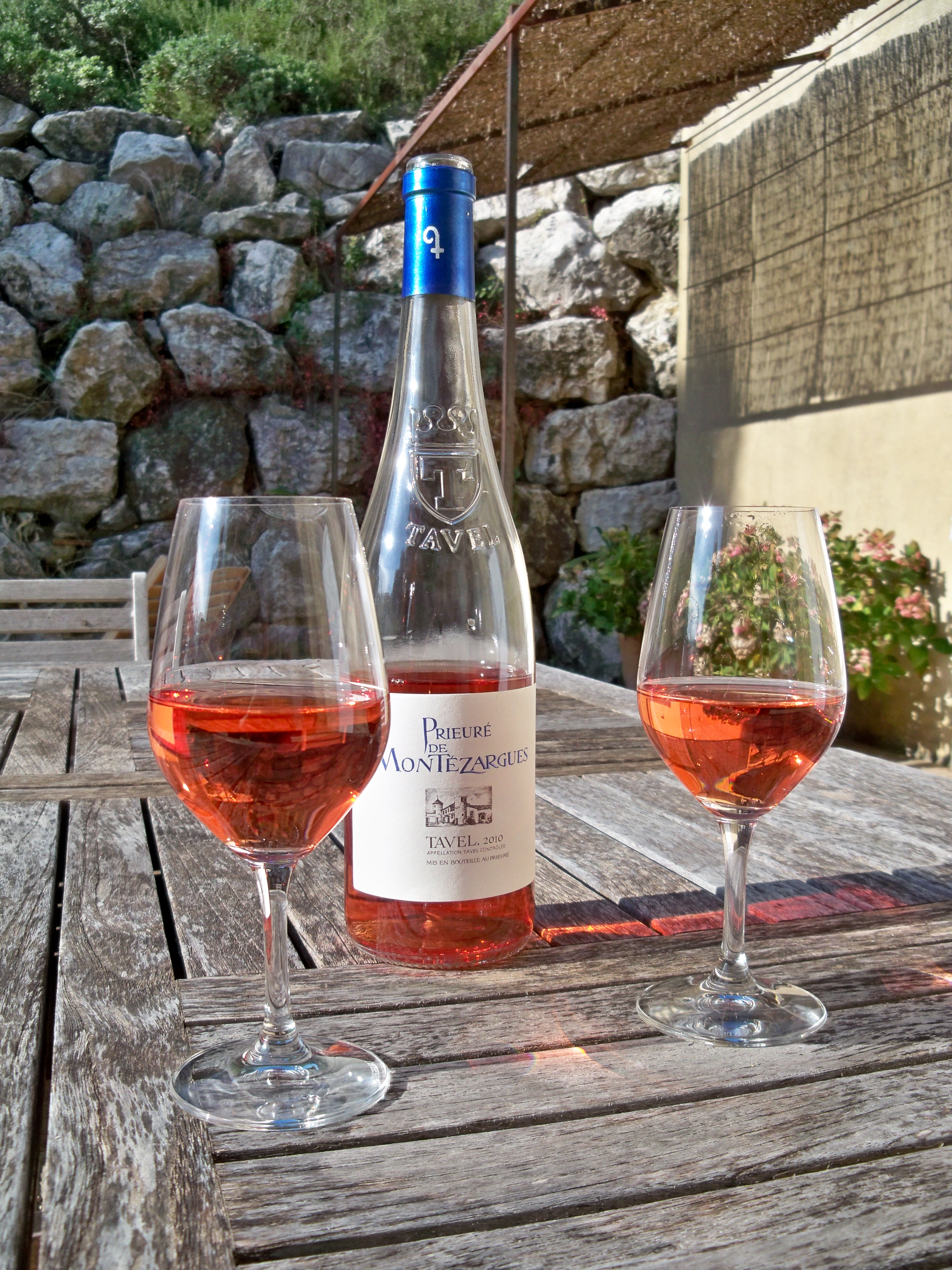
Calitor is limited to accounting for a maximum of 10% of the blend in the rosé wines of Tavel.

While Calitor is a permitted grape variety in several AOCs of the southern Rhône, Languedoc and Provence but its use is very limited. In Bandol, the grape was once permitted to be blended with Mourvèdre, Grenache, Cinsault and other varieties in the AOC red and rosé wines but a revision of the AOC wine laws in 1992 took Calitor off the list of permitted grape varieties for that AOC. The wine laws of the Côtes de Provence AOC were also rewritten to further limit Calitor use with a grandfather clause allowing only Calitor grapes from vines that were planted before 1994 to still be used in the AOC wines.

In the rosé-only AOC of Tavel of the southern Rhone, Calitor is still permitted to be blended Grenache, Cinsault and other varieties but only to a maximum of 10% of the blend.

== Styles ==
According to Master of Wine Jancis Robinson, Calitor tends to produce light-bodied wines that are often very light in color with low acidity that can make the wine come across as "dull".

== Synonyms ==
Over the years Calitor has been known under a variety of synonyms including: Anglas, Assadoule Bouvier, Binxeilla, Blavette, Calitor noir, Canseron, Cargo Miola, Cargo Muou, Catitor, Causeron, Causeroun, Charge Mulet, Colitor, Col Tor, Coulitor, Coytor, Dameron des Vosges, Foirard, Foirat, Fouiraire, Fouiral, Fouirassan, Garriga (in Roussillon), Mouillas, Noeuds-Courts, Nou Courte, Pampoul, Pécoui-Touar (in Bandol), Pecoui Touar, Pecoui Tovar, Picpoule Sorbier, Piquepoul de Fronton, Pride of Australia, Qualitor, Ramonen, Rouget de Salins, Rousselin, Rousselin noir, Rousset, Rouxal, Sang de Boeuf, Saure, Sen Zhan, Siege noir, Sigotier, Sigoyer, and Tentyure Artekskii.

Synonyms for Calitor blanc include: Clairette Egreneuse, Coronega and Pampoul.

Synonyms for Calitor gris include: Fouirau and Saoule Bouvier.
