= Château Galoupet =

wine estate in spring

Château Galoupet is a vineyard in Provence owned by LVMH.

Château Galoupet is one of the 23 cru classé estates in the 1955 Côtes de Provence classification. It was bought in 2019 by Moët-Hennessy for an undisclosed sum. As of 2025, it only sells two wines: the estate-produced Chateau Galoupet Cru Classé rosé, and G de Galoupet, a négociant rosé.

The estate emphasises biodiversity and sustainability in its production.
