= Château Minuty =

Vineyard in Provence, France

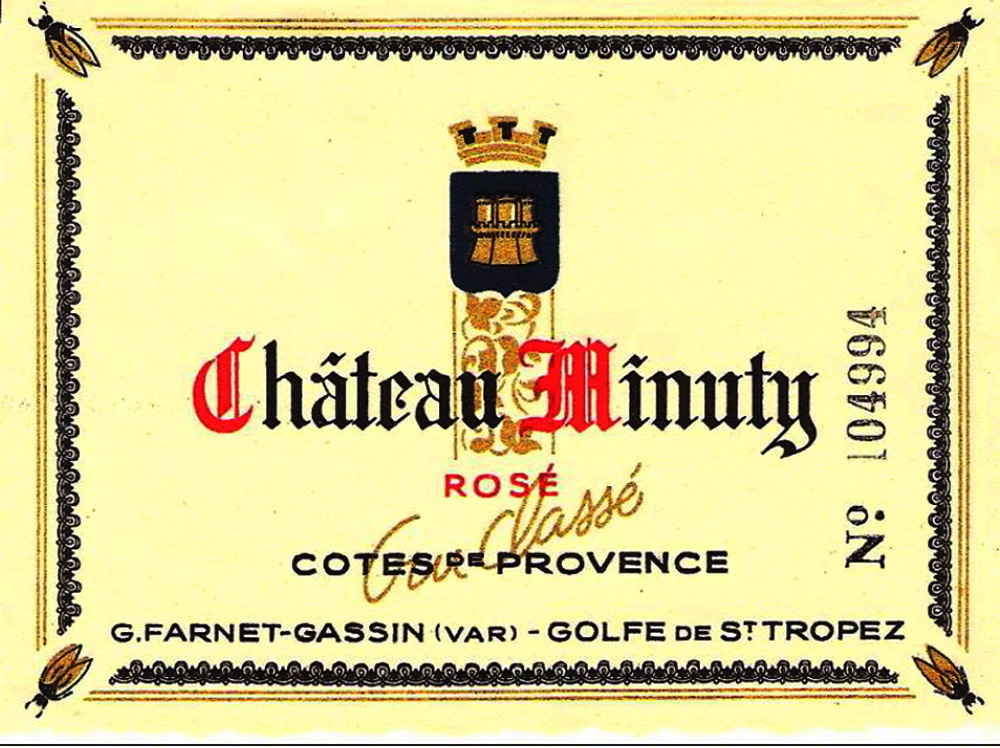
A Château Minuty cru classé bottle label.

Château Minuty is a vineyard in Provence owned by LVMH.

Château Minuty is one of the 23 cru classé estates in the 1955 classification. It was owned by the Farnet family since 1936, which became the Farnet-Matton family in the 1960s. In 2023, Moët-Hennessy acquired a majority stake for €350m to €450m. As of 2023, Minuty produces approximately 8 million bottles of rosé wine per year. Its customer base is mostly in Europe, the Caribbean, and Dubai.
