= Palette AOC =

Wine Appellation d'Origine Contrôlée in the Provence region of southern France

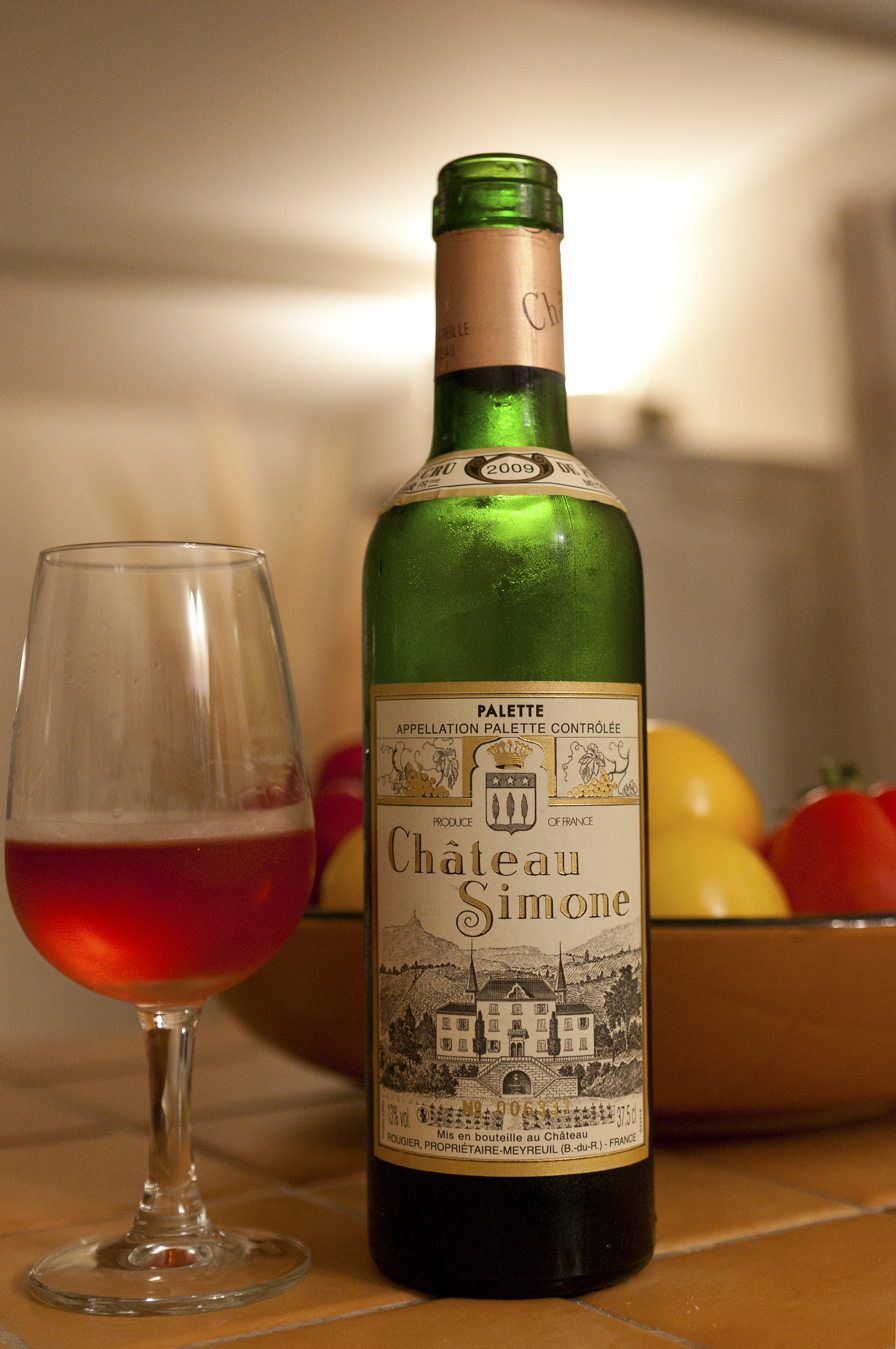
An AOC Palette wine from Château Simone.

Palette (French pronunciation: [palɛt]) is a small French wine AOC in the Provence region of southern France, near Aix-en-Provence. The AOC was established in 1948.

The grapes for this AOC are grown in Aix-en-Provence, Meyreuil, and Le Tholonet. The hamlet of Palette, which gives its name to the AOC, is located on the territory of the commune of Le Tholonet.

== AOC rules ==
Grapes destined for red, white and rosé wines of Palette must be harvested to a yield no greater than 40 hl/ha and the finished wines must all attain a minimum alcohol level of at least 11%. The blend for the reds and rosé must be composed of a minimum 80% Grenache, Mourvedre and/or Cinsault with the remaining 20% permitted to be a blend from Syrah, Carignan Castet, Manosquin, Muscat noir and Cabernet Sauvignon.

The whites of Palette are composed of at least 80% Clairette with Bourboulenc, Trebbiano, Grenache blanc and several white varieties Muscat permitted to round out the remaining 20%.
