= Domaine de Trévallon =

Domaine de Trévallon is a vineyard in Provence owned by the Dürrbach family.
