= Fuella =

Variety of grape

Fuella is a red wine grape that is grown primarily in the Bellet region near Nice. It is considered one of the oldest vines in southeastern France and produces wines that are deep colored and reflective of their terroir. It is often made into rosés.
