= Provence wine =

French wine from Provence

The Provence wine region, located primarily in the Var department, and the appellations of Provence.

Provence wine or Provençal wine (Occitan: vin de Provença, IPA: [ˌvĩn de pʀuˈvɛ̃nsɔ]) comes from the French wine-producing region of Provence in southeast France. The Romans called the area provincia nostra ("our province"), giving the region its name. Just south of the Alps, it was the first Roman province outside Italy.

Wine has been made in this region for at least 2,600 years, ever since the ancient Greeks founded the city of Marseille in 600 BC. Throughout the region's history, viticulture and winemaking have been influenced by the cultures that have been present in Provence, which include the Ancient Greeks, Romans, Gauls, Catalans and Savoyards. These diverse groups introduced a large variety of grapes to the region, including grape varieties of Greek and Roman origin as well as Spanish, Italian and traditional French wine grapes.

Today the region is known predominantly for its rosé wine, though wine critics such as Tom Stevenson believe that region's best wines are the spicy, full-flavoured red wines. Rosé wine currently accounts for more than half of the production of Provençal wine, with red wine accounting for about a third of the region's production. White wine is also produced in small quantities throughout the region with the Appellation d'origine contrôlée (AOC) region of Cassis specializing in white wine production. The Côtes de Provence is the largest AOC followed by the Coteaux d'Aix-en-Provence. The Bandol region near Toulon is one of the more internationally recognized Provençal wine regions.

== History ==
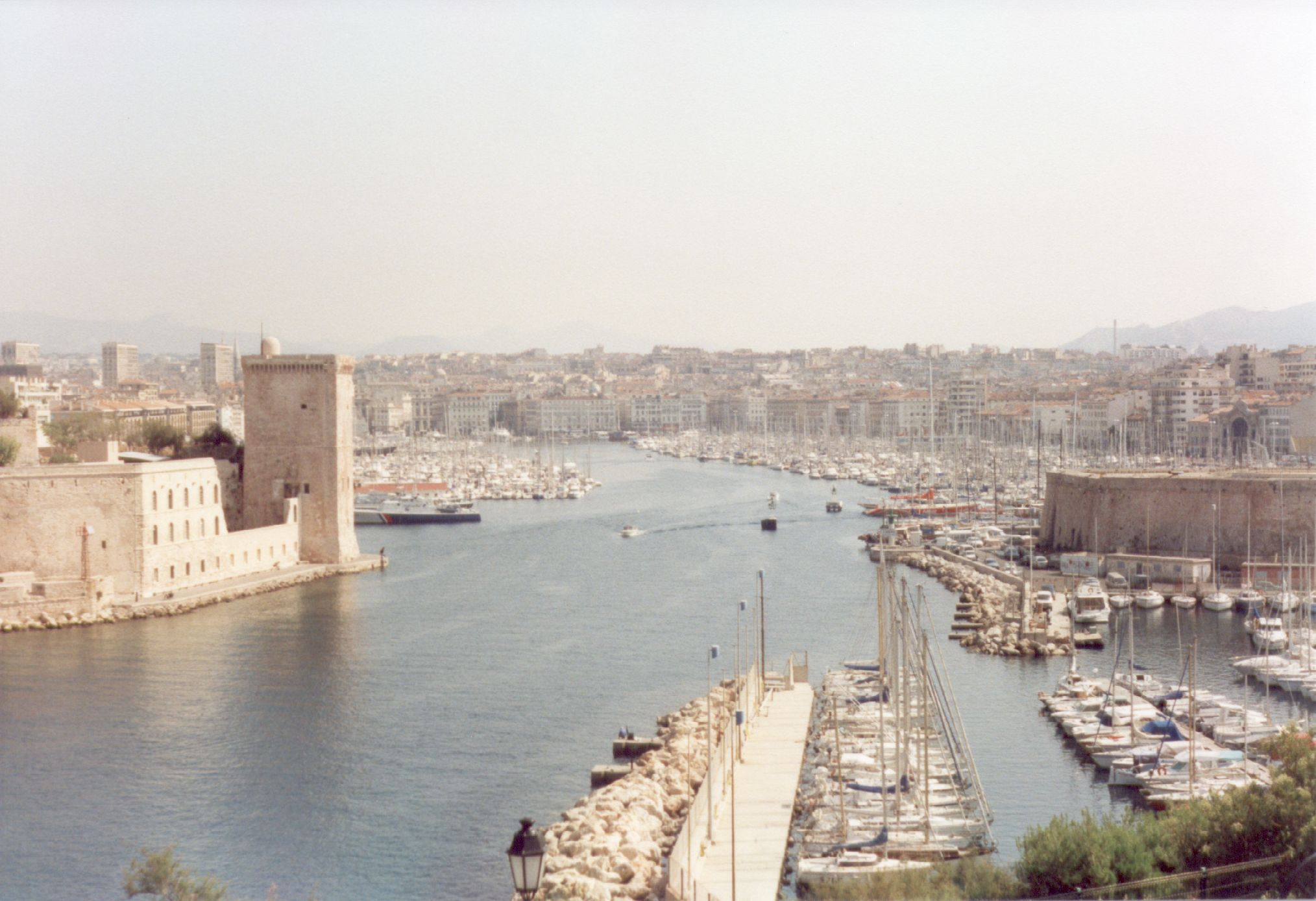
Marseille

Archaeological evidence, in the form of amphora fragments, indicate that the Greeks were producing wine in the region soon after they settled. By the time the Romans reached the area in 125 BC, the wine produced there had a reputation across the Mediterranean for high quality. Over time, the viticulture and winemaking styles of the Provence have been influenced by a wide range of people, rulers, and cultures, including the Carolingians, the Holy Roman Empire, the Counts of Toulouse, the Catalans, René I of Naples, the House of Savoy, and the Kingdom of Sardinia.

At the end of the 19th century, the phylloxera epidemic reached Provence and devastated the region's viticulture. Many vineyards were slow to replant and some turned to the high yielding but lower quality Carignan grape. The arrival of the railroad system in the 19th century opened up new markets such as Paris in the north, and in the 20th century, as tourism developed along the French Riviera, production of rosé increased as a complement to the regional cuisine that features dishes such as bouillabaisse and aioli.

== Climate and geography ==
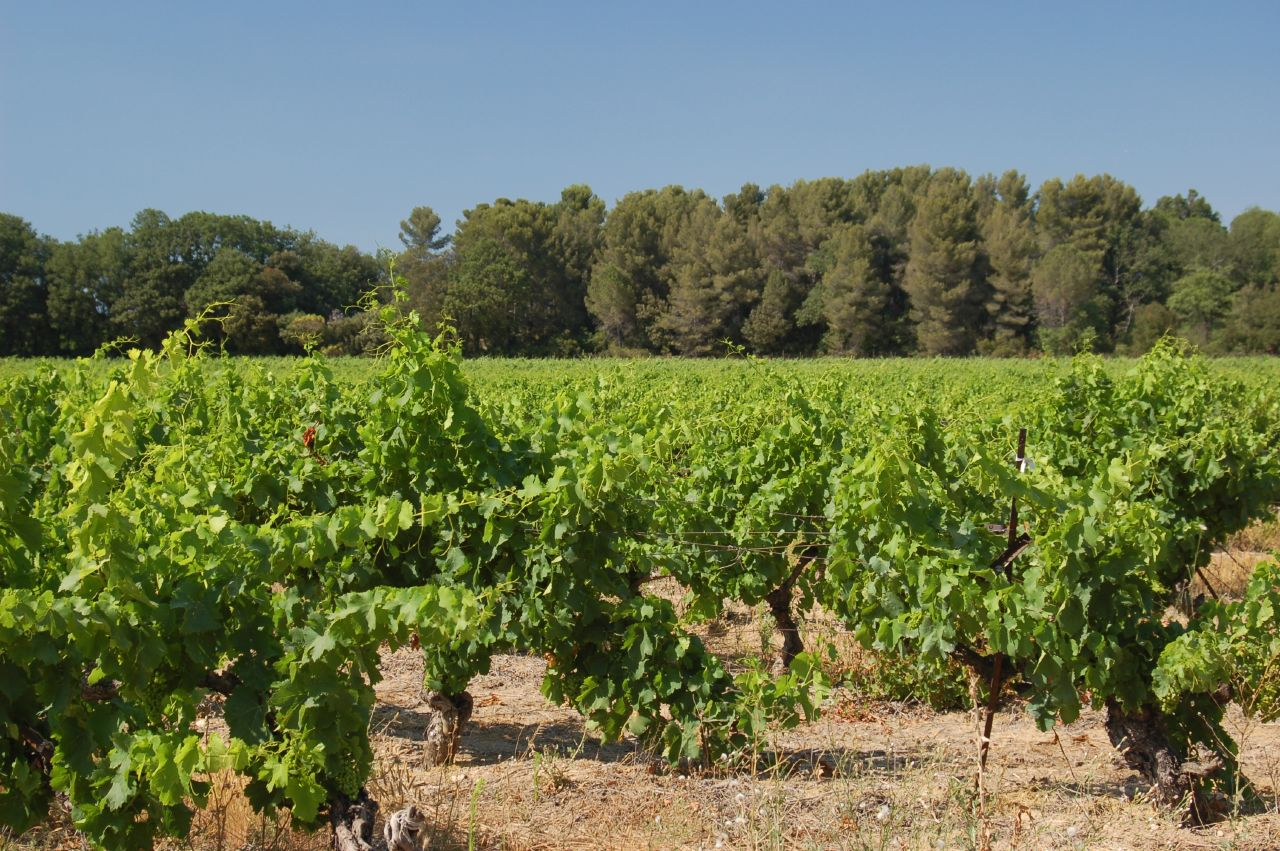
Vineyards in the Coteaux d'Aix-en-Provence region.

Provence has a classic Mediterranean climate, with the sea forming its southern border. Mild winters are followed by very warm summers with little rainfall. Sunshine is found in abundance in this region with the grapevines receiving more than 3,000 hours per year, twice the amount needed to ripen grapes fully. This abundance does have the adverse effect of potentially over ripening grapes if vineyard owners are not cautious. The strong mistral wind from the north provides positive and negative influences on the viticulture. While it can cool the grapes from the heat and dry the grapes after rain, providing some protection against rot and grape diseases, it can also damage vines that are not securely trained and protected by hillside landforms. In areas where the wind is particularly strong, the ideal vineyard locations are on hillsides facing south towards the sea, with the hill providing some shelter from the mistral's strength. In those areas, the type of grape varieties planted will also play a role since south-facing slopes receive the most sunshine and in the warm climate can easily over expose delicate and early ripening varieties which would be better suited on north-facing slopes.

The soil across Provence is varied, lacking uniformity and generalization. In isolated areas, such as the Cassis AOC and near the Mediterranean coastline, are deposits of limestone and shale. These area tend to be planted with white wine grapes that perform better in those soil types.

Some coastal areas in the region have soils with more schist and quartz in their composition while inland there is more clay and sandstone.

== Wine regions ==
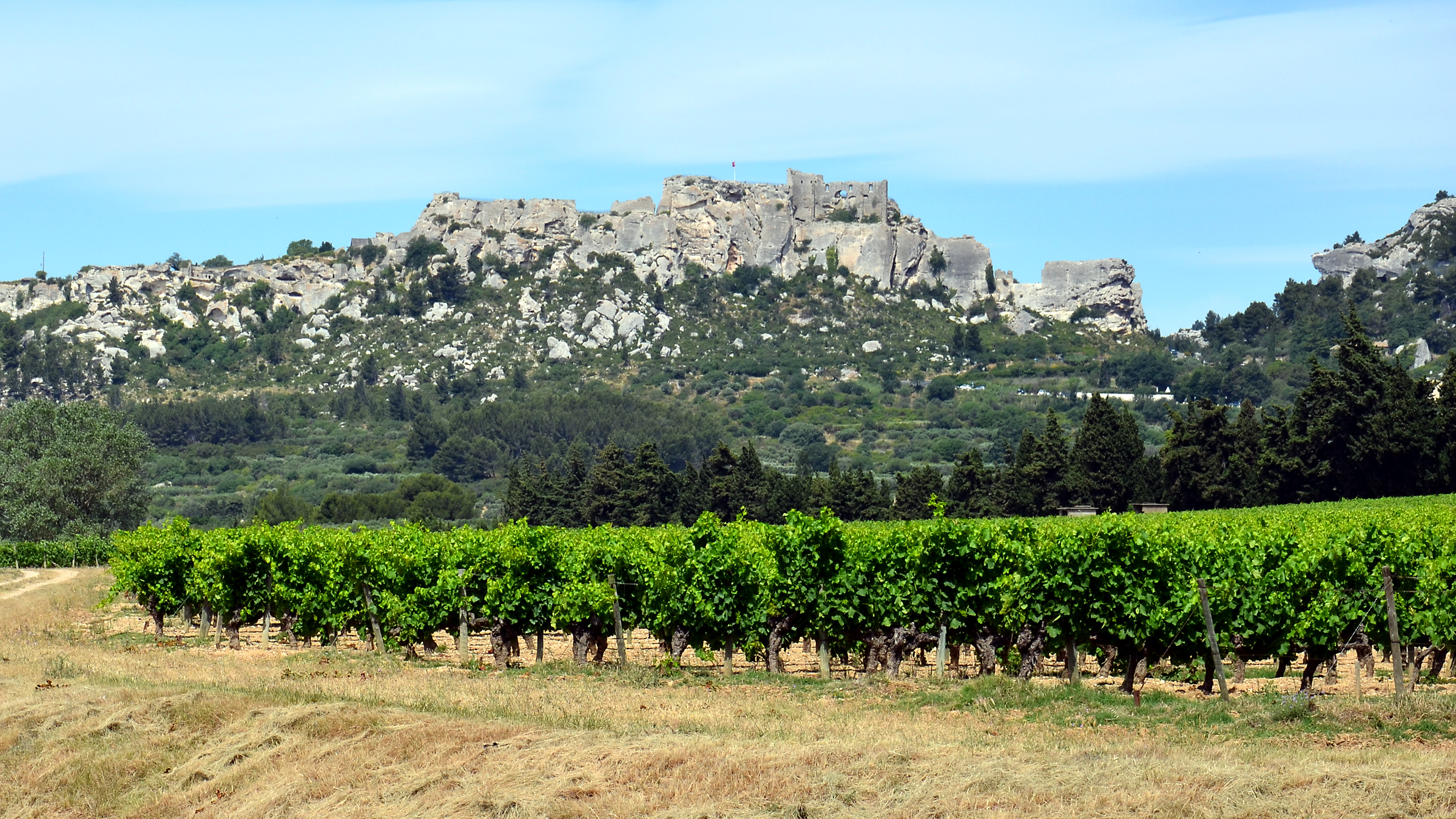
Les Baux-de-Provence with vineyards

Provence has nine wine appellations with AOC status. The Côtes de Provence is the largest followed by Coteaux d'Aix-en-Provence and Coteaux Varois en Provence. The other 6 AOC are Les Baux-de-Provence, Pierrevert, Bandol, Cassis, Bellet and Palette. The Côtes de Provence AOC includes 5 geographic designations that can place their names on the label: Fréjus and Sainte-Victoire since 2005, La Londe since 2008, Pierrefeu since 2013, and Notre-Dame-des-Anges since 2019. Since 2025, Sainte-Victoire is allowed to use the term "Cru" as well as the more technical Dénomination Géographique Complémentaire.

The Côtes du Luberon AOC in the nearby Vaucluse département is occasionally cited by some sources with Provence due to some similarities in wine style; the appellation is however officially part of the Rhône wine region and its typicity more closely approaches that of its neighbour on its northern border, Côtes du Ventoux AOC, also a Rhône wine. The region has several vin de pays designations, with Bouches-du-Rhône, near Aix-en-Provence, being one of the most common designations seen abroad.

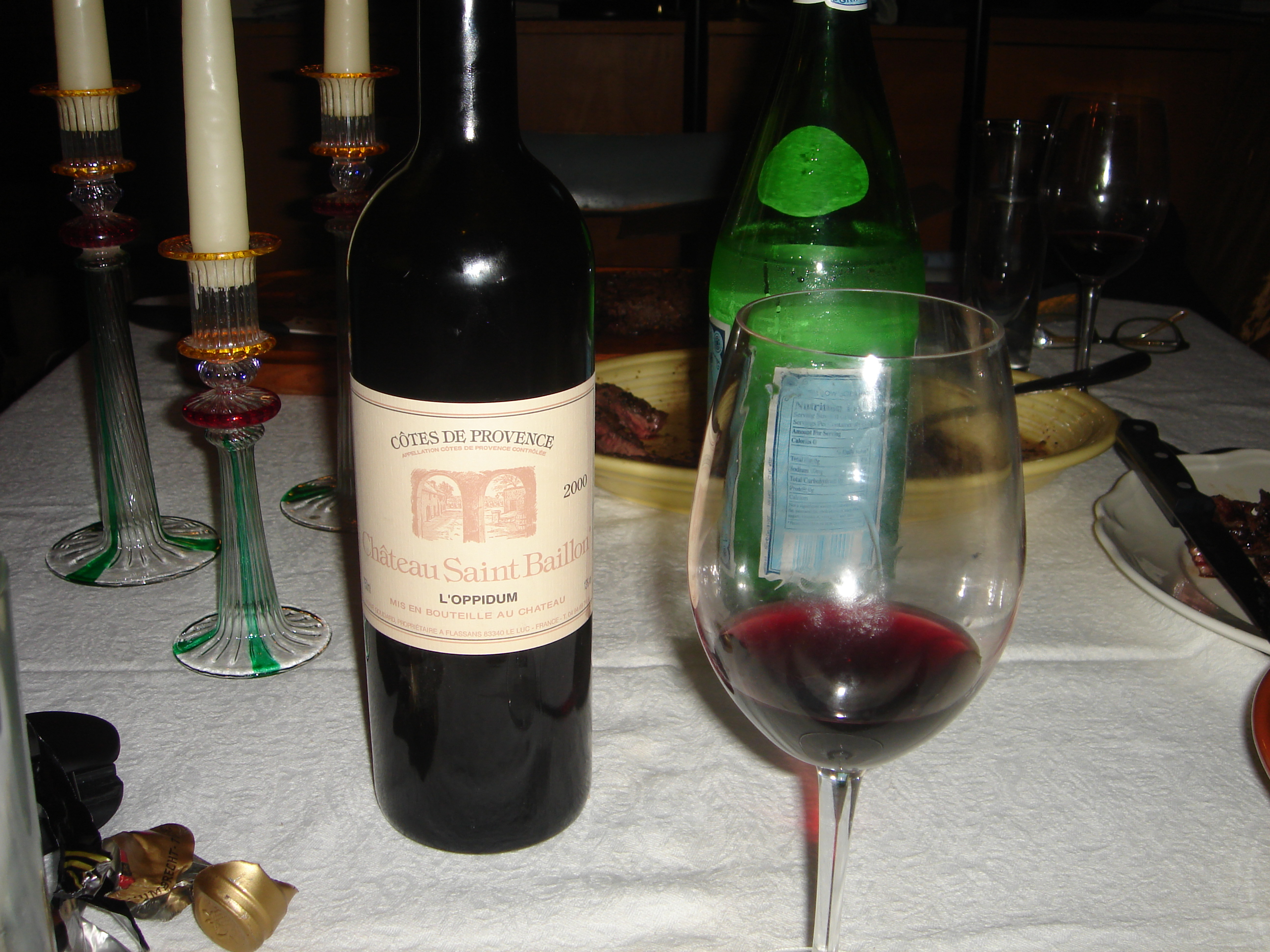
Red wine from the Côtes de Provence.

The Bellet AOC is in southeastern Provence, near Nice has a significant Italian influence with its major white wine being made from the Italian wine grape Vermentino, known in France as Rolle. Other grape varieties include Chardonnay, Clairette, Mayorquin, Muscat Blanc à Petits Grains, Pignerol, Braquet and Roussanne. Though the white wines receive more international attention, production in Bellet is about equal in white, red and rosé wine with most being consumed by tourists to the French Riviera.

The Palette AOC is the smallest major wine area in Provence with most of the vineyards being owned by Château Simone. The region is situated on predominantly calcareous limestone soil and produces wines that are similar in style to the southern Rhône region. The main grapes of the region include Cinsaut, Grenache, Mourvèdre and Ugni blanc.

The Pierrevert AOP (formerly Coteaux de Pierrevert AOC) is a minor wine area located around the village of Pierrevert. It is situated next to the Plateau de Valensole, in the northeastern section of Provence, along the Durance valley, near Manosque. It includes 450ha of vineyards, alongside 350ha of the local Alpes-de-Haute-Provence IGP, spread between 7 producers. Its red, white and rosé wines are mainly made from Grenache, Syrah, Cinsaut, Clairette and Rolle. The climate here is cooler than in other areas of Provence and the wines are thus lighter in body than those of other areas of the region.

As well as these AOP/AOCs, the region includes a large number of IGPs for estates, wines and parcels that do not qualify for the AOP/AOCs.: Alpilles IGP (around Les Baux and the Alpilles), Mont Caume IGP (around Bandol), Maures IGP (around the Maures), etc.

=== Côtes de Provence AOC ===
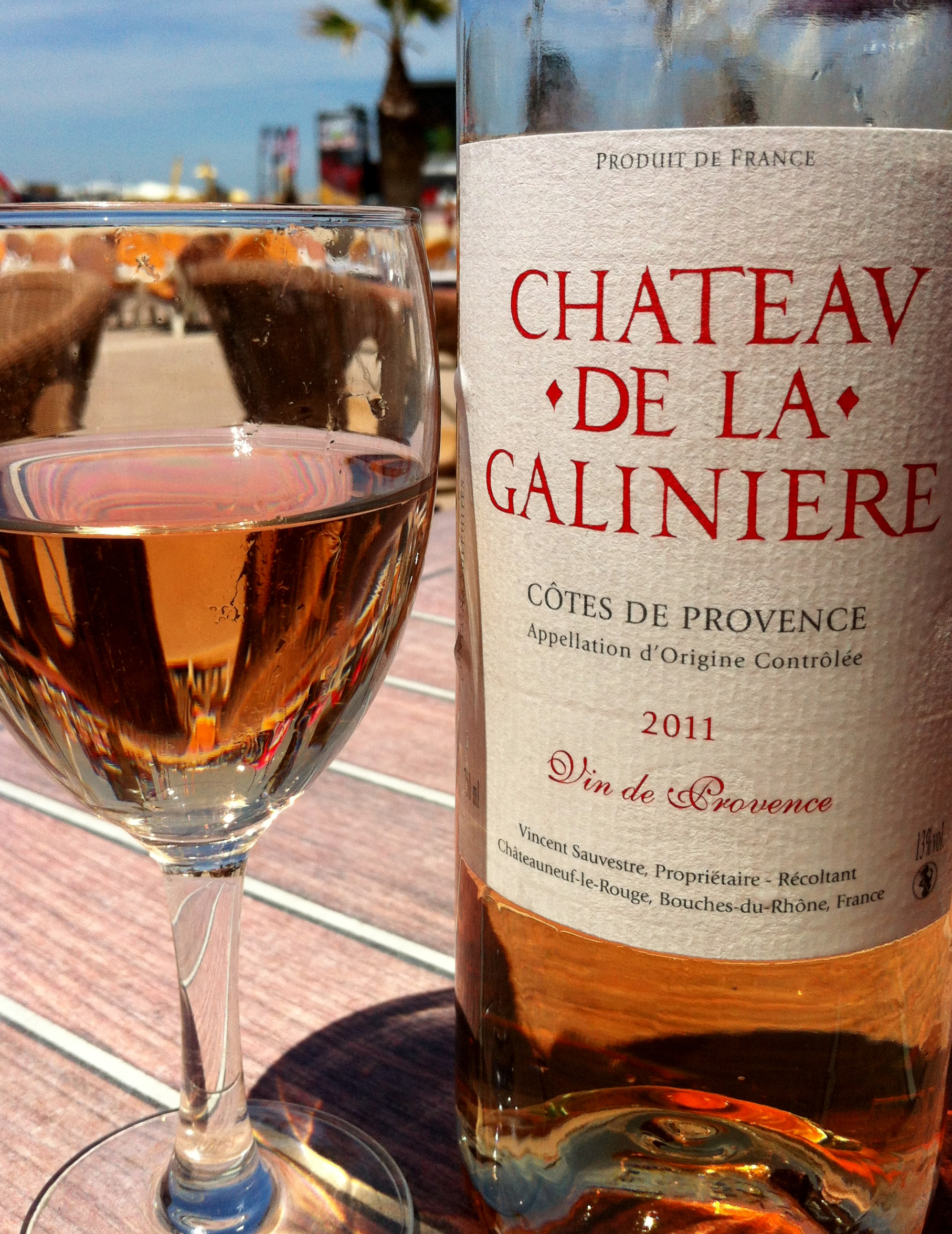
A rosé from the Côtes de Provence AOC.

The Côtes de Provence AOC is a large non-contiguous wine region that covers over 85 communes in the eastern region of Provence. The boundaries of the region extend from the alpine hills near Draguignan to the coast of Saint-Tropez. The noncontiguous parts of the region include land southeast of the Palette AOC and on the outskirts of the Bandol and Cassis wine area. The mountainous terrain near Villars-sur-Var in the northeast part of the area includes vineyards that can label their wine as Côtes de Provence. The region accounts for nearly 75% of all the wine production in Provence with rosé accounting for around 80% of the production. While the number is rising, about 15% of wine production is red wine with the remaining 5% white. The main grape varieties are Carignan, Cinsaut, Grenache, Mourvèdre and Tibouren with an increase in the use of Cabernet Sauvignon and Syrah. To improve quality, producers limit the amount of Carignan used in their rosé and red wine production, using the maximum of 40% permitted in the wine and mandating that at least 60% of the blend be composed of Grenache, Cinsaut, Mourvèdre and Tibouren. There is also an AOC requirement that at least 20% of the rosé must be blended from wine produced by the saignee method of maceration.

There has been more experimentation in the methods used by a new generation of winemakers beginning to incorporate non-traditional methods of rosé production including the use of oak barrels for aging and fermentation. More winemakers are tending to use temperature controlled tanks that allow a cooler fermentation process that is better suited to white wine production. There are still remnants of traditional winemaking in the Côtes de Provence and some producers still use the traditional regional wine bottle which has a distinctive form that is between an amphora vessel and a bowling pin.

=== Coteaux d'Aix-en-Provence and Les Baux-de-Provence ===
The Coteaux d'Aix-en-Provence AOC is the second largest Provençal wine appellation, covering over 50 communes in the west and northwestern regions of Provence. The area comprises the city of Aix-en-Provence and surrounding communes. Nearly 60% of the production is red wine, followed by 35% rosé and 5% white wine. The major grape varieties include Grenache, Cinsaut and Mourvèdre, and Cabernet Sauvignon was introduced to the region in the 1960s. The cuttings came from the Bordeaux estate of Château La Lagune. The main white wine grapes of the Coteaux d'Aix-en-Provence include Bourboulenc, Clairette, Grenache blanc, Chardonnay, Sauvignon blanc and Semillon. Some producers produce white nouveau wine (young wine) that is released in December following the harvest and only two weeks after the release of Beaujolais nouveau. Unlike the red Beaujolais wine, these Provençal white wines are not required to have the words nouveau or primeur on the label.

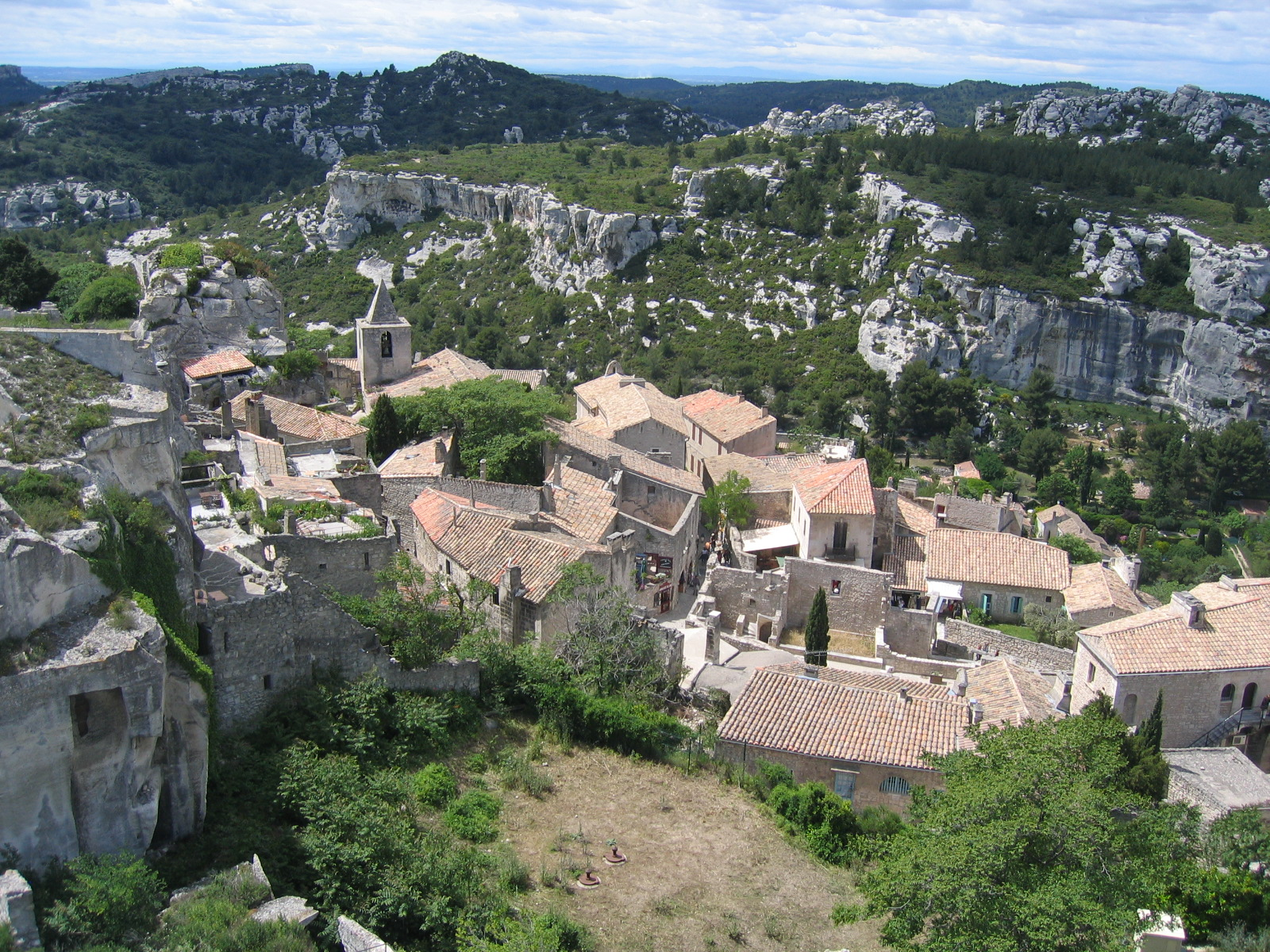
The commune of Les Baux-de-Provence

Within the Coteaux d'Aix-en-Provence is the smaller Les Baux-de-Provence AOC which was granted AOC status in 1995. The climate of the region is very hot with the surrounding valley known as the Val d'Enfer (Valley of Hell). Vineyards are centered around the hilltop village of the Les Baux-de-Provence and red grape varieties account for around 80%. with some white wine and a dry rosé. The leading grape varieties are Grenache, Mourvèdre and Syrah. The AOC rule requires that no two varieties can compose more than 90% of the blend with Carignan, Cinsaut and Counoise permitted but at a maximize usage of 30%. The use of Cabernet Sauvignon is growing in prevalence but is limited to composing no more than 20% of the blend. The rosés of Les Baux-de-Provence are composed of a minimum 60% of Cinsaut, Grenache and Syrah with similar requirements to the AOC red wine that no two grapes varieties compose more than 90% of the blend. Baux-de-Provence requires vineyards to be farmed without the use of herbicides. As of 2023, the entirety of the AOC is farmed organically.

The most famous estate of the Les Baux-de-Provence area (and, arguably, of Provence) is Domaine de Trévallon, owned by the Dürrbach family. They are most notable for being among the estates that pioneered Provence's now-signature Cabernet Sauvignon & Syrah blend for red wines.

=== Bandol ===
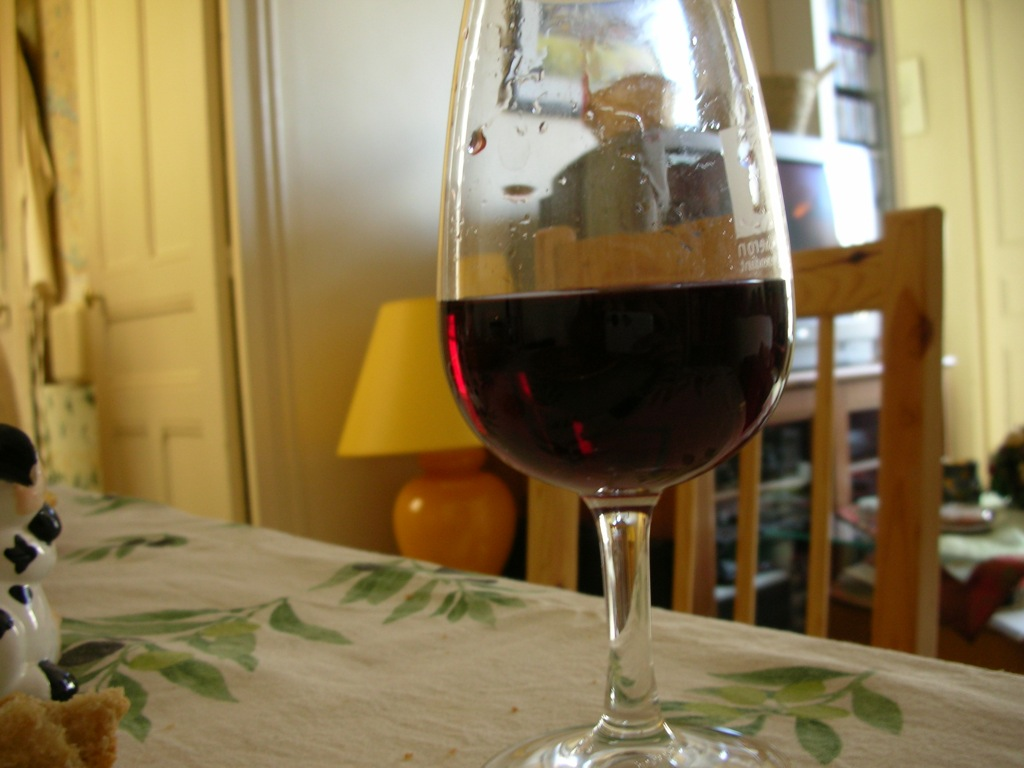
A red Bandol wine.

Bandol AOC, located near the coast east of Marseille and Cassis, is one of the most internationally recognized wines of the Provence regions. Based around the fishing village of Bandol, west of Toulon, the AOC is produced by 8 communes with silicon & limestone soils. Those soils and the warm, coastal climate are ideally suited for the late ripening Mourvèdre grape, which is the major variety. For both the red and rosé wines, Mourvèdre must account for at least 50% of the blend, though most producers will use significantly more, with Grenache and Cinsaut usually completing the composition. Syrah and Carignan are restricted in Bandol to a maximum of 15% of the blend or 10% individually. Nearly 70% of the production is red wine with rosé and a small amount of white wine making up the remainder. Red Bandol wine is characterized by its dark color with rich flavors of black fruit, vanilla, cinnamon and leather and usually requires at least 10 years of aging before it fully develops, although some is produced to be drinkable in three years. Prior to release, the wine is required to age at least 18 months in oak. The white wines of Bandol are composed primarily of Clairette blanche, Bourboulenc and Ugni blanc. Previously Sauvignon blanc was used and is not prohibited by the AOC rules. The rosés of Bandol are characterized by spicy and earthy flavors that can resemble the Rhône rosés from Tavel AOC, with some having strawberry notes.

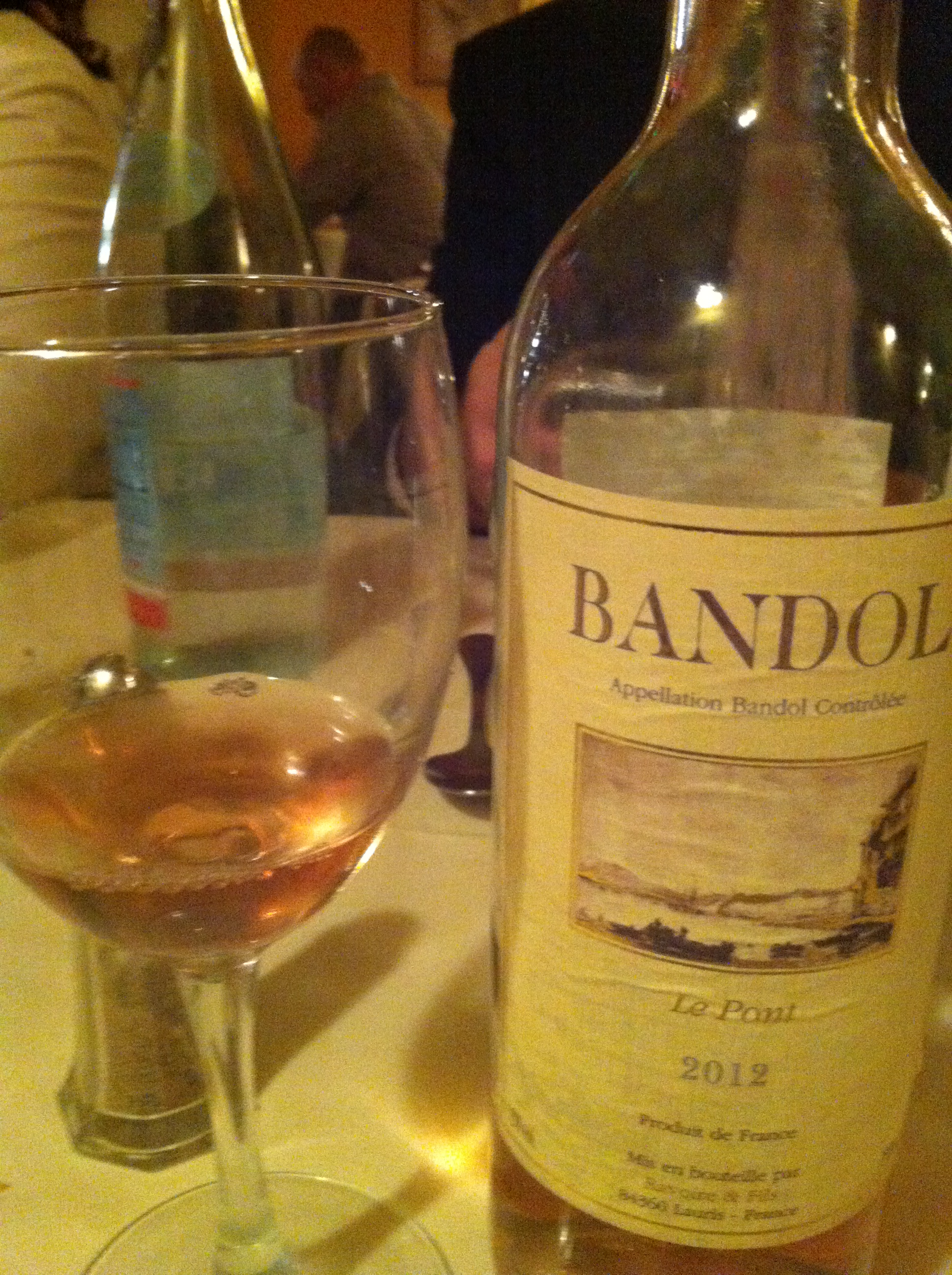
A Bandol rosé.

Bandol is the only French wine that is dominated by the Mourvèdre grape, which expresses differently depending on the particular terroir of the region. The soils in the northwest region, from the communes of Évenos to Saint-Cyr-sur-Mer, are composed of small pebbles and produce lighter, more delicate wines. On the red clay that is scattered throughout the region, the wine produced is very tannic and must be tempered with increased blending of Cinsaut and Grenache. The Grenache grape itself is typically planted on cooler north facing slopes to prevent the grape from over ripening and making the wine highly alcoholic. The relative infertility of the soil throughout the region helps to keep yields low with the Bandol region having some of the lowest yields in France. The use of mechanical harvesting is impractical due to the style of terracing used on the hillsides and is prohibited by the rules of the AOC.

=== Cassis ===
The Cassis AOC, located along the coast between Marseilles and Bandol, is unique in the Provençal wine region, due to white wine comprising over 75% of its production. The soil of the Cassis AOC is primarily limestone, which is particularly suited to the cultivation of Clairette, Marsanne, Ugni blanc and Sauvignon blanc, the major varieties of the area. The dry white wines are characterized by their full bodies, low acidity and herbal aromas that pair well with the local seafood cuisine such as bouillabaisse. Local consumption has outpaced supply and has limited the amount of Cassis wine that can be exported. Local laws are being developed in the region to protect vineyards from being overrun with commercial and residential development from the city of Marseilles.

=== Coteaux Varois en Provence ===
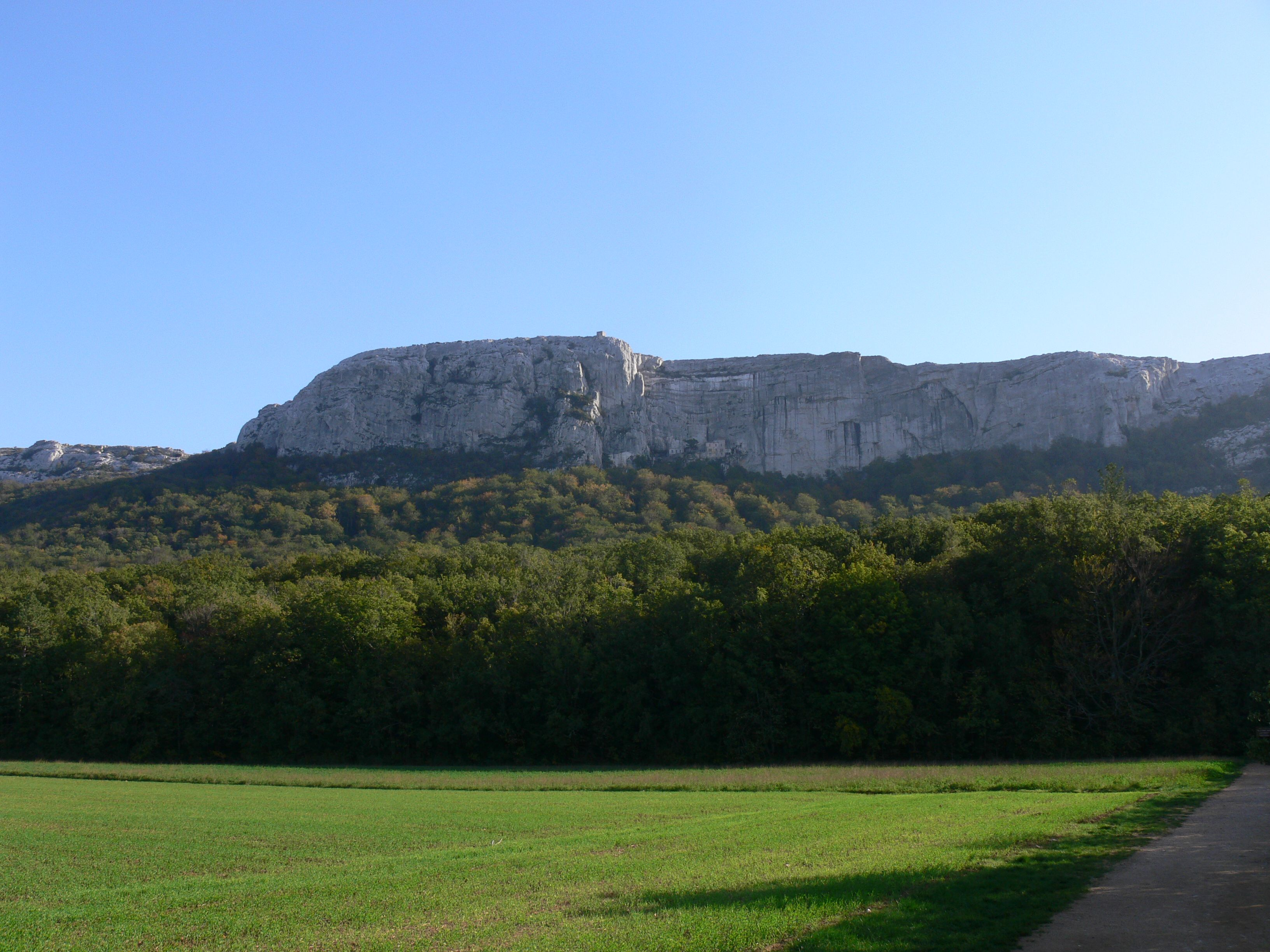
The Massif de la Sainte-Baume.

The Coteaux Varois en Provence AOC covers the central region of Provence, in the Var département from where the region's name is derived, between the Côtes de Provence AOC and the Coteaux d'Aix-en-Provence AOC. The region is sheltered by the surrounding Sainte-Baume mountains which have a tempering effect on the Mediterranean influences that are common throughout Provence. This is most evident in the vineyards around Brignoles where the cooler climate causes harvesting to be carried out in November, several weeks after most Provençal wine areas have harvested in early September. This unique terroir has encouraged interest from Burgundy wine producers such as Maison Louis Latour to experiment with planting Pinot noir. The region started out as a vin de pays and was upgraded to Vin Délimité de Qualité Supérieure (VDQS) status in 1985, followed by AOC status in 1993. Over 60% of the region's production is rosé with around 33% red wine and small amount of white wine. The main grape varieties of the region are Grenache, Cabernet Sauvignon, Cinsaut, Mourvèdre, Syrah and Carignan.

== Classified estates ==
Provence is the only French wine region outside of Bordeaux that has developed a classified ranking for wine estates. (Burgundy, Champagne and Alsace classify their vineyard areas, not wine estates).

On July 20, 1955, 22 years before Cotes de Provence wines got their Appellation d'Origine Contrôlée, 23 Provençal wine estates managed to officially designate themselves Crus Classés based on an evaluation of the estates' history, winemaking and cellar reputation and overall vineyard quality; however 5 estates no longer make wine so only 18 estates are classified today:

- Clos Cibonne in Le Pradet
- Clos Mireille in La Londe-les-Maures
- Domaine du Jas d'Esclans in La Motte
- Domaine de Rimauresq in Pignans
- Domaine de la Croix in La Croix-Valmer
- Domaine du Noyer
- Château de L'Aumérade
- Château de Brégançon in Bormes-les-Mimosas
- Château du Galoupet in La Londe-les-Maures
- Château de Mauvanne in Hyères
- Château Minuty in Gassin
- Château de Roubine in Lorgues
- Château Ste. Marguerite in La Londe-les-Maures
- Château de St. Martin
- Château St. Maur in Cogolin
- Château Ste. Roseline in Les Arcs
- Château de Selle in Taradeau
- Château de la Clapière

This classification has never been revisited or modified. Estates cannot include grapes from new vineyard land in Cru Classé wine. A "Club des Crus Classés de Cotes de Provence" was created in 2000 and in 2005 they signed a charter of excellence; 14 of the 18 classified estates are currently members.

Some producers make a (lesser) second or third wine that they also mark cru classé de Provence. In addition, the list cannot be changed, no new wineries can be added and a winery cannot lose the cru classé status. The 18 lucky owners just benefit from the classification, no matter how good the wine is.

== Grape varieties ==
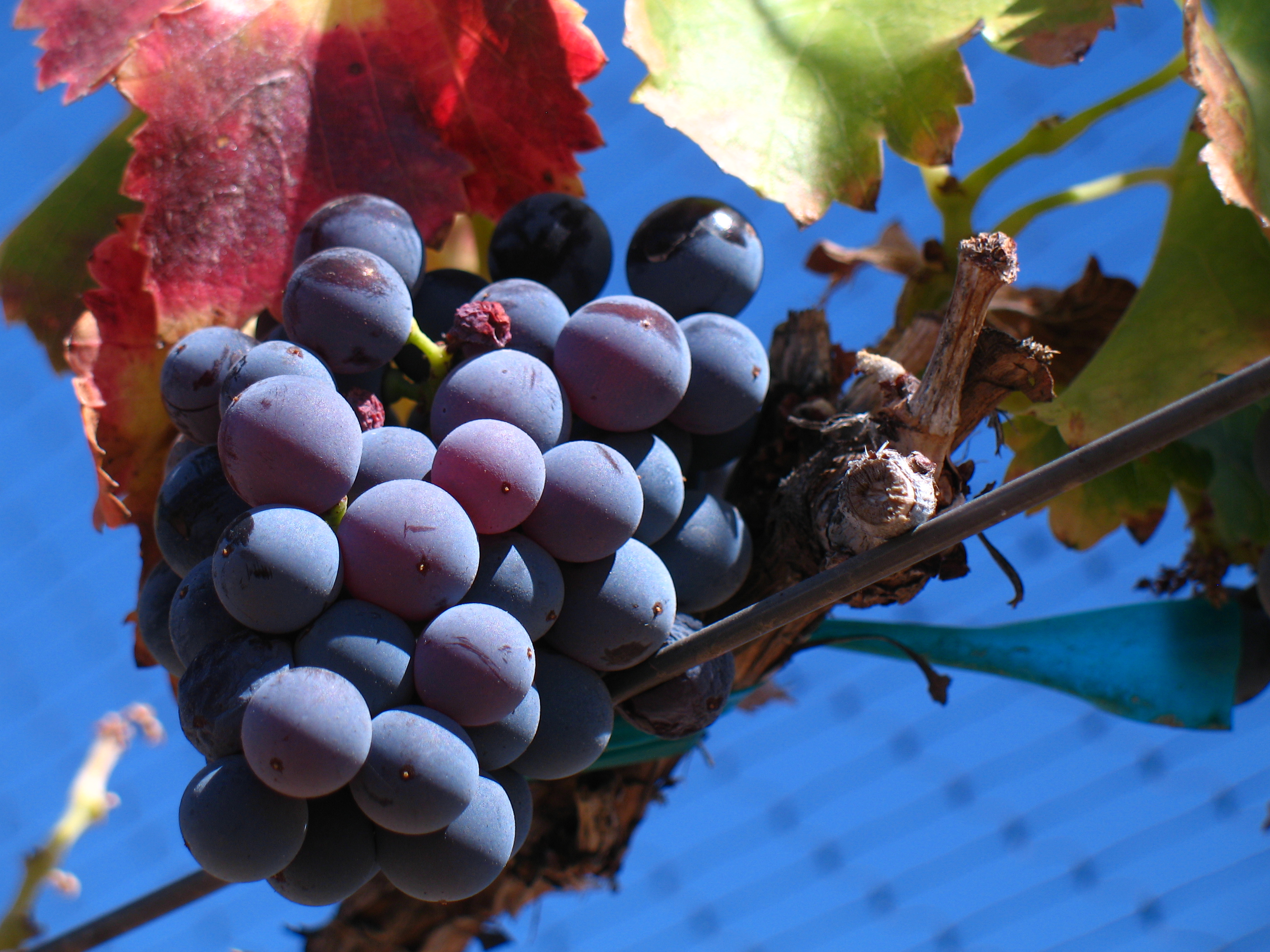
Grenache.

The main grape variety throughout Provence is Mourvèdre, which is the primary component in many red wines and rosés. Provence makes over 1,000 kinds of wines. It is often blended with Grenache and Cinsault, with the latter being used as a significant component in most rosé. Cabernet Sauvignon and Syrah are rising in prominence, though some traditional Provençal winemakers view those grapes with suspicion and a sign of globalization and appeal to international tastes. For the last century, Carignan has been a major grape but as more producer aim for improved quality the use of this high yielding grape has decreased. Other significant grape varieties, used primarily in blending, include Braquet, Calitor, Folle and Tibouren. The major white wine grapes of Provence include the Rhône varieties of Bourboulenc, Clairette, Grenache blanc, Marsanne and Viognier as well as Chardonnay, Sauvignon blanc, Semillon, Rolle and Ugni blanc.

Over its history, many grape varieties have grown in Provence that are now nearly extinct including Pascal blanc.

Provence is a central hub for rosé production. Between 2010 and 2024, exports of rosé from this region have increased by approximately 500%.

== Wine styles and food pairings ==
Wine expert Karen MacNeil notes that most well made examples of Provençal wine have flavors and aromas that reflect the garrigue landscape of the region which includes wild lavender, rosemary and thyme. The rosés of the region are normally dry with zestiness derived from their acidity. The red and whites are characterized by their full bodies and intense aromatics. The nature and impression of the wines change significantly depending on whether they are consumed as an apéritif or paired with food, particularly the traditional flavors of Provençal cuisine. The rosé wine in particular is noted for its ability to pair well with garlic based dishes, such as aioli.

== See also ==
- Cuisine of Provence and the Côte d'Azur
- List of Vins de Primeur
