= Aromatic wine =

Aromatic wines are white wines with dominant aroma. The best known are riesling, gewürztraminer, viognier, muscat and pinot gris.

== Grape Aromas ==
One source of an aromatic wine's smell is from its grapes. Large portions of research on grape aroma is based around Muscat grapes. A grape's primary aroma stems from monoterpenes. These are most densely found within the skin of the grape. When grapes ripen they develop monoterpenes, and start to lose this compound as they age, losing aroma over time.

Some of the terpene compounds found in Muscat grapes include Linalool, which smells of hyacinth, and geraniol, which smells of citrus and roses. Other grapes can have different compounds than the Muscat, creating different aromas. The concord grape for example includes o-Aminoacetophenone, which smells like caramel, and methyl anthranilate, which smells similar to orange. These are but a few studied examples.

== See also ==
- Aroma of wine
