= Ramdane Touhami =

French fashion designer (born 1974)

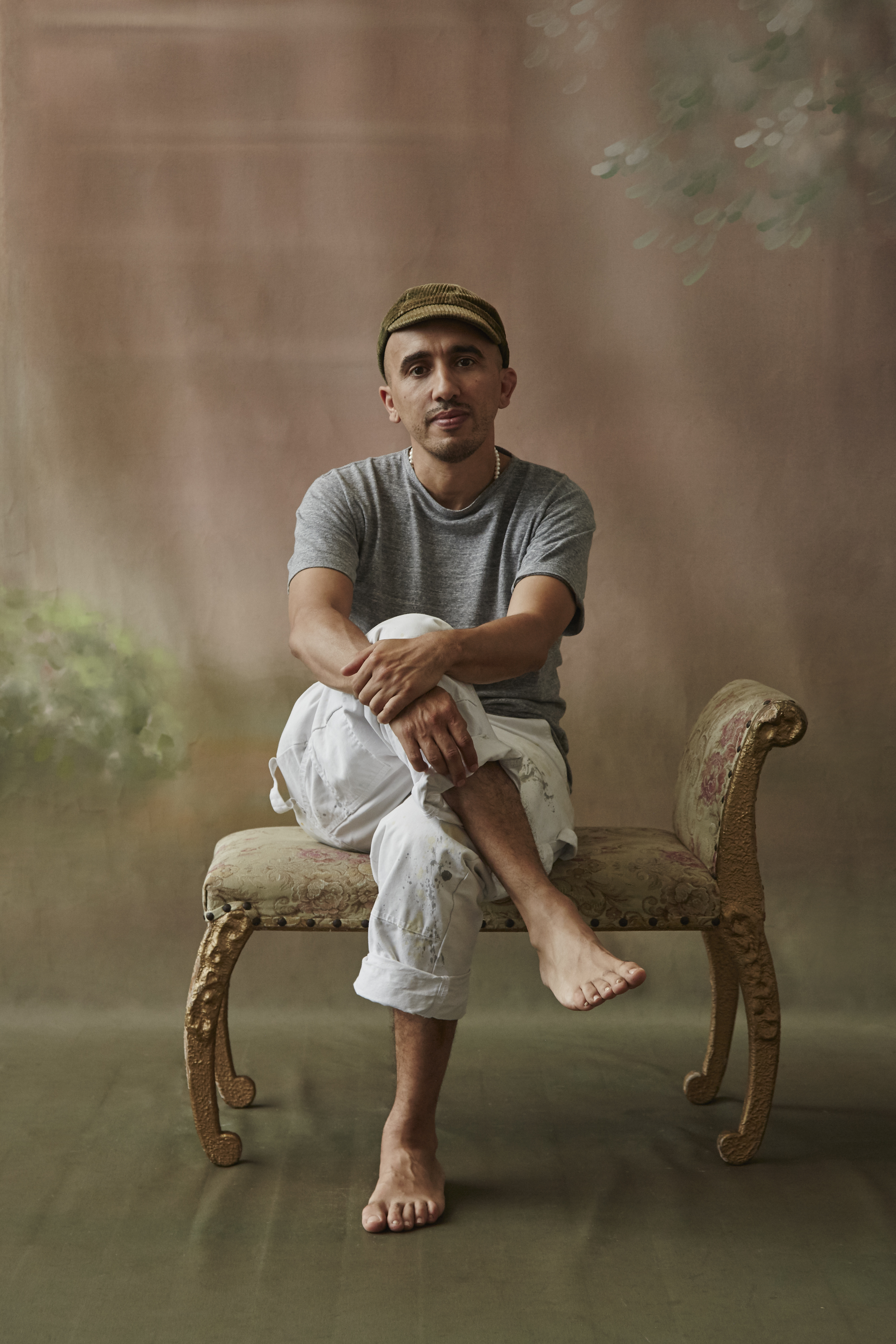
- Touhami in 2019
- Born: September 23, 1974 (age 51); Montauban, France
- Occupations: Creative director, entrepreneur
- Known for: Officine Universelle Buly 1803, Art Recherche Industrie, L'Épicerie, Cire Trudon
- Spouse: Victoire de Taillac-Touhami
- Children: 3
- Website: http://www.ramdane.com/

Ramdane Touhami (born 23 September 1974 in Montauban, France) is a French-Moroccan artist, creative director and entrepreneur.

Often described as "a multi-disciplinary and polymath entrepreneur," he has created different companies in the fashion, art, PR, and beauty industries since the early-1990s.

He first gained attention in the late 1990s as founder of L’Épicerie, a Paris concept store. Afterward he worked as a creative director for fashion and luxury houses, notably revamping Japan's And A., menswear at London's Liberty, and a new concept design for Barcelona's Santa Eulalia, before relaunching the world's oldest wax manufacturer Cire Trudon with modernized branding and scents.

In 2014, Touhami and his wife Victoire de Taillac-Touhami revived l’Officine Universelle Buly, an 1803 beauty and fragrance house later acquired by LVMH, expanding it internationally under their agency Art Recherche Industrie.

In 2020, he was named Chevalier des Arts et des Lettres (Knight of Arts and Letters) by the Government of France.

== Early life ==
Ramdane Touhami was born to a French Moroccan family of six in Montauban, a commune in the Occitanie region in southern France. His father was an agricultural worker.

When he was 12, he joined the team of "Radio Récré," (“Radio Recess” in French) created by his teacher at the Villebourbon middle school in Montauban, where he conducted interviews with political figures, including Jacques Chirac, then Prime Minister, who came to inaugurate a school in the neighboring town of Albias in 1987. The interview was rebroadcast on France Inter the following day.

He spent his childhood in the countryside, and while he was still in school, he created his own T-shirt brand, Teuchiland, parodied Timberland with a reference to cannabis. He made a fortune out of it, but then was kidnapped and robbed of all the revenue. Then, he dropped out of the boarding school, Touhami found himself on the wrong side of a Toulouse gang and escaped to Paris, where he was homeless for a year. He was stabbed and bears the scar to this day. In 1996, he launched "King Size", a French streetwear brand linked to skateboarding culture.

From there, he started his first concept store L’Epicerie in Paris, a trendy “park” where clothes, embodying the anti-Colette attitude, which quickly gained attention of the press such as Dazed & Confused, Herald Tribune, Le Monde, Vogue and The New York Times.

== Career ==
=== L'Épicerie (Paris concept store) ===
On September 17, 1998, Touhami opened the concept store L'Épicerie at 30 rue du Temple in the 3rd arrondissement. L'Épicerie was conceived as an anti-Colette, the famous concept store on rue Saint-Honoré. With his friend Artus de Lavilléon, he created this space, supporting designers and talent. Artists could present and sell all their ideas there, either independently or in collaboration. The concept attracted the interest of designers such as Jeremy Scott, Marc Jacobs, Jean Touitou, and Jérôme Dreyfuss.

L'Épicerie sometimes transformed into a music store or art gallery. The invitation and collaboration model with designers worked in multiple directions: "X for L'Épicerie," "L'Épicerie by X." Within a short time, L'Épicerie was described as "the hippest store in Europe" by publications including Dazed & Confused, Herald Tribune, Le Monde, Vogue Paris and The New York Times.

The shop closed on April 3, 1999.

=== Artistic Director of And.A in Tokyo ===
In 2000, Ramdane Touhami moved to Tokyo to take over the artistic direction of the brand And.A (styled &A), part of the Japanese Sazaby group, which sought to rehaul its image. On April 25, 2000, he assumed his position in Tokyo to establish a team, create offices, and develop new working conditions. Everything needed to be built: the collection, purchases, store creation and design, as well as the conception and implementation of the visual identity and image (press, communications, events).

From 2000 to 2001, as artistic director, he created two collections of clothing and accessories for And.A, and curated a selection of products (electronics, furniture, books, magazines, jewelry). The store identity was redefined along with the graphic image. He designed the store architecture and visual identity independently. He launched two collections, "College" and "Coolax," which each had their own graphic identity. Coolax was a way of suggesting that the real fun, the real fashions and real people are to be found on the streets.

In 2001, he launched the press office "VDT and T" with his partner Victoire de Taillac, whose clients included Aesop, Tod's, Dior, Louis Vuitton, Alaïa, Colette.

=== Launch of RT and Resistance ===
In 2003, he launched R.T, a new line of chic clothing with classic inspiration, entirely handmade by artisans. For R.T, he designed and developed his own fabrics and prints. All patterns were developed in Japan.

A second brand, Resistance, drew inspiration from a more urban aesthetic. It honored certain major political icons and historical figures. For Resistance, Touhami opted for an ephemeral shop before the wave of pop-up stores. The Parisian store, located in the heart of the Latin Quarter, was named the "bureau politique" (political office) and displayed no clothing in the window. He collaborated with Howie B, Hanjin Tan, Darius Khondji, Philippe Parreno, among others.

From 2003 to 2010, R.T. and Resistance clothing was sold in 180 retail locations around the world, including Maria Luisa in Paris, Nom de Guerre in New York, and Isetan in Tokyo. In April 2003, Ramdane Touhami became artistic director for the menswear selection at Liberty department store in London, where he designed collections, selected brands, and was responsible for the store architecture. In 2006, Touhami collaborated through Resistance with the Black Panther Party on an official collection celebrating the party's 40th anniversary.

The journey continued later in 2003 when he was invited by Liberty, the famous London department store to renovate their men's sector, while he reconceived the entire line and merchandising, assembling 56 small trendy brands to create a walk-in chic closet for men's wear, followed by his new concept design in 2010 for Santa Eulalia Barcelona, realizing a " bar à eaux de cologne " (perfume bar) as a perfume palette.

=== Beginnings in cosmetics with Victoire de Taillac ===
Upon his return from Japan in 2001, he temporarily left fashion to launch a new project with his wife Victoire de Taillac: Parfumerie Générale, a concept store specializing in cosmetics and beauty located in the 8th arrondissement of Paris. This concept store brought together nearly a hundred international brands. As artistic director, he created a graphic universe for the store that broke with conventional beauty retail aesthetics. A mailyorder catalog, website, and fanzine ("Beauty Notes") were created. A second retail location was opened at Printemps. The company was eventually sold in 2004.

In 2001, he participated in the Gumball 3000 automobile rally, and in 2004 he was considered a Gumball Veteran.

=== Revival of Cire Trudon, founded in 1643 ===
Two years later, in 2006, the owner of a French candle house, Cire Trudon, offered Ramdane Touhami the opportunity to take over the company with him and relaunch it. A historical French candlemaker established in 1643, which had remained asleep for more than 350 years. To bring forth the lost history, he went back to the original name, reimagined the boutique, improved the original formula using vegetable wax, and created 20 perfumes for the line of scented candles, with each one having its own story that are often linked to the history of the brand or the larger one of France. After studying its archives, he rediscovered the history of "Manufacture Trudon," a company founded in 1643 that held the title of "chandler to the King." He successfully relaunched the brand with scented candles bearing evocative names; Cire Trudon's creations were named "Best candle of 2011" by Wallpaper magazine and "Perfect candles" by The Daily Telegraph in England. The candles were sold in over 600 stores worldwide, including Selfridges in London, Barneys and Bergdorf Goodman in New York, and Le Bon Marché in Paris. Ramdane Touhami sold his shares in 2011.

In 2014, Ramdane Touhami helped Cole Alexander of the band The Black Lips create scents for their concerts.

=== Revival of the Officine Universelle Buly, founded in 1803 ===
In 2014, he established his own beauty brand Officine Universelle Buly at 6 rue Bonaparte in the 6th district in Paris with his wife, Victoire de Taillac-Touhami. The brand was initially founded by Jean-Vincent Bully in 1803, later revived by the duo.

Bully inspired the novel César Birotteau written by Honoré de Balzac in 1839. An old-fashioned perfumery, Officine Universelle Buly 1803, claims an openness to beauty secrets from around the world and a valorization of beauty history. Bully founded his own perfumery in 1803 and subsequently invented the vinegar toilet lotion branded Bully. One hundred eighty-two years later, Ramdane Touhami decided to relaunch the Bully perfumery. The name lost a consonant to avoid offending English-speaking clientele, as "bully" has negative connotations. Officine Universelle Buly thus took its first steps into modernity.

His thirst for knowledge and respect for traditions drove Touhami ever further around the globe to find the rarest cosmetic ingredients. Having collected 19th-century beauty secrets, these were sold at the heart of the first Parisian beauty Officine, at 6 rue Bonaparte, in the 6th arrondissement. Since then, the brand has been present in a dozen countries in Europe and Asia: Taipei, Tokyo, New York, London, Hong Kong, Seoul, in over forty boutiques and retail corners with a design that blends Buly's aesthetic codes with the cultural specificities of each country.

In 2019, Buly 1803 collaborated with the Louvre. Perfumers were invited to create a selection of eight fragrances whose names and olfactory compositions illustrated eight masterpieces exhibited at the Louvre, such as the Winged Victory of Samothrace or the Venus de Milo. The collaboration attracted significant media interest and achieved considerable commercial success.

In October 2021, the brand Bully was acquired by LVMH. In 2025, the brand relocates to the Saint-Germain district of Paris.

=== Art Recherche Industrie ===
In June 2019, he established his own creative agency called Art Recherche Industrie, an artistic creation agency working in major aesthetic fields such as architecture, graphic design, and typography, distinguishing itself by "an original modus operandi: advocating home-made and zero-outsourcing". It is through Art Recherche Industrie that Touhami continues to create for Officine Universelle Buly as artistic director, but also for other houses such as the silversmith Christofle and the trunk maker Moynat.

In 2018, through ARI, Ramdane touhami took over L'Atelier Lejeusne, a Parisian printer which is the last embossing workshop in France using a balance press. The company is labeled as a Living Herritage Company (Entreprise du Patrimoine Vivant).

The Art Recherche Industrie agency is located in the 10th arrondissement of Paris in a former 19th-century ballroom, redecorated by Touhami, which the English magazine Wallpaper stated might be "the most beautiful offices in the world."

Through the agency, he created S.H.I.T, Société Helvétique d'Impression Typographique (Swiss Typographic Printing Company) which notably prints WAM magazine, a publication created by Art Recherche Industrie.

In 2025, Art Recherche Industrie created the Zacaffe coffee chain for the clothing brand Zara, with shops in Madrid, A Coruña, Nanjing, and Seoul.

In July 2025, Amina Muaddi called upon Art Recherche Industrie for the opening of her Parisian store.

=== Entrepreneur ===
Despite his experience in art direction, Ramdane identifies himself more with "the logic of an entrepreneur". In 2003, he started his own tailor-made menswear brand R.T., for which he drew and developed his own fabrics and prints, followed by Résistance with a more urban style, honoring some of the most important historic and political icons. R.T. & Résistance has been sold in 180 retail stores around the world: " Maria Luisa " in Paris, " Nom de guerre " in New York City, " Isetan " in Tokyo, among others, and seen collaborations such as with the Black Panther Party for its 40th anniversary.

As his attention shifted from fashion to fragrances, Ramdane started his own scent studio Architecture Olfactive right after his work at Cire Trudon in 2010. The studio has designed numerous signature scents for various brands and companies, such as The Kooples in Paris, Barney's and the Mercer Hotel in New York, Santa Eulalia in Barcelona, as well as the Shangri-La hotels and palaces, together with imagination of scents for events.

In March 2025, Mediapart accused him of harsh management practices. In his right of reply, he acknowledged "blunt speaking and an attitude that rattles" but denied engaging in illegal or discriminatory behavior.

=== The Gazoline Stand ===
In 2022, he opened "The Gazoline Stand" a "gas station with fuel for cars and humans" with a snack stand offering sweets and beverages imported from around the world.

=== Opening of two bookstores ===
In January 2023, Ramdane Touhami opened La Pharmacie des âmes (The Pharmacy for the soul) within the walls of a former pharmacy in the 7th arrondissement of Paris, a bookstore where literary classics coexist with anti-racist and activist works by 20th-century figures.

This bookstore transformed the next year : In September 2024, another bookstore space named The Radical Media Archive opened in the new shop Words Sounds Colors and Shapes. It is dedicated to revolutionary graphic design and counterculture design.

=== Les Nouvelles éditions du réveil ===
In 2023, he launched a publishing house, Les Nouvelles éditions du réveil, whose books are released exclusively in paperback format. The autobiographical narrative "Comment sortir du monde" (how to exit the world) by Marouane Bakhti was its first publication, acclaimed by critics, followed by "Dark Tintin" by Mark Alizart, whose initial publication by Flammarion had been cancelled, then "Les Princes de Cocagne" by anthropologist Slimane Touhami.

=== Hotel Drei Berge ===
In 2022, he purchased the Hotel Bellevue in the Swiss alpine village of Mürren with the intention of redesigning it. He renamed it the Drei Berge Hotel ("three mountains" in German) in reference to the Eiger, Mönch, and Jungfrau mountains that face the hotel, and opened it in October 2023.

The English magazine Tatler awarded it the title of best bedding of the year (Best Bedding).

Two rooms were decorated in collaboration with the American brand Bode.

=== Permanent Files ===
In 2023, Ramdane Touhami created a second agency with creative director Léonard Vernhet :Permanent Files. It also publishes the magazine Useless Fighters and operates an art gallery specializing in contemporary imagery.

=== A Young Hiker ===
In January 2024, the shop A Young Hiker opened in the Palais Royal gallery in Paris. Ramdane Touhami offers a selection of mountain and hiking clothing there. The shop moved in September 2024 to a larger space in the Marais, within the new shop Words Sounds Colors and Shapes.

=== Words Sounds Colors and Shapes ===
In September 2024, he opened the shop Words Sounds Colors and Shapes in the Marais district of Paris, named in hommage to the jazz album of the same title by jazzman Donald Byrd.

This space brings together the A Young Hiker store, a café, an art gallery, and the Radical Media Archive bookstore.

In May 2025, a second Words Sounds Colors and Shapes shop opened in Tokyo.

== Collaborations and side projects ==
- Development of the concept store of Jean-Charles de Castelbajac. He brought in Ariel Wizman for the musical programming and Yorgo Tloupas for the graphic design.
- Creation in 1999 for Le Bon Marché of a "hype corner" on the Left Bank. He installed "33 1 R lax," which brought together magazines, records, electronic products, furniture, objects, etc. In collaboration with Yorgo Tloupas, he also created the visual identity of the space.
- Artistic director of the first and only issue of the magazine Téléramadan. A magazine created by Mehdi Meklat, Badroudine Said Abdallah, and journalist Mouloud Achour, which stated in its editorial: "We are the Great Replacement".
- Costume design for the theater piece "Il Tempo Del Postino" by Hans-Ulrich Obrist and Philippe Parreno, which opened at the Manchester Opera House in 2007.
- Participation in the exhibition "30 Years of Hello Kitty" at the Mori Art Museum in Tokyo.
- Regular contributor to the magazine Jalouse, L'Officiel, V Magazine, Intersection.
- Collaboration on the 40th anniversary of the Black Panthers.
- Launch of the beauty magazine "Corpus" with Victoire de Taillac.
- Judge at the "Wallpaper* Design Awards 2017".
- In June 2024, he was artistic director of the track No Pasaràn, a rap song in reaction to the high score of the National Rally (Rassemblement National) in the 2024 French legislative elections.
- He was guest editor-in-chef of the Japanese magazine BRUTUS for its February 2025 issue.

== Politics ==
Ramdane Touhami is known for his left-wing political positions, notably against state racism and for the Palestinian cause, positions for which he has been the target of attacks perpetrated by far-right groups. In a profile, L'Express describes him as "decolonial and close to Jean-Luc Mélenchon." Le Nouvel Obs speaks of a "man of taste and power whose ambition is to awaken the young generation from immigrant backgrounds."

== Personal life ==
Ramdane is married to Victoire de Taillac-Touhami, a beauty expert and ex-director of public relations for emblematic concept store Colette. They have been close partners since their meeting in the 90s, both romantically and professionally.

The couple now live in Paris, France, with their three children.

== Awards and honours ==
In the summer of 2020, Touhami was granted Chevalier des Arts et des Lettres (Knight of Arts and Letters).

== Books and publications ==
- An Atlas of Natural Beauty (U.K. edition), 2017, Ebury Press. ISBN 978-1-78503-494-7
- Atlas de la beauté au naturel (French), 2017, edition originale Ebury Press. ISBN 978-2-232-14494-3
- An Atlas of Natural Beauty (U.S. edition), 2018, Simon & Schuster. ISBN 978-1-5011-9735-2
- WAM Magazine, Ramdane Touhami's egocentric magazine, 2020, published by Art Recherche Industrie
- Атлас естественной красоты (Russia edition), 2020, Azbooka. ISBN 978-5-389-16265-5
- The Beauty of Time Travel, The Work of Ramdane Touhami and the Agency Art Recherche Industrie for Officine Universelle Buly, 2021, gestalten. ISBN 978-3-96704-019-7
- Radical Media Archive vol.1/7, An Anthology of Counterculture and Political Graphic Design, 2024, Permanent Files. ISBN 978-2-95959-990-3
- Useless Fighters magazine, numéro 1, 2024, ISBN 978-2-9593041-0-1
- Useless Fighters magazine, numéro 2, 2025, ISBN 978-2-9593041-1-8

== Films ==
"View on the Sea" with Artus de Lavilléon.

== Podcasts ==
Ramdane Touhami hosts the pdocast "Procrastinophobic", in which he interviewq personalities from the worlds of fashion, art, design, and politics, such as Junya Takahashi, Nigo, Vijay Prashad, Laraaji, and Yvon Lambert.
