= Casey Thompson (chef) =

American chef and restaurateur (born 1978)

- Born: January 21, 1978 (age 48); United States
- Culinary career
- Current restaurant(s): Duchess, Fort Worth, Texas (2025–)
- Previous restaurants: The Mansion Restaurant on Turtle Creek, Dallas, Texas; Shinsei, Dallas, Texas (?–2008); Brownstone, Fort Worth, Texas; Morada, Rancho Santa Fe, California (2017); Aveline, San Francisco, California (2014); Folktable, Sonoma, California (2020–2024)
- Television shows: Top Chef: Miami; Top Chef: All-Stars; Top Chef: Charleston; Tournament of Champions Season 5; Guy’s Grocery Games

Casey Thompson (born January 21, 1978) is an American chef and restaurateur from Dallas, Texas. Between 2020 and 2024, she was the executive chef at Folktable, a restaurant in Sonoma, California. In 2025, she became the consultant chef at Duchess, a restaurant at the New Nobleman Hotel in Fort Worth, Texas.

Thompson was a contestant on Top Chef: Miami, the third season of the television series Top Chef, in which she finished as runner-up and was voted Fan Favorite. She also appeared in Top Chef: All-Stars (season 8) and Top Chef: Charleston (season 14), and was a guest judge in episode 7 of Top Chef Junior.

== Career ==
Thompson's professional start came at Dallas' The Mansion Restaurant, at Rosewood Mansion on Turtle Creek, under head chef Dean Fearing, where she worked her way up from a prep cook to becoming the sous chef. She later became executive chef at Shinsei, a Pan-Asian restaurant in Dallas.

Thompson was formerly executive chef at Brownstone in Fort Worth, Texas, and, between June and November 2014, the owner of Aveline at the Warwick Hotel in San Francisco, which she named after her grandmothers.

In 2017, Thompson became executive chef at Morada, the restaurant at The Inn at Rancho Santa Fe.

She was due to open Georgette as a partner in late 2020, but it was put on hold due to COVID-19.

Thompson is a spokesperson for Terrazas de los Andes, a Moet-Hennessey brand.

=== Folktable ===
Between December 2020 and November 2024, Thompson was the executive chef at Folktable, a restaurant at Cornerstone Sonoma marketplace in Sonoma, California.

In September 2021, just over a year into Thompson's time at the restaurant, it was named a Michelin Guide Bib Gourmand establishment. It retained the accolade in 2022 and 2023.

The restaurant closed in 2024, after four years in business.

In 2025, Thompson became the consultant chef at Duchess, a restaurant at the New Nobleman Hotel in Fort Worth, Texas.

== Personal life ==
Thompson has been married to Michael DeSantis, co-owner of Harumph Wines, since 2008.
