= The Mansion Restaurant =

Restaurant in Dallas, Texas, US

- Interactive map of the The Mansion Restaurant area

General information
- Architectural style: Italian Renaissance
- Location: Turtle Creek, Dallas, Texas, U.S., 2821 Turtle Creek Boulevard
- Coordinates: 32.8047679°N 96.80685303°W
- Completed: 1925; 101 years ago

The Mansion Restaurant is a restaurant in Turtle Creek, Dallas, Texas, United States. Located at 2821 Turtle Creek Boulevard, the restaurant, which occupies the former 1925 home of cotton magnate Sheppard King and later owned by oilman Toddie Lee Wynne, is the signature restaurant of Rosewood Mansion on Turtle Creek. Established in 1980 by oil heiress Caroline Rose Hunt, it has been described as "one of the last storied, formal restaurants in the United States." It was renovated in 2007.

The restaurant's executive chef is Sebastien Archambault. Dean Fearing was formerly head chef at the restaurant, under whom Casey Thompson worked at the beginning of her career. Others that have filled the same role include Avner Samuel, John Tesar and Bruno Davaillon.

== See also ==
- List of restaurants in Dallas
