= 24s =

24s may refer to:

== Music ==
- "24's (T.I. song)", a single by rapper T.I.
- "24's (RichGirl song), a single by RichGirl

== Other ==
- 24S, an online fashion company
- 24s, the FAA identifier for Pinehurst State Airport in Jackson County, Oregon, USA
