= Henry Racamier =

French businessman (1912–2003)

- Born: Henri Serge Racamier; June 25, 1912; Pont-de-Roide, France
- Died: April 1, 2003 (aged 90); Italy
- Education: HEC Paris
- Occupations: Industrialist, businessman
- Years active: 1936-1990
- Known for: Co-founding LVMH
- Spouse: Odile Vuitton
- Children: 2

Henri Serge Racamier (June 25, 1912 – March 29, 2003) was a French industrialist and businessman. He was primarily known for co-founding the luxury conglomerate LVMH and turning Louis Vuitton into an internationally recognized brand with billions of dollars in sales.

== Life ==
Racamier was born in Pont-de-Roide-Vermondans in the Franche-Comté region of France. His youngest brother was psychiatrist and psychoanalyst Paul-Claude Racamier. He was the son of an industrialist. After acquiring a business degree at HEC Paris, he started his career in the steel industry as he began to work for the Peugeot automotive factories in 1936. In 1946, he founded his own company, Stinox, which he sold to Thyssen in 1977. With the assets gained through the sale, he took over the reins at Louis Vuitton the same year.

He began to change the business model substantially, and turned the then small leather goods shops, into an international network of company operated shops worldwide to sell the merchandise. In order to make the brand notable on an international scale, he started to sponsor top-of-the-range sporting events and created a new marketing strategy which would lead the brand to the top and be well known worldwide. In 1984, he took Louis Vuitton public at the stock exchange. In 1987, he merged Moet Hennessy and Louis Vuitton creating LVMH. Between 1987 and 1990 he and Alain Chevalier, the other co-founder of the luxury group conducted an open war against Bernard Arnault who was taking over power; Arnault was successful and ejected Racamier from the company board by 1990.

After being forced out of LVMH, Racamier, used a family holding company Orcofi, to join the French banking group Paribas and L'Oréal in order to take part in a M&A deal and acquire the fashion house Lanvin. It was thought by branch insiders that he would form another competitor to LVMH, instead he turned to sailing and music. He was a major patron and philanthropist to the Opéra National de Paris.

Racamier was also a noted sponsor of international sailing competitions and in 2019 was posthumously inducted into the America's Cup Hall of Fame.

== Family ==
In 1943, he married Odile Madeleine Andrée (née Vuitton; 1921–2019), a great-granddaughter of the company founder Louis Vuitton. They had two daughters, Caroline Bentz (née Racamier) and Laurence Fontaine (née Racamier).
