= Patrick Léon =

French winemaker

Patrick Léon (born 1943 in Bordeaux, died 2018 in Bordeaux) was a French winemaker.

He worked for Alexis Lichine, Château Mouton Rothschild, and Sacha Lichine.

Léon studied oenology at Bordeaux University, where he was taught by Émile Peynaud, graduating in 1964. He started an oenology laboratory at the Gironde Chamber of Agriculture with Jacques Blouin in 1967. By 1972, he was technical director for Alexis Lichine, working at Château Lascombes in Margaux and Château Castera in Lesparre-Médoc.

He joined Mouton Rothschild Group in the early 1980s, becoming technical director in 1984 and finally group managing director. He left in 2003 or 2004.

He became a wine consultant, working for clients such as Château Biac in Bordeaux; from 2006 at Château d'Esclans in Provence for Sacha Lichine; at Opus One in Napa; as well as clients in Burgundy, Sancerre, Rioja, Chile, and Japan.

He bought Château Les Trois Croix in Fronsac in 1995. He was married to Yvette and had three children. He died in 2018 aged 75. His son Bertrand became technical director at d'Esclans in 2011, and also took over the management of Les Trois Croix.
