= Investir =

Monthly French business magazine (1974–2011)

- Categories: Business magazine
- Frequency: Monthly
- Publisher: Investir Publications SA
- Founded: 1974
- Final issue: 2011
- Country: France
- Based in: Paris
- Language: French

Investir was a monthly business magazine published in Paris between 1974 and 2011. The magazine merged with Le Journal des Finances to create a new weekly, Investir-Le Journal des Finances in late January 2011.

== History and profile ==
Investir was established in 1974. Its first issue was released on 28 January 1974 with Gérard Vidalenche as publication director. It was relaunched in 1988. The magazine had been published by Hachette Filipacchi until 2001 when it began to be published Quebecor World Inc. Its headquarters was in Paris.

It provided in-depth analyses and practical tips for managing the assets to its readers and audience, including major companies in the country. The magazine founded Actionnaira which was a personal investment trade show and organized numerous trade-related events and activities.

Jacques Derouin was among the editors-in-chief of Investir who left the post in August 2005. He also held the same post for Investir Hebdo, a weekly sister magazine of Investir. On 5 February 2011 Investir merged with another business magazine, Journal des Finances, to form Investir-Le Journal des Finances. The new magazine is part of Les Echos-Le Parisien Group, the media and publishing subsidiary of LVMH Moet Hennessy Louis Vuitton.

== Circulation ==
The circulation of Investir was 108,000 copies in 1994. In 1997 the magazine sold 100,000 copies. Its circulation became 190,000 copies in 1999. At the beginning of the 2000s Investir was one of three leading business magazines in France with higher circulation than the others.

During the period of 2007-2008 the circulation of Investir was 98,000 copies.
