= 24S =

Online fashion retail platform

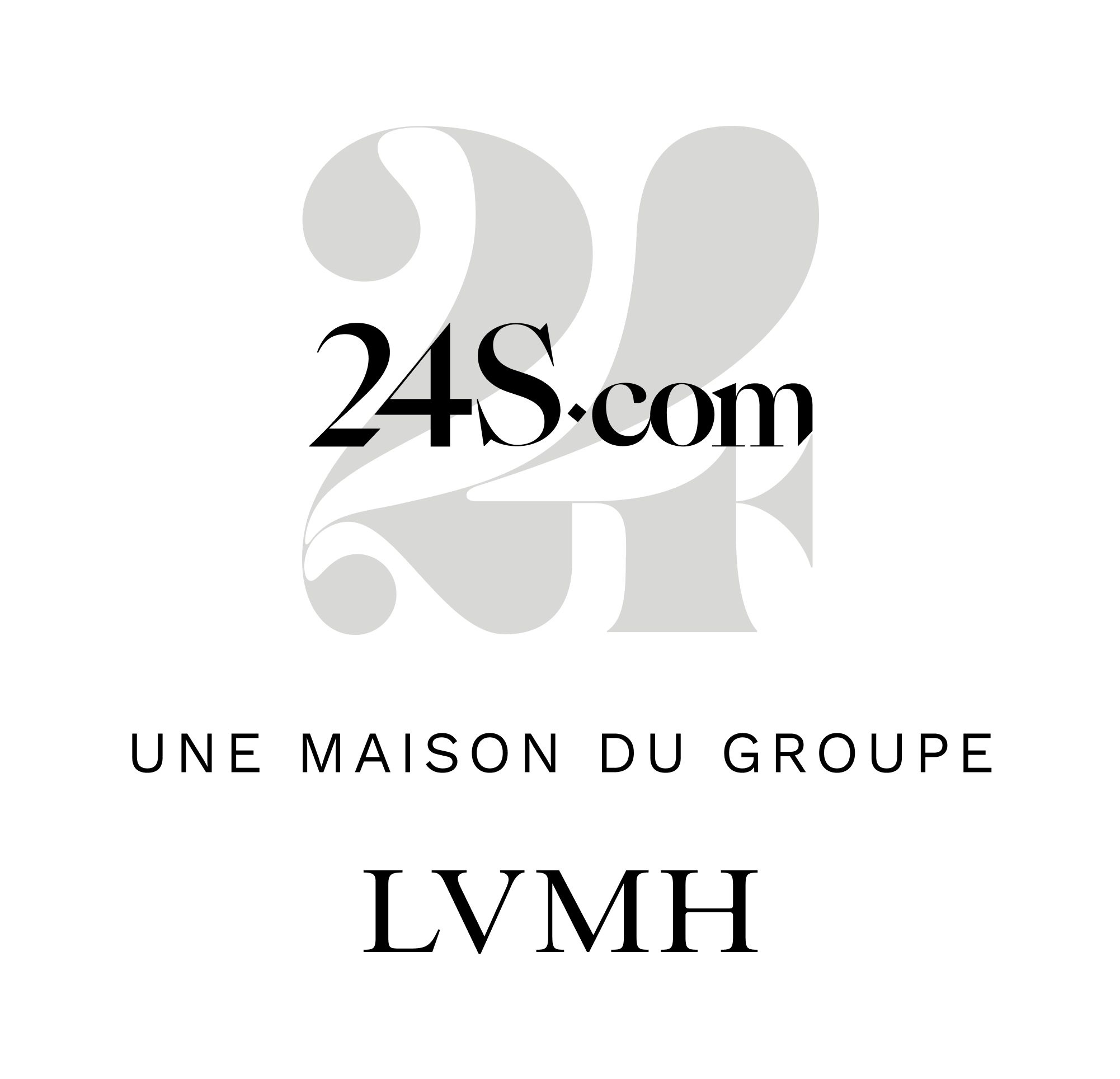
- Website type: Online shopping
- Available in: 4 languages
- List of languages English, French, German, Korean
- Headquarters: Paris, {{{location_country}}}
- CEO: Laura Pho Duc
- Industry: E-commerce
- Products: Designer fashion
- Parent: LVMH
- Website: www.24s.com
- Launched: 6 June 2017

24S (formerly known as 24 Sèvres) is a French e-commerce luxury fashion company that went live on 6 June 2017. The site was launched by LVMH as an online equivalent to Le Bon Marché, a department store the company had acquired in 1984.

== Overview ==
Eric Goguey, the first chief executive officer, claimed at the time of launch that 24 Sèvres would compete against the online fashion giants Farfetch and Net-a-Porter, with an added focus on the style of Paris. Initially offering womenswear only, the company expanded into menswear in 2019, before returning to an offer aimed at women in 2026. Also in 2019, the site rebranded from 24 Sèvres to 24S. The brand supports several young talents from the fashion industry, with the most recent examples including Ashlynn Parks, Tokyo James or Satoshi Kuwata.
