= Doubs =

Department of France in Bourgogne-Franche-Comté

Doubs Dubs (Arpitan)
- Department
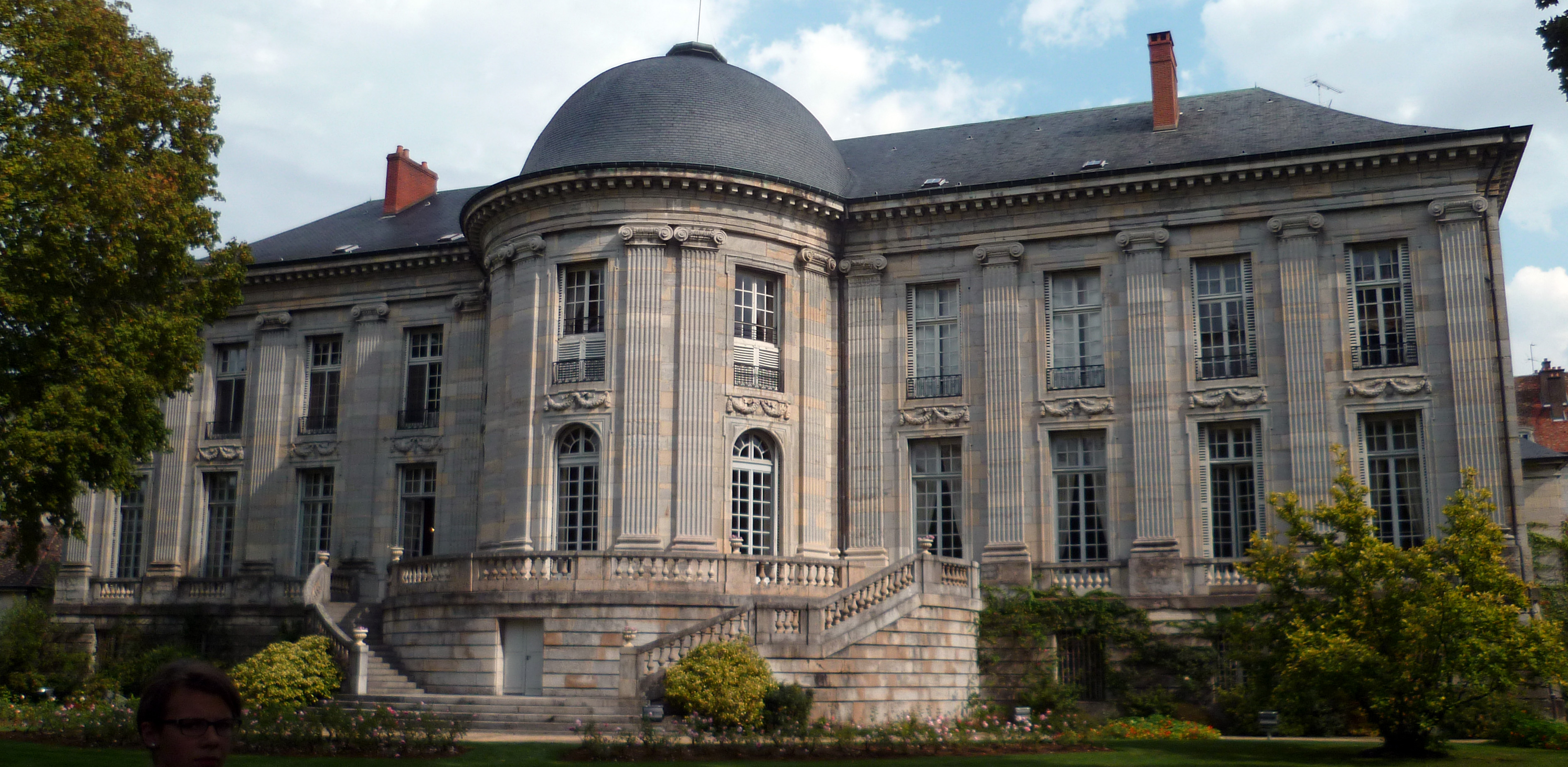
- Prefecture building in Besançon

- Flag Coat of arms

- Location of Doubs in France
- Coordinates: 47°10′N 06°25′E
- Country: France
- Region: Bourgogne-Franche-Comté
- Prefecture: Besançon
- Subprefectures: Montbéliard; Pontarlier

Government
  - President of the Departmental Council: Christine Bouquin (LR)

Area^{1}
  - Total: 5,232.6 km^{2} (2,020.3 sq mi)

Population (2023)
  - Total: 547,163
  - Rank: 49th
  - Density: 104.57/km^{2} (270.83/sq mi)
- Time zone: UTC+1 (CET)
  - Summer (DST): UTC+2 (CEST)
- ISO 3166 code: FR-25
- Department number: 25
- Arrondissements: 3
- Cantons: 19
- Communes: 563
- ^1 French Land Register data, which exclude estuaries and lakes, ponds and glaciers larger than 1 km^{2}

Doubs (/duː/ DOO; French: [du]; Arpitan: Dubs) is an administrative department in the northeastern French region of Bourgogne-Franche-Comté. Named after the river Doubs, it had a population of 547,163 in 2023. Its prefecture is Besançon and subprefectures are Montbéliard and Pontarlier.

Situated in the east of France and the east of Bourgogne-Franche-Comté region, it shares a border with Switzerland of almost 170 km and most of its territory is located in the Jura Mountains. Its highest point is the Mont d'Or (1,463 m), and the three main rivers that flow through it are the Doubs, the Ognon and the Loue.

Economically, the Doubs département is one of the most industrialised in France, specialising in car manufacturing with the historic location of the Peugeot plant (Stellantis group) in Sochaux, metalworking and food processing. The Doubs is also home to many companies in the microtechnology sector, as well as being the historic cradle of the French watchmaking industry. Its agriculture, mainly focused on livestock and milk production, is symbolised by cheeses such as comté, mont d'or, morbier, and cancoillotte, and by charcuteries such as Morteau sausage, Montbéliard sausage, and smoked ham.

The department's main tourist attractions are the citadel of Besançon and the Royal Saltworks at Arc-et-Senans, both UNESCO World Heritage Sites, as well as the Château de Joux. The Doubs is renowned for its many remarkable natural sites, including the Lac de Saint-Point, the Saut du Doubs, the sources of the Doubs, Loue and Lison rivers, the Cirque de Consolation, the Grotte d'Osselle and the Gouffre de Poudrey.

== History ==
As early as the 13th century, inhabitants of the northern two-thirds of Doubs spoke Franc-Comtois, a dialect of the langues d'oïl. Residents of the southern third of Doubs spoke a dialect of the Arpitan language. Both languages co-existed with French, the official language of law and commerce, and continued to be spoken frequently in rural areas into the 20th century. They are both still spoken today but not on a daily basis.

Doubs was important as a portal to Switzerland through the pass at Cluse de Pontarlier. Many famous people, including Mirabeau, Toussaint Louverture and Heinrich von Kleist, were imprisoned in the Château de Joux.

Doubs is one of the original 83 departments created during the French Revolution on 4 March 1790. It was created from part of the former province of Franche-Comté. The prefecture (capital) is Besançon.

In 1793, the republic of Mandeure was annexed by France and incorporated into the department. This district was passed between various territories and departments in the ensuing administrative reorganisations and wars, but was restored to Doubs in 1816 when the former principality of Montbéliard was also added to the department.

However, the commune of Le Cerneux-Péquignot was annexed by the Canton of Neuchâtel under the terms of the 1814 Treaty of Paris, and since remained Swiss territory.

Between the defeat of France at the Battle of Waterloo and November 1818, Doubs was included in the area occupied by Austrian troops.

Victor Hugo, Gustave Courbet, Armand Peugeot, Auguste and Louis Lumière and Frank Darabont are among the famous people born in Doubs.

== Geography ==
Doubs is part of the current region of Bourgogne-Franche-Comté and is surrounded by the French departments of Jura, Haute-Saône, and Territoire de Belfort, and the Swiss cantons of Vaud, Neuchâtel, and Jura.

The department is dominated by the Jura Mountains, which rise east of Besançon.

=== Principal towns ===
The most populous commune is Besançon, the prefecture. As of 2019, there are 5 communes with more than 10,000 inhabitants:

Commune	Population (2023)
Besançon	118,489
Montbéliard	24,672
Pontarlier	18,067
Audincourt	14,071
Valentigney	10,501

== Demographics ==
The inhabitants of the department are called Doubiens in French.

Population development since 1791:

Historical population

Year	Pop.	±% p.a.
1791	219,642	—
1801	216,226	−0.16%
1806	226,040	+0.89%
1821	242,663	+0.47%
1831	265,535	+0.90%
1841	286,236	+0.75%
1851	296,679	+0.36%
1861	296,280	−0.01%
1872	291,251	−0.16%
1881	310,827	+0.73%
1891	303,081	−0.25%
1901	298,864	−0.14%
1911	299,935	+0.04%
1921	285,022	−0.51%

Year	Pop.	±% p.a.
1931	305,500	+0.70%
1936	304,812	−0.05%
1946	298,255	−0.22%
1954	327,187	+1.16%
1962	384,881	+2.05%
1968	426,458	+1.72%
1975	471,082	+1.43%
1982	477,163	+0.18%
1990	484,770	+0.20%
1999	499,062	+0.32%
2007	520,133	+0.52%
2012	531,062	+0.42%
2017	539,067	+0.30%
2023	547,163	+0.25%

== Politics ==
The President of the Departmental Council is Christine Bouquin (LR).

Party		seats
•	The Republicans	24
	Socialist Party	12
	Renaissance	2

=== National Assembly Representatives ===
Constituency	Member	Party
Doubs's 1st constituency	Laurent Croizier	Democratic Movement
Doubs's 2nd constituency	Dominique Voynet	The Ecologists
Doubs's 3rd constituency	Matthieu Bloch	Union of the Right for the Republic
Doubs's 4th constituency	Géraldine Grangier	National Rally
Doubs's 5th constituency	Annie Genevard	The Republicans

== Economy ==
The Doubs department is at the same time the greenest and the most industrialized in France.

It is the birthplace of the automotive manufacturer Peugeot.

== Tourism ==
The castle of Joux and Besançon are important tourist destinations.

== Notable people ==
- Paul-Claude Racamier (1924–1996), psychiatrist and psychoanalyst
- Arnaud Courlet de Vregille (1958-), French painter

== Gallery ==
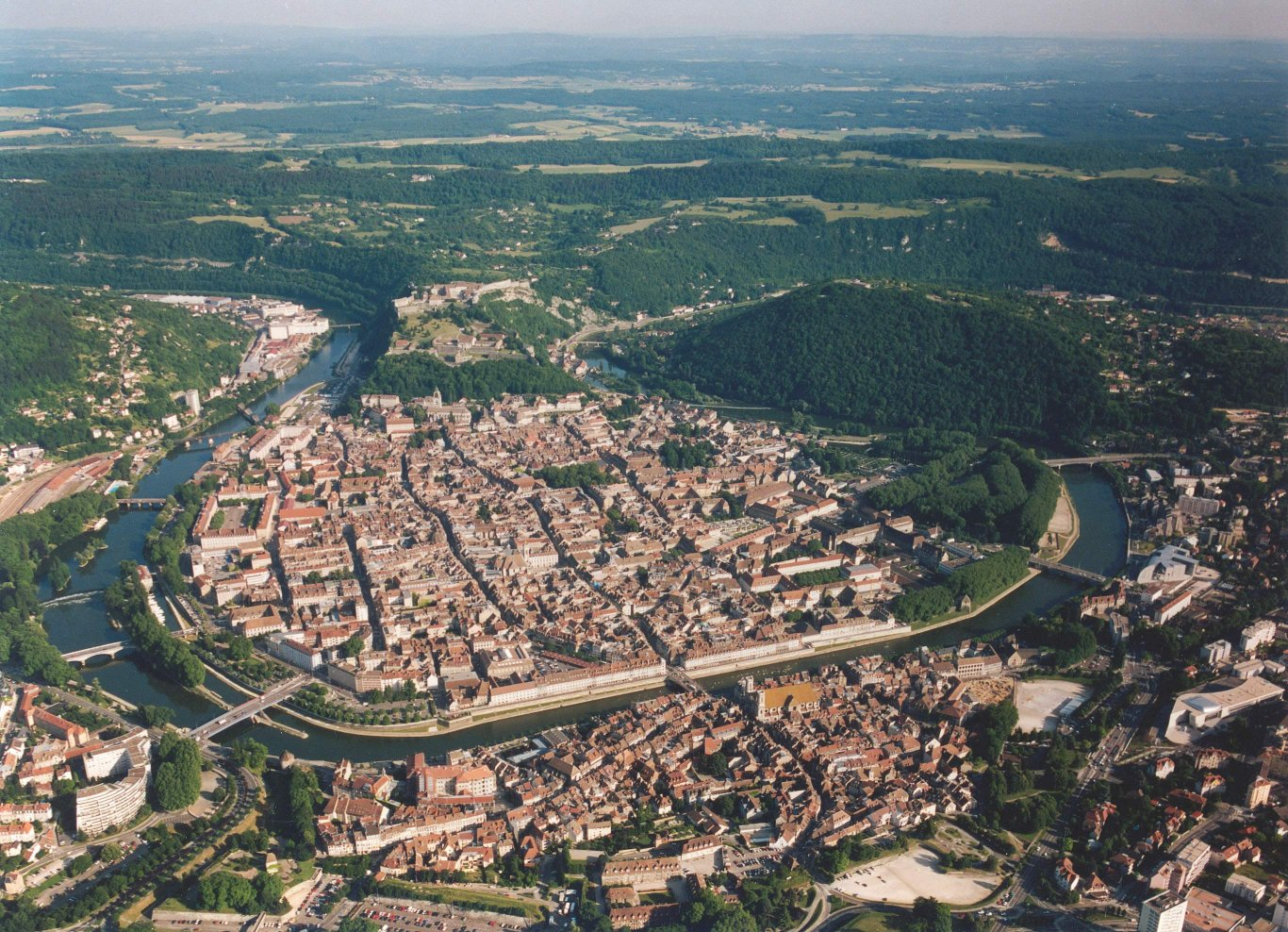
The citadel and the old town of Besançon in a meander of the Doubs

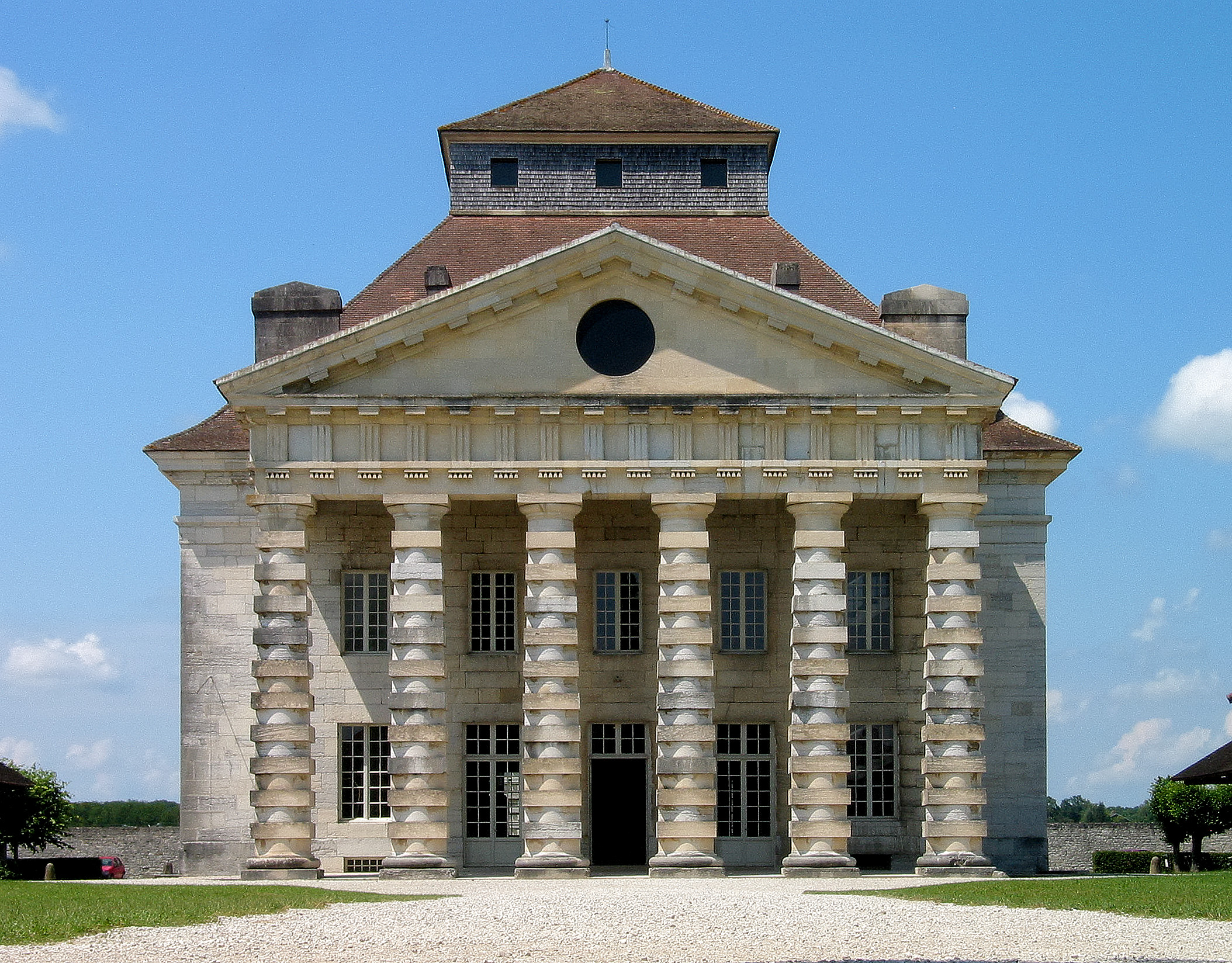
Royal Saltworks at Arc-et-Senans

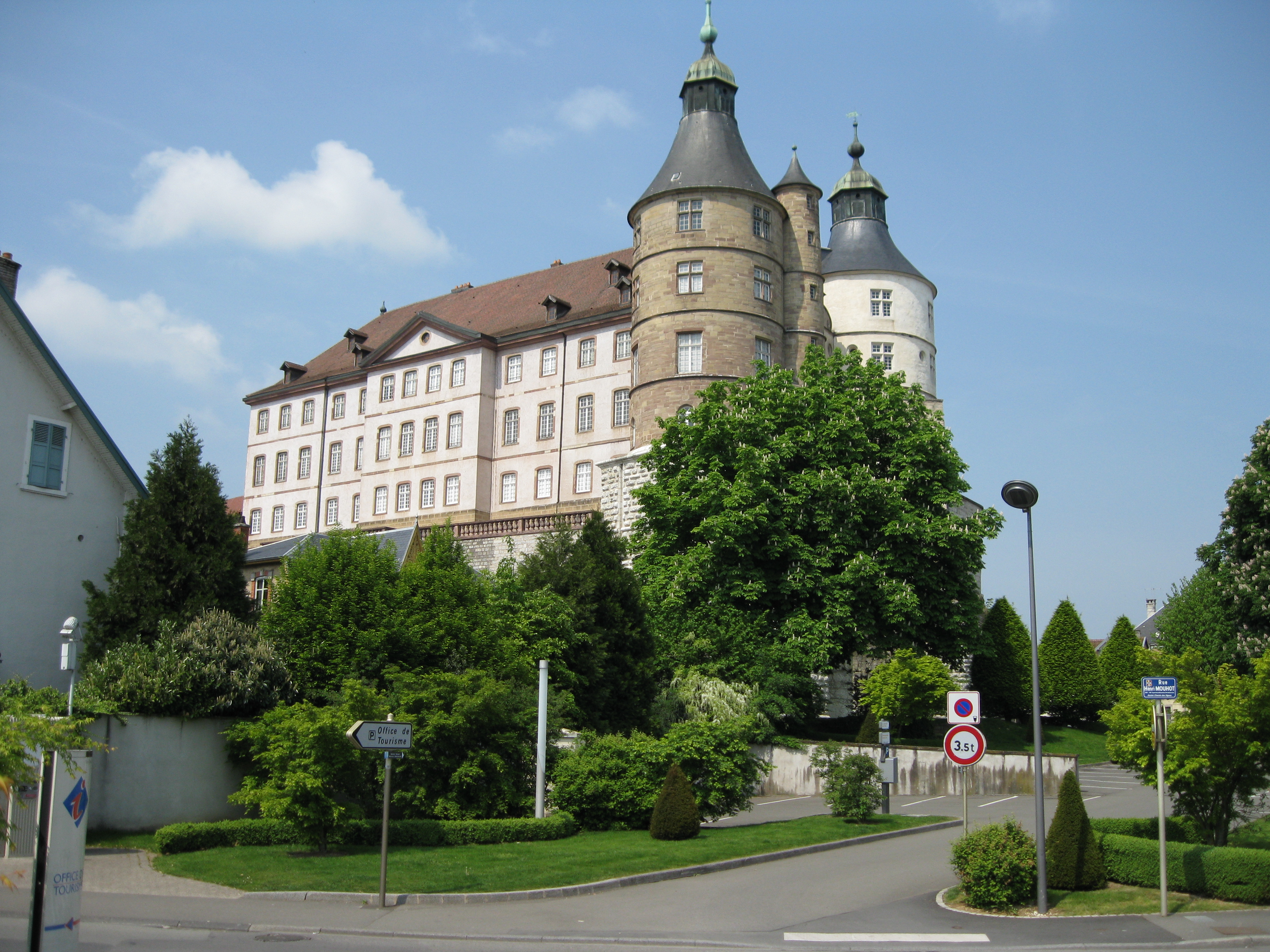
Montbéliard

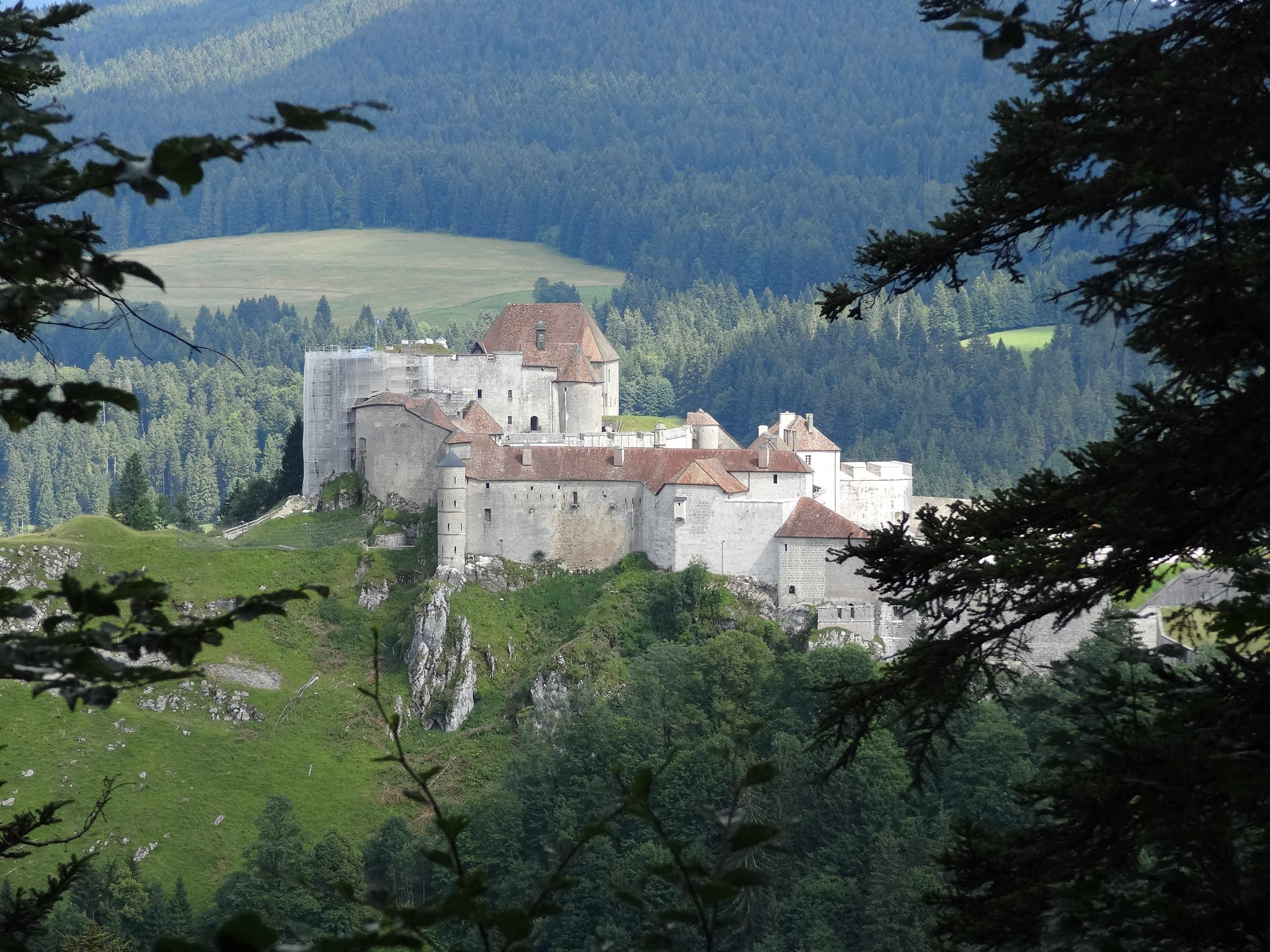
Fort de Joux

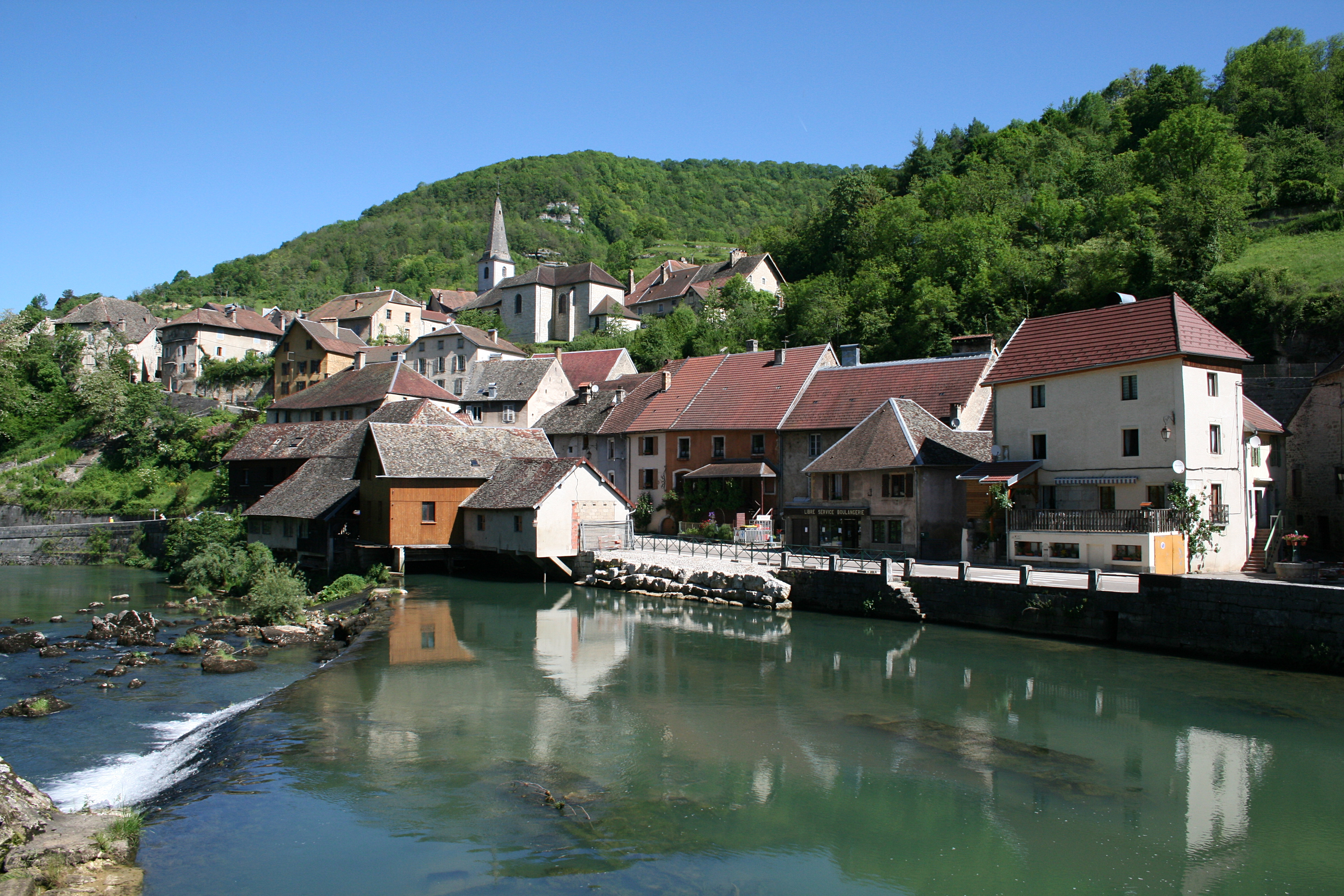
Lods, one of the most beautiful villages of France

== See also ==
- Arrondissements of the Doubs department
- Cantons of the Doubs department
- Communes of the Doubs department
- Côte Feuillée stadium
- Immigration to Besançon

== Bibliography ==
- Hoffmann, Michael, Die französischen Konservativen in der katholischen Provinz Parteigenese und politische Kultur im Doubs (1900–1930) (Frankfurt am Main u.a., Peter Lang, 2008) (Moderne Geschichte und Politik, 22).
