= Arrondissements of the Doubs department =

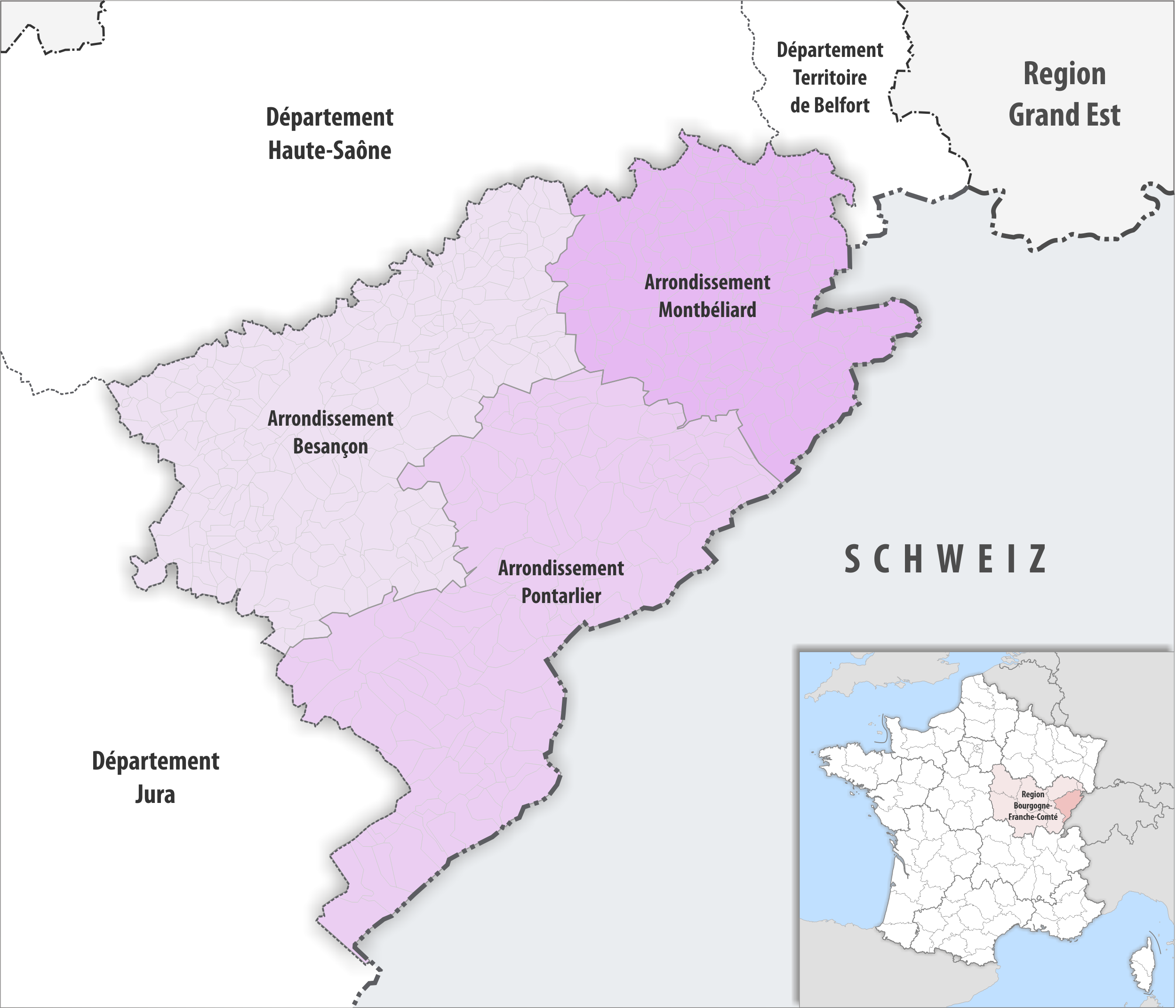
Map of arrondissements of the Doubs department.

The 3 arrondissements of the Doubs department are:

1. Arrondissement of Besançon, (prefecture of the Doubs department: Besançon) with 254 communes. The population of the arrondissement was 253,510 in 2021.
2. Arrondissement of Montbéliard, (subprefecture: Montbéliard) with 168 communes. The population of the arrondissement was 175,505 in 2021.
3. Arrondissement of Pontarlier, (subprefecture: Pontarlier) with 147 communes. The population of the arrondissement was 118,081 in 2021.

== History ==
In 1800, the arrondissements of Besançon, Baume-les-Dames, Pontarlier and Saint-Hippolyte were established. In 1816, Montbéliard replaced Saint-Hippolyte as subprefecture. The arrondissement of Baume-les-Dames was disbanded in 1926. The arrondissement of Pontarlier was expanded in January 2009 with the two cantons of Pierrefontaine-les-Varans and Vercel-Villedieu-le-Camp from the arrondissement of Besançon, and the canton of Le Russey from the arrondissement of Montbéliard.
