= Émile Peynaud =

French oenologist and researcher (1912–2004)

- Born: 29 June 1912; Madiran, Hautes-Pyrénées, France
- Died: 18 July 2004 (aged 92); Talence near Bordeaux, France
- Education: University of Bordeaux
- Occupation: Oenologist

Émile Peynaud (29 June 1912 – 18 July 2004) was a French oenologist and researcher who has been credited with revolutionizing winemaking in the latter half of the 20th century, and has been called "the forefather of modern oenology".

== Biography ==
Peynaud entered the wine trade at the age of fifteen with the négociant Maison Calvet. At Calvet he worked under the chemical engineer Jean Ribéreau-Gayon, and they developed methods of analysing the wines that were to be purchased. In 1946, Peynaud completed his Doctorate at the University of Bordeaux and joined its faculty as a lecturer. Ribéreau-Gayon at this time was also teaching at the university, and the two shifted their previous focus of problems faced by Calvet to the problems faced by the winemakers themselves.

While at the University of Bordeaux, where he became a professor of oenology, Peynaud worked at providing scientific explanations for many problems encountered in the process of winemaking. He convinced the wineries to begin picking grapes at vineyards up to two weeks later than usual, and to complete the picking as quickly as possible. The practice of also picking underripe or rotten grapes was abandoned, so that the selected fruit arriving at the winery was of the best possible quality.

Peynaud introduced crushing and fermenting fruit in separate batches based on vine age, vineyard location, or any other factor that resulted in fruit of differing qualities in order to control tannin extraction. He then applied the cool fermentations used in Champagne to still white Bordeaux in order to control fermentation temperatures.

Because he proposed methods that ran counter to many traditions, in the 1950s and 1960s, skeptics would use the term "Peynaudization" of Bordeaux, but as his advice usually produced superior wines, criticism came to an end.

Peynaud considered the control of malolactic fermentation to be one of his most important contributions to winemaking. It was commonly believed that malolactic fermentation was a sickness. He helped the wineries realize that they needed to encourage and control malolactic fermentation. He also stated, "Using only the very best grapes is a new phenomenon," considering this "the crowning achievement of [his] work."

Peynaud was the Decanter Man of the Year in 1990. He taught Michel Rolland and Patrick Léon.

== Selected bibliography ==
- Peynaud, Émile; J. Blouin (2005) [1971]. Connaissance Et Travail Du Vin (in French) (4th ed.). Dunod. ISBN 2-10-049296-9.
- Peynaud, Émile (1984). Knowing and Making Wine. trans. Alan Spenser. Wiley-Interscience. ISBN 0-471-11376-X.
- Peynaud, Émile; J. Blouin (1996) [1983]. Le goût du vin (in French). Paris: Dunod. ISBN 2-10-002750-6.
- Peynaud, Émile (1996). The Taste of Wine: The Art and Science of Wine Appreciation. Translated by Michael Schuster. London: Macdonald Orbis. ISBN 0-471-11376-X.

== See also ==
- List of wine personalities
