= Mont d'Or (Jura Mountains) =

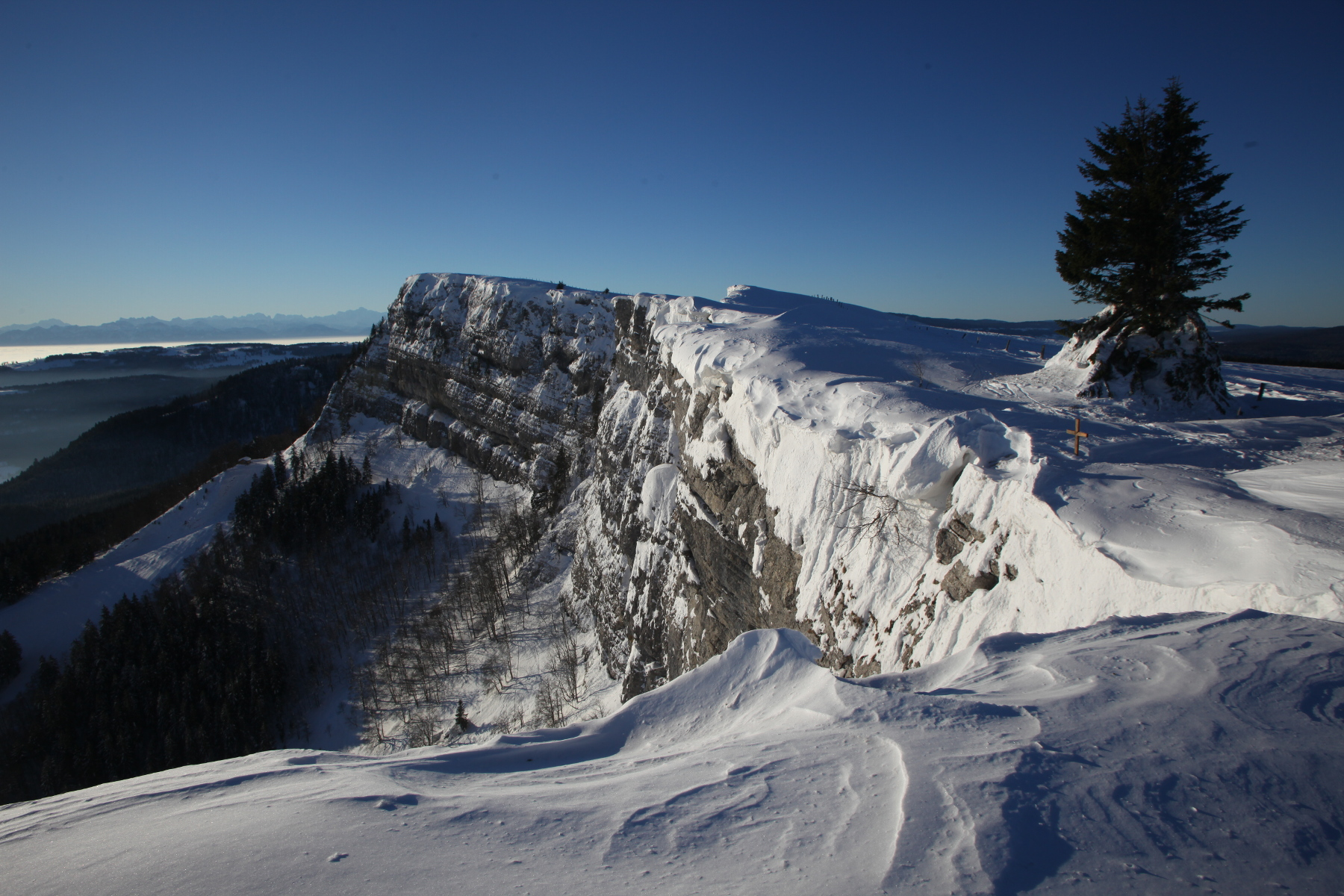
- View from the crest towards the south

Highest point
- Elevation: 1,463 m (4,800 ft)
- Prominence: 368 m (1,207 ft)
- Parent peak: Crêt de la Neige
- Isolation: 4.8 km (3.0 mi)
- Coordinates: 46°43′39″N 06°21′25″E

Geography
- Location within France
- Location: Doubs, France (mountain partially in Switzerland)
- Parent range: Jura Mountains

Mont d'Or (French: Le Mont d'Or) is a mountain of the Jura, located in the French department of Doubs and extending into the Swiss canton of Vaud. Its main summit is 1,463 metre-high and lies within France, 500 metres north of the border with Switzerland (1,380 m). The mountain is located between Jougne, France and Vallorbe, Switzerland.

Mont d'Or is notable for its limestone cirque on the east side. Near the highest point of the Swiss border is the Cabane du Mont d'Or, a mountain hut owned by the Swiss Alpine Club. In winter, Mont d'Or also includes a ski area within France. Several ski lifts are located on both west and east sides of the mountain.

== Gallery ==
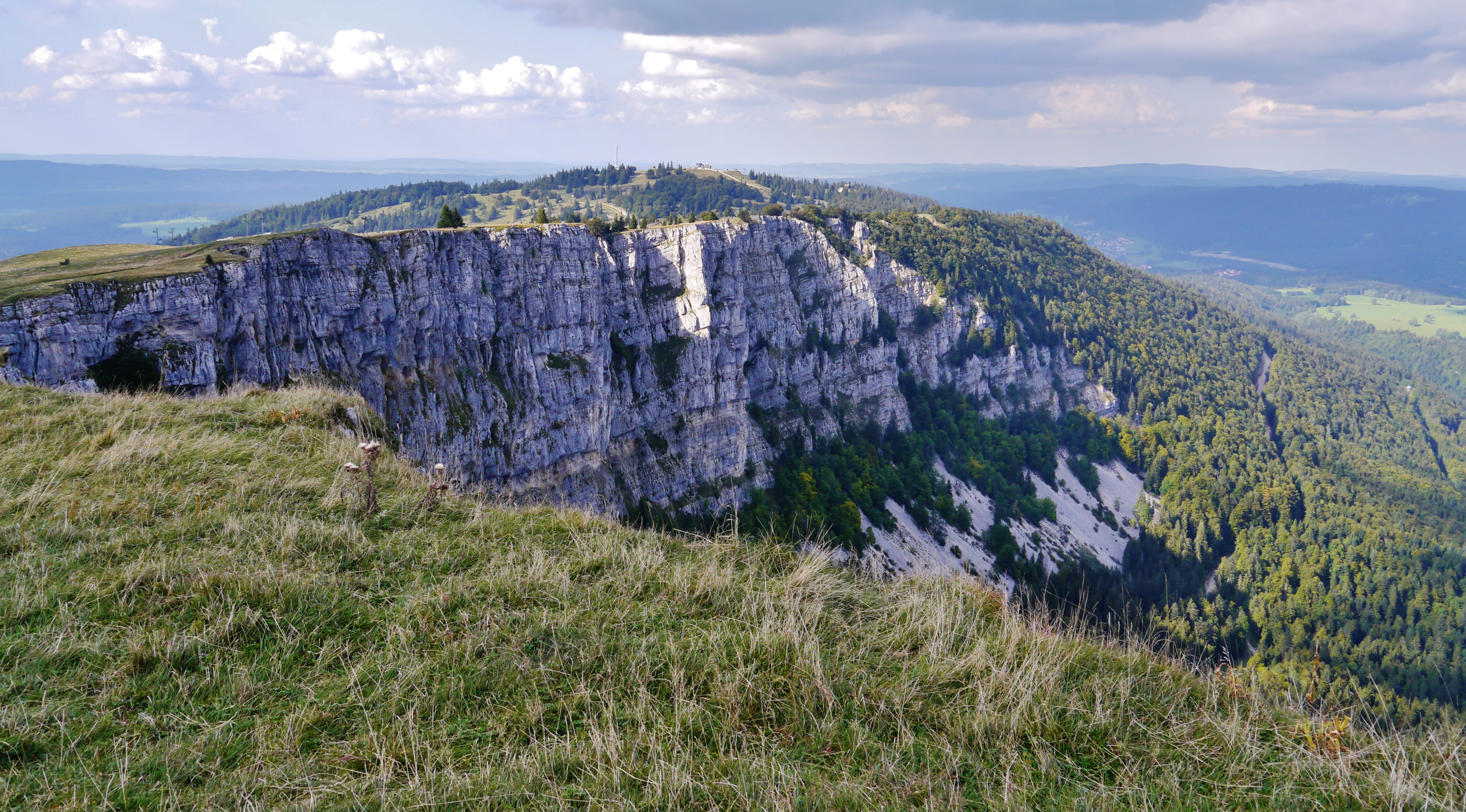

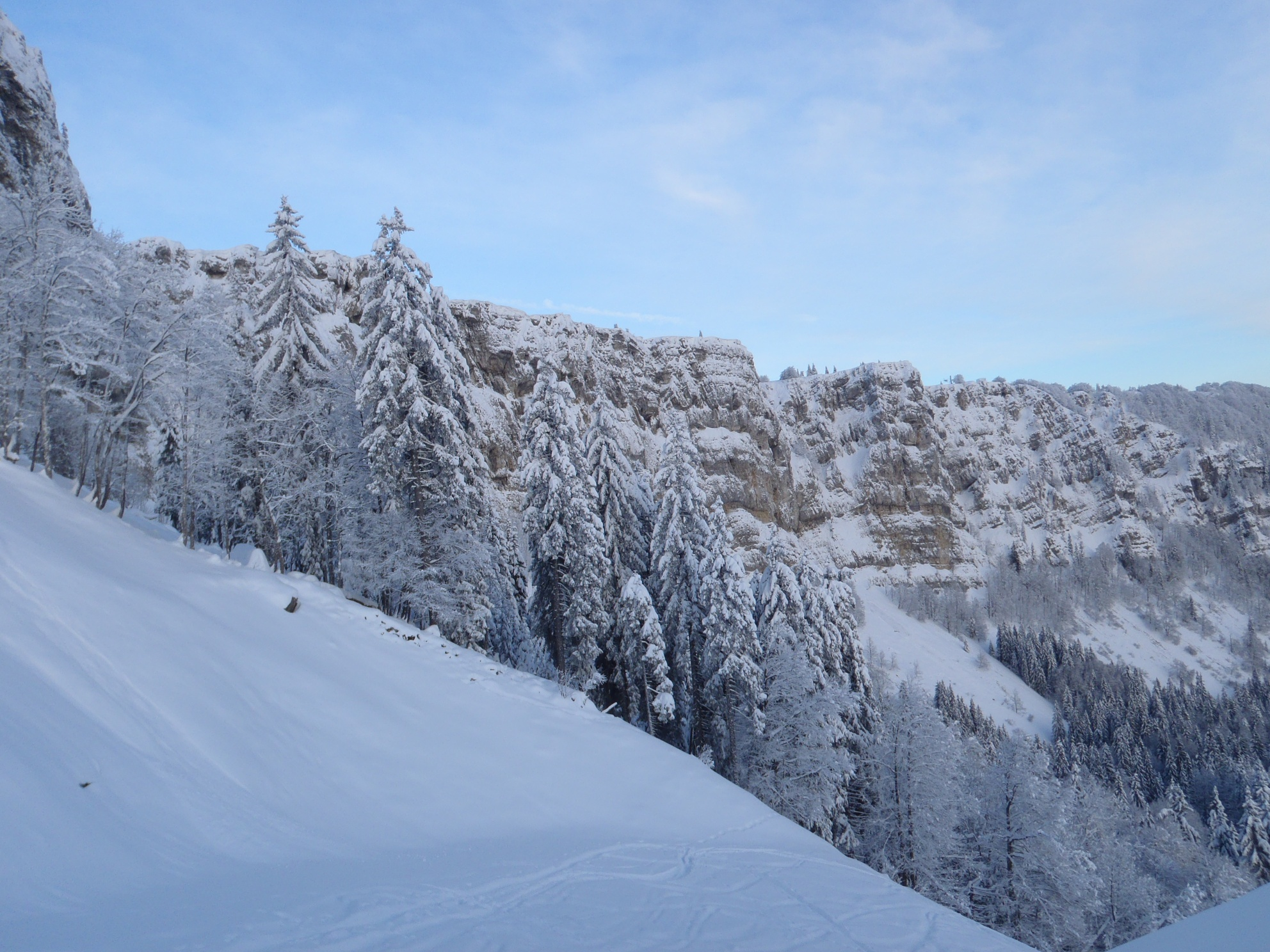
