= Folktable =

Restaurant in Sonoma, California, U.S.

- Location within California

Restaurant information
- Established: 2020
- Closed: 2024
- Owner: Casey Thompson
- Head chef: Melanie Wilkerson
- Food type: Farm-to-table
- Location: 23584 Arnold Drive, Sonoma, Sonoma County, California, 95476, United States
- Coordinates: 38.22740395°N 122.457518°W
- Website: folktablerestaurant.com

Folktable was a farm-to-table restaurant in Sonoma, California, United States.

Established at the Cornerstone Sonoma marketplace in December 2020, the restaurant's executive chef was Casey Thompson and its sous chef is Melanie Wilkerson, who previously worked with Thompson at The Inn at Rancho Santa Fe. The farmer for the restaurant is Christopher "Landy" Landercasper.

In September 2021, the restaurant was named a Michelin Guide Bib Gourmand establishment. It retained the accolade in 2022 and 2023.

The restaurant closed in 2024, after four years in business.
