= Officine Universelle Buly =

French beauty and cosmetics brand

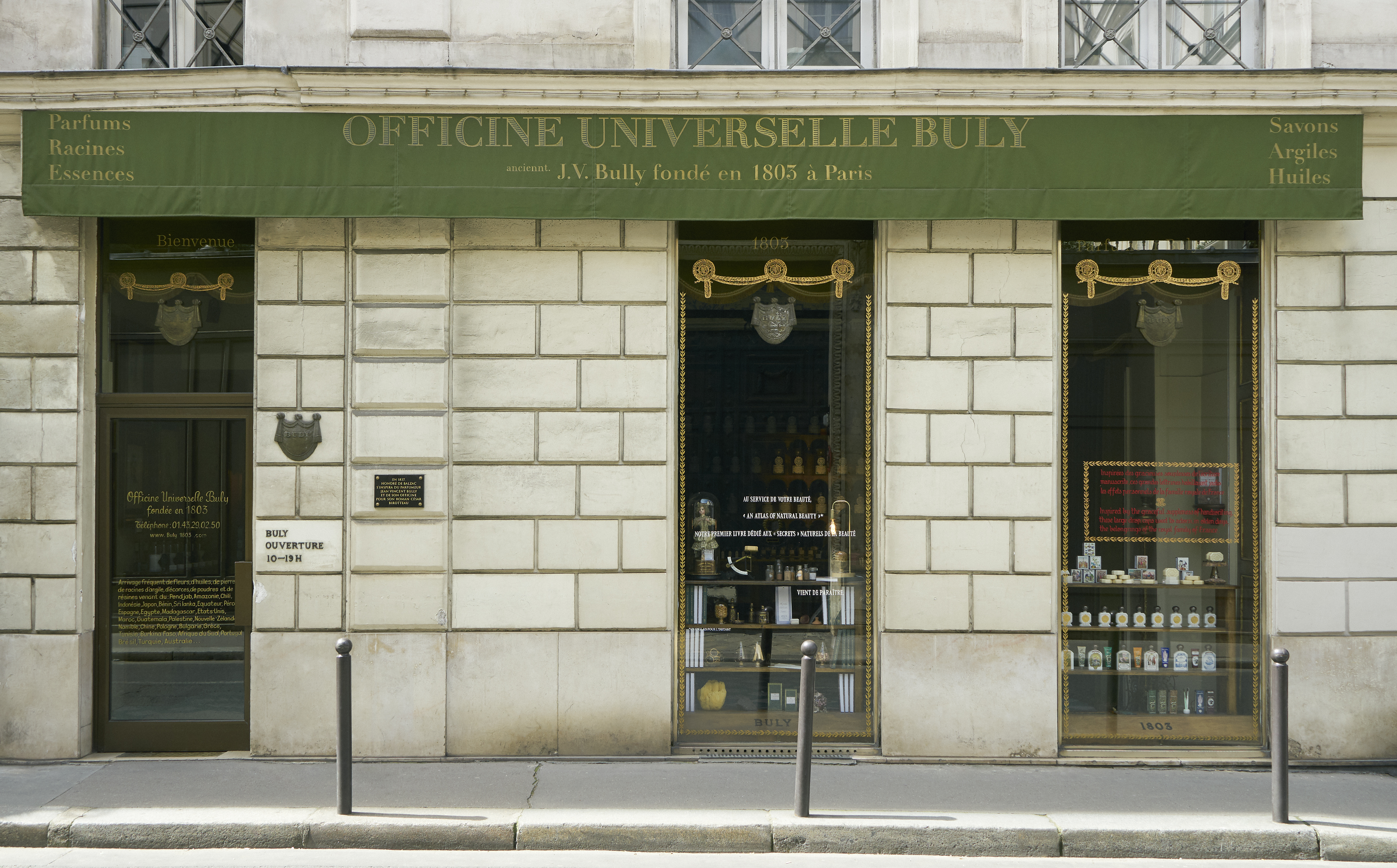
- Company type: Subsidiary
- Industry: Beauty
- Founded: 1803; 223 years ago
- Founders: Ramdane Touhami and Victoire de Taillac-Touhami
- Headquarters: 27-29 rue Guénégaud, 75006, Paris, France
- Number of locations: 59
- Key people: Nathalie Elbaz (CEO)
- Parent: LVMH
- Website: www.buly1803.com

Officine Universelle Buly 1803 is a French company formed in 2014 by Ramdane Touhami and Victoire de Taillac-Touhami. Entrepreneur Jean-Vincent Bully sold perfume products in the early 19th century on rue Saint-Honore in Paris, France.

This brand would then be reinvigorated by Touhami. It is headquartered in Paris, and has had more than 50 stores around the globe and counting, the brand sells perfumes, scented candles, soaps, plant oils, and other beauty products for body, face and hair, as well as accessories.

== Bully family and legacy ==
At the beginning of the 19th century, a distiller, perfumer and cosmetician named Claude Bully invented a vinaigre de toilette, a vinegar-based fragrance designed to fight body odours, cure disease, and nourish the skin, which later influenced the perfume industry and popular beauty-care sector.

His son, Jean-Vincent Bully, sought validation from doctors and scientists, bringing further recognition to the brand, and the vinegar-based product was granted two patents in 1809, and a second for a revised product in 1814. Bully showcased products at the 1823, 1827, and 1849 World's Fairs, and at the 1851 Great Exhibition in London, England.

Bully lost his shop due to a riot during a period of revolution, and then had to sell his business "for a trifling sum", after which the perfumer died in poverty.

The protagonist Cesar in the 1837 novel César Birotteau by Honoré de Balzac was influenced by Jean Bully, reflecting his fame during the 19th century.

In the summer of 1937, Le Figaro newspaper mentioned in its Beauty section: "Don't forget to buy a bottle of … Bully vinegar, the object of world renowned for nearly a century."

The product "Vinagre Aromatico Tipo de Bully" with the same formula concocted by Bully continued to exist in Latin America due to international licensing; the work of the Bully family had endured long after the end of Jean Bully's company, although outside the borders of France.

== Company history ==
Reinvigorated by Ramdane Touhami and Victoire de Taillac-Touhami, the brand was revived as "Officine Universelle Buly", or "Buly 1803" in 2014.

The first Buly shop was established in 2014, at 6 rue Bonaparte in Paris, and has seen a fast expansion around the world ever since. As of March 2021, Buly 1803 has 25 shops globally, in cities including Paris, Hong Kong, New York, San Francisco, London, Tokyo, Kyoto, Osaka, Seoul and Taipei.

== Business structure ==
Officine Universelle Buly was acquired by the multi-national LVMH in October 2021. The company is managed by Nathalie Elbaz as the CEO.

== Products ==
Officine Universelle Buly carries a wide range of beauty products for body, face, hair and home, with more than 800 variants amassed from around the world. Most of them bear a traditional French name honouring its commitment to old beauty recipes but combined with innovative cosmetic techniques, such as eau triple, the brand's water-based perfume, containing 0 alcohol.

== Collaboration ==
=== Louvre Museum ===
2019 has seen an unprecedented collaboration between the Louvre museum and Officine Universelle Buly, with eight perfumers each selecting eight art pieces as an inspiration for eight new fragrances, namely:

- "The Valpinçon Bather" by Daniela Andrier
- "Winged Victory of Samothrace" by Aliénor Massenet
- "Nymph with a Scorpion" by Annick Ménardo
- "Joseph the Carpenter2 by Sidonie Lancesseur
- "Venus de Milo" by Jean-Christophe Hérault
- "Grand Odalisque" by Domitille Michalon-Bertier;
- "The Lock" by Delphine Lebau；
- "Conversation in a Park" by Dorothée Piot.

Some of the scents are also available in candles, postcards, as well as soap sheets.
