= Sacha Lichine =

French Vintner

Alexis André Serge Lichine (born 1960 in Margaux) is a French winemaker and entrepreneur, best known as the creator of Whispering Angel rosé wine.

He is the second child of Alexis Lichine and Gisèle Edenbourgh. He was educated at the Lycée Français de New York, and dropped out of Boston University. After his father's death in 1989, he took over the family business. He sold the family stake in Château Lascombes. He ran Château Prieuré-Lichine until 1999, when he sold it to Groupe Ballande for $28.8 million, some of which was used to pay off debts. In 2006 he bought Château d'Esclans in Provence for €13 million, investing a total of €35 million. In 2019, LVMH bought a majority stake in Château d'Esclans for an undisclosed amount, estimated at €140 million. They bought 5% from Lichine, and 50% from Alix AM PTE Limited, previously controlled by his business partner Hervé Vinciguerra.

Lichine is married to Mathilde and has five children.
