= Cantons of the Doubs department =

The following is a list of the 19 cantons of the Doubs department, in France, following the French canton reorganisation which came into effect in March 2015:

- Audincourt
- Baume-les-Dames
- Bavans
- Besançon-1
- Besançon-2
- Besançon-3
- Besançon-4
- Besançon-5
- Besançon-6
- Bethoncourt
- Frasne
- Maîche
- Montbéliard
- Morteau
- Ornans
- Pontarlier
- Saint-Vit
- Valdahon
- Valentigney
