= Château d'Esclans =

Rosé wine producer in Provence, France

Château d'Esclans is a rosé wine producer in the Côtes de Provence AOC in Provence, France. It is majority owned by LVMH.

The château is credited with reviving interest in rosé wine. It is best known for producing the Whispering Angel, which is in high demand in the US.

== History ==
Whispering Angel bar at the BA Lounge, Heathrow Terminal 3

Château d'Esclans was formerly a residence of the Counts of Provence. It was later owned by Jacques Auxile Verrion, War Commissioner of Louis XV, who became Count of Esclans under Charles X.

Sacha Lichine purchased Château d'Esclans in 2005, from a Swedish pension fund. Over ten years, he increased production from 135,000 bottles per year to 5 million bottles per year. Lichine targeted the North American market, transforming rosé wine as a lifestyle accessory. He brought in Patrick Léon as winemaker, who had retired from Mouton Rothschild.

In 2019, LVMH acquired 55% of Château d'Esclans: 50% from Lichine's business partner Hervé Vinciguerra, and 5% from Lichine, with Lichine retaining 45% of the business. The value of the deal was not disclosed but was estimated at €140 million.

== Products ==
The main wine of the estate is "Whispering Angel". The lesser wines are "The Pale" and "The Beach". "Rock Angel" is more expensive. These wines are made with grapes bought in from other estates. More expensive wines are made with grapes only from the estate: "Château d'Esclans", "Les Clans" and "Garrus". "Garrus" is one of the world's most expensive rosés, made from almost 100-year-old vines and fermented in French oak barrels.
