= César Birotteau =

1837 novel by Honoré de Balzac

Cesar Birotteau
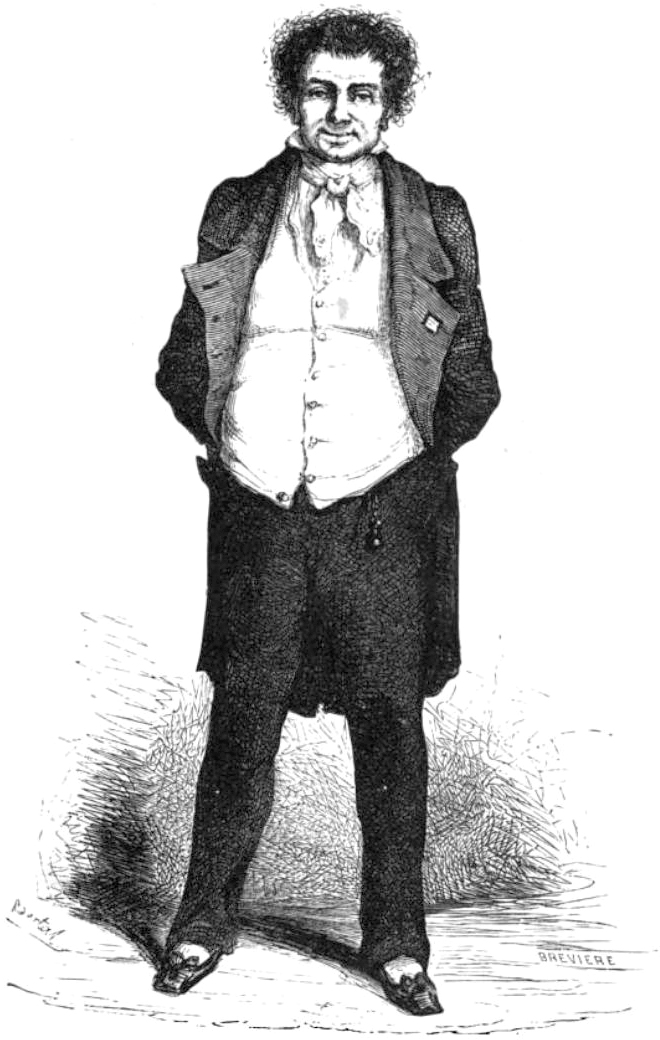
- Image from Cesar Birotteau
- Author: Honoré de Balzac
- Illustrator: Bertall
- Language: French
- Series: La Comédie humaine
- Genre: Fiction
- Publisher: Charles-Béchet
- Publication date: 1837
- Publication place: France
- Media type: Print

Histoire de la grandeur et de la décadence de César Birotteau or César Birotteau, is an 1837 novel by Honoré de Balzac, and is one of the Scènes de la vie parisienne in the series La Comédie humaine. Its main character is a Parisian perfumer, with the prototype being a legendary perfumer, Jean Vincent Bully, who achieves success in the cosmetics business, but becomes bankrupt due to property speculation.

== Writing and Publication ==
Balzac kept a rough draft of the novel for six years before completing it in 1837 after being offered 20,000 Francs by Le Figaro, provided it was ready to appear before December 15 that year. Explaining the delay he would later write "For six years I have kept a rough draft of César Birotteau despairing of ever being able to interest anyone in the character of a rather stupid, somewhat mediocre shopkeeper, whose misfortunes are commonplace, symbolising that world of the small Parisian tradesman which we so often ridicule ...".

During its serialization, Le Figaro interwove the fictional advertisements written by the novel's protagonist with real advertisements for hair treatments, causing a great boom in business for Paris' perfumers.

== Plot summary ==
César is a man of peasant origins from the Touraine region. At the start of the novel, in 1819, he owns a successful perfume shop, La Reine des Roses, he has been elected deputy mayor of his arrondissement in Paris, and he has been awarded the Legion of Honour. During the revolution he took part in the Royalist 13 Vendémiaire uprising against the Republic, at one stage confronting Napoleon Bonaparte himself, and he mentions this often in conversation. He is married to Constance and has a daughter Cesarine. He plans to throw a ball at his home, and make renovations to his home for the ball. He becomes involved in property speculation with borrowed money, through his notary Roguin. He plans to expand his business with a new hair oil product, with his assistant Anselme Popinot (who is in love with Cesarine) as his business partner. All of these plans have caused him to run up large debts.

What he does not realise is that Roguin has money problems of his own, and that César's former shop assistant Ferdinand du Tillet, now a banker, is manipulating Roguin in order to have revenge against César. His financial situation becomes a crisis when Roguin absconds and leaves César with debts that he is not able to pay. His attempts to get financial assistance from various bankers such as Nucingen, the Keller brothers and Gigonnet (all recurring characters in La Comédie humaine) fail, since all are friends of du Tillet and acting on his instructions. This leads him to declare bankruptcy, sell La Reine des Roses to his assistant Celestin Crevel and retire from business.

Eventually César pays off all of his debts when his business venture with Popinot succeeds. He then dies suddenly, but happy that his honour has been restored.

== Themes ==
The novel is a partly satirical, partly sympathetic portrayal of the Parisian middle class. Balzac writes "..may the present history be the poem of those vicissitudes of bourgeois life that no voice has thought to sing, so much are they denuded of grandeur, though by the same token immense: what we speak of here is not a single man, but a whole nation of suffering."

The world of high finance is also explored through César's visits to the bankers du Tillet, the Kellers, Nucingen and Gigonnet during the second half of the book. Chapter 14 is titled "A General History of Bankruptcy", and here Balzac explains the bankruptcy laws as they existed in his time, and how they were frequently abused by dishonest businessmen who wanted to escape their debts. César is shown to be an exception in that he chooses to honour all of his debts. According to literary critic, George Saintsbury the novel has been nicknamed Balzac on Bankruptcy.

== Bibliography ==
- Balzac, Honoré de. Histoire de la grandeur et de la décadence de César Birotteau. 1837.
- Buss, Robin. "Introduction". Cesar Birotteau. 1837. Penguin Classics, 1994.
- Young, Paul J. "Je fus blessé par Napoléon: César Birotteau's Ambiguous Claim to Fame", Dix-Neuf, 2019, DOI: 10.1080/14787318.2019.1624013.
