= Satoshi Kuwata =

Japanese fashion designer

- Born: 1983 (age 42–43); Kyoto, Japan
- Education: Central Saint Martins
- Occupation: Fashion designer
- Known for: Founder and creative director of Setchu
- Awards: LVMH Prize (2023)

Satoshi Kuwata (born 1983 in Kyoto) is a Japanese fashion designer. In 2023, he was awarded the LVMH Prize for his work. He is based in Milan where he founded Setchu in 2020, a fashion brand that is inspired by Japanese and British fashion. He holds the position of creative director at his design firm Setchu.

Kuwata trained at Central Saint Martins in London and as a tailor's apprentice on Savile Row, and worked for Gareth Pugh, Edun, Givenchy and Golden Goose before founding Setchu in Milan in 2020. The label's name is taken from the Japanese phrase wayo setchu, which refers to a compromise between Japanese and Western styles. Setchu won the Italian emerging-designer competition Who Is On Next? in 2022 and the LVMH Prize the following year. Kuwata staged his first runway show as guest designer of Pitti Uomo in January 2025 and has since shown on the Milan Fashion Week men's schedule.

== Early life and education ==
Kuwata was born in Kyoto, Japan in 1983. At the age of 21 he moved to London. He studied at Central Saint Martins before apprenticing on Savile Row.

He has said that he decided on a career in design as a child and worked at a department store in Japan before applying to Central Saint Martins, paying for the move to London himself. He arrived from Yawata, near Kyoto, with almost no English, and looked for work along Savile Row before being taken on by the tailoring house H. Huntsman & Sons. He later lived in New York City and Paris before settling in Milan.

== Career ==
=== Early career ===
Kuwata trained as a tailor's apprentice at H. Huntsman & Sons on Savile Row while he was studying at Central Saint Martins. Prior to founding Setchu, he worked for Gareth Pugh and Givenchy, where he was part of the studio under Riccardo Tisci. He also worked in New York City for Edun, the label founded by Bono and Ali Hewson, collaborated in Paris with Kanye West, and was based in Milan at the sportswear company Golden Goose before starting his own label.

=== Setchu ===
Kuwata founded Setchu in Milan in 2020. He had returned to the city shortly before the COVID-19 pandemic confined him to his apartment, where he continued to drape and rework the collection; the resulting suit became the label's first product. The name is taken from the Japanese phrase wayo setchu, used to describe a compromise or fusion of Japanese and Western styles.

In July 2022 Setchu won first prize at the twelfth edition of Who Is On Next?, a competition for emerging designers held as part of Altaroma in Rome. The following year Kuwata was one of nine finalists for the LVMH Prize, and was named the winner on June 7, 2023, at a ceremony at the Fondation Louis Vuitton in Paris. The prize brought a grant of €400,000 and a year of mentoring from LVMH executives; the group had raised the main grant from €300,000 for the award's tenth edition, and Setchu was in its fifth season when it won. Delphine Arnault, who oversees the prize, said the jury's decision had been close to unanimous. Kuwata also received a grant from the Camera Nazionale della Moda Italiana's Fashion Trust in 2023, and in 2024 Fashion Asia Hong Kong included Setchu among its ten Asian Designers to Watch.

=== Runway shows and collaborations ===
In 2024 Kuwata worked with the Savile Row tailors Davies & Son on a small group of bespoke garments, presented in Venice in April of that year during the 60th Venice Biennale. According to 10 Magazine, it was the first time the firm had co-designed a collection with a designer from outside the house.

Setchu was guest designer at the 107th edition of Pitti Uomo in Florence in January 2025, where Kuwata staged the label's first runway show. He followed it in June 2025 with a show at Galleria Ordet during Milan Fashion Week Men's, presenting a spring/summer 2026 collection that grew out of a fishing trip to Victoria Falls in Zimbabwe; woven pieces were made with Batoka artisans in a partnership supported by LVMH Métiers d'Art. In July 2025 Pitti Immagine announced that Kuwata would be the special guest of that September's Pitti Fragranze in Florence, where he would introduce Setchu Perfume, a set of five fragrances developed with the perfumer Julie Massé.

Kuwata presented his autumn/winter 2026 collection in January 2026 in Setchu's new Milan studio, taking the landscape and clothing of Greenland as its starting point; it was his third runway show and his second on the Milan men's schedule. In March 2026 the French outdoor brand Aigle announced that Kuwata would act as artistic director of a capsule collection, Aigle by Setchu, to be unveiled in September 2026.

== Design and materials ==
His work incorporates convertible clothing such as bags that transform into skirts and coats that can become capes; as well as complex folded garments similar to origami forms. Two of his material innovations include the use of sugarcane waste to create a denim like fabric and inventing a type of washable cashmere wool, both of which are practical and sustainable.

Kuwata begins a design with paper, folding and cutting it to test three-dimensional shapes before moving to fabric on a mannequin, and describes himself as a tailor rather than a designer. Setchu's materials have included a "paper denim" combining cotton with Japanese washi paper, alongside Italian cashmere, leather and silk. He has named Issey Miyake and John Galliano among his influences, along with earlier technical innovators such as Mariano Fortuny and Madeleine Vionnet.
