= Cire Trudon =

French candlemaker

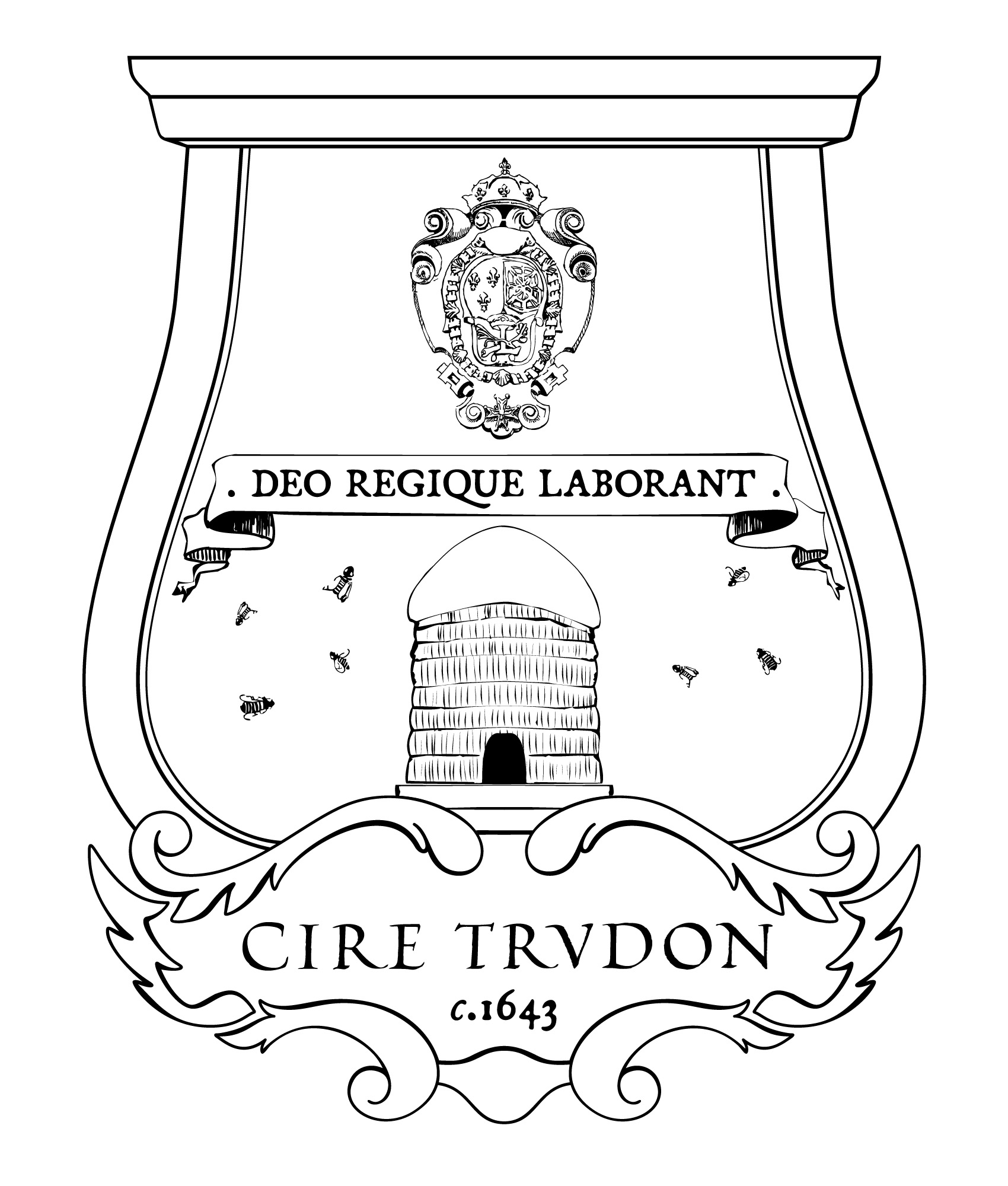
Arms of Cire Trudon

Cire Trudon is a luxury French candlemaker and fragrance brand. The headquarters are located at 78 rue de Seine in the 6th arrondissement of Paris. Founded in 1643, it was the provider of the royal court of Louis XIV, the Sun King, as well as most of the great churches of France.

Cire Trudon was the largest wax-producer in the French Kingdom during the 17th and 18th centuries. In 1762, in his encyclopaedia The art of the wax producer, engineer Duhamel du Monceau, praises the skills of the Trudons and gives the manufacture as an example. Such a level of quality led to King Louis XIV elevating Charles Trudon to the French nobility as Count Trudon des Ormes.

== History ==
=== Claude Trudon ===
In 1643, a salesman named Claude Trudon arrived in Paris. He soon became the owner of a shop on Saint-Honoré, which provided its customers with wax, candles for any domestic usage as well as church candles to the neighbouring Saint Roch parish. The candles were homemade, developing and building on a specific manufacturing process. On the eve of the reign of Louis XIV, M. Trudon established his first family-owned factory which was to bear his name and make the fortune of his heirs.

=== Jacques Trudon ===
Claude's son Jacques took over, becoming a grocer and wax producer and joined the Versailles royal court in 1687 as the apothecary and distiller of Queen Marie-Thérèse.

At the time, wax was under high scrutiny. Carefully collected on the hive, it was bleached through a series of pure water baths that washed off all the impurities. Dried in the open air, the wax was whitened by sunlight. When burning, the flame lit the translucent edges generating the glowing aura of the candle.

=== Jérôme Trudon ===
In 1737, Jérôme Trudon, heir of the family, purchased one of the most famous wax producing factories of the times that belonged to Lord Pean de Saint Gilles. Pean de Saint Gilles was then the official wax provider to the King. Drawing from the family expertise, Hierosme devoted his skills to the development of a vast factory. Skilful and very demanding, he produced a wax of very high quality, collecting it from the best hives of the kingdom and trading directly with the producers. The wax was then treated with the utmost attention: it was washed with the purest water after being filtered with gypsum, guaranteeing the highest quality. The factory also imported the finest cotton to manufacture wicks whose combustion was clean and regular. The Trudon candles, so white and so perfect, could burn for hours without crackling; their flame neither trembled nor smoked.

Maison Trudon furnished candles to the royal court, and cathedrals and churches over France. More than one hundred people worked at the time in a very large building – now registered in the French inventory of historical monuments – in the city of Antony, Hauts-de-Seine. Its Latin motto and its blazon are engraved on a stone board of the factory building: a depiction of hives and bees bordered by the saying: Deo regique laborant ("they work for God and for the King" — they meaning the bees).

== Cire Trudon today ==
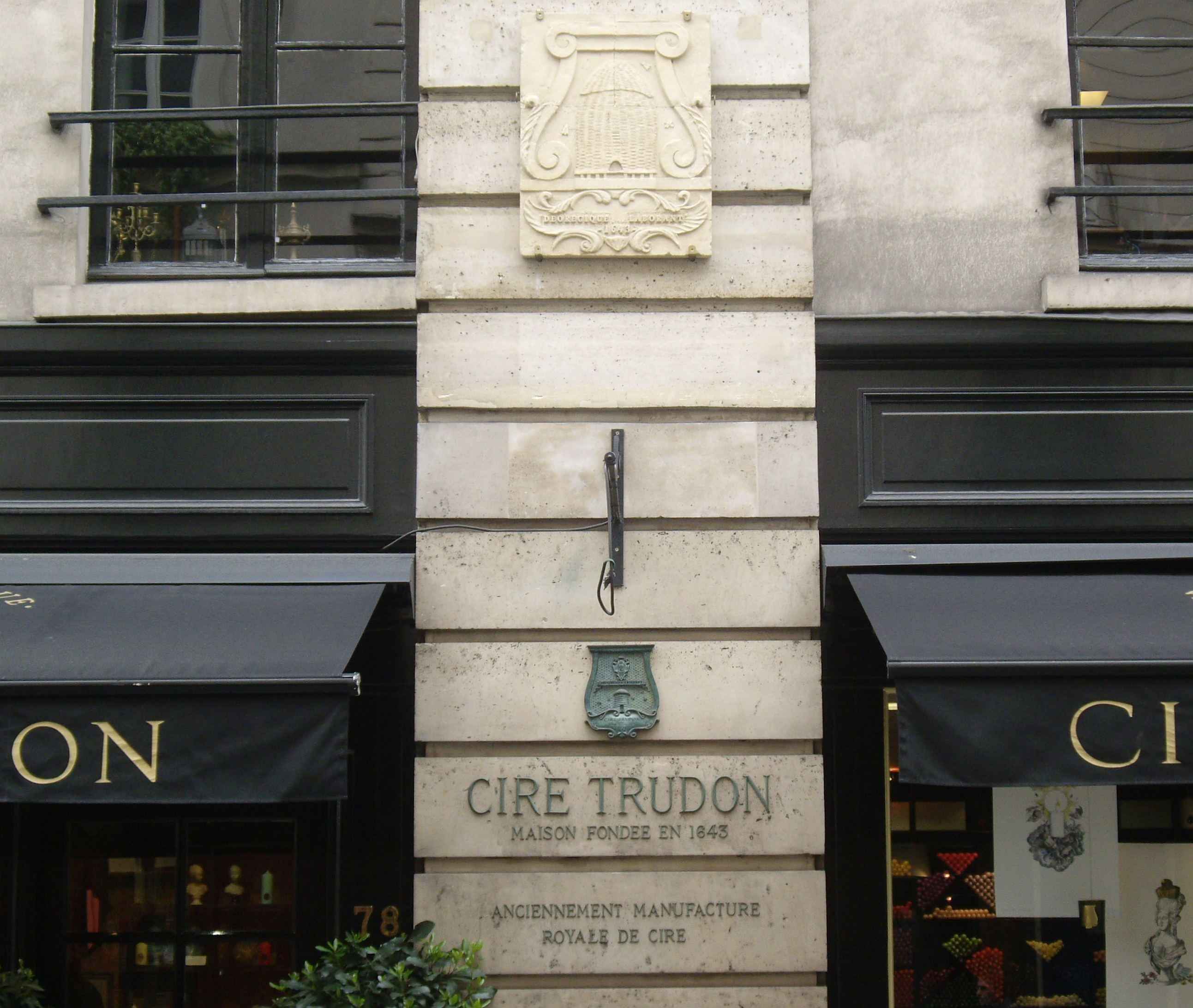
The headquarters of Cire Trudon in Paris

Cire Trudon still keep records of recipe and tools of wax whitening: wrought iron, 17th century pans. The moulds used to form candles bearing the royal blazons still remain: "cierge pascal pour la Chapelle du Roy à Versailles, Bougies de nuit pour le Roy..." ("Easter candle church for the Royal Chapel in Versailles, night candle for the King...")

Cire Trudon supplied the Versailles castle until the end of the monarchy. During his captivity, Louis XVI used the candles of his royal wax manufacturer. The blazon and the motto would be hidden under a layer of mortar to avoid the furies of the Revolution.

It is still today the candle provider of many churches, including Saint-Roch in Paris, which has burned their candles since 1643.

Trudon distributes its products in France and abroad.

== Sources ==
- Trudon in the Encyclopedia "Bibliothèque des sciences, et des beaux arts" (1754)
- Trudon in the book "Napoléon et son fils" (1929)
