= Paul-Claude Racamier =

French psychiatrist and psychoanalyst

Paul-Claude Racamier (French: [ʁakamje]; 20 May 1924 – 18 August 1996) was a French psychiatrist and psychoanalyst, born in Doubs.

== Selected works ==
- Racamier, Paul‐Claude (February 2014). "On narcissistic perversion". The International Journal of Psychoanalysis. 95 (1). Translated by Slotkin, Philip: 119–132. doi:10.1111/1745-8315.12111. Full access available to users of The Wikipedia Library.
