= Terrazas de los Andes =

Winery in Argentina

- Location: Argentina
- Wine region: Mendoza
- Founded: 1996
- Parent company: Moët & Hennessy wine division
- Varietals: Malbec, Cabernet Sauvignon, Chardonnay, Torrontés
- Website: www.terrazasdelosandes.com

Terrazas de los Andes (Spanish for "Terraces of the Andes") is a winery located in Luján de Cuyo in the province of Mendoza, Argentina.

Terrazas de los Andes was founded in 1996 as a Moët-Hennessy subsidiary in Argentina, refurbishing an old winery built in 1898. It has 8 vineyards planted on terraces at various altitude on the eastern foothills of the Andes, between 980m and 1250 above sea level. Each grape variety is planted at a specific altitude, matching with a specific climatic condition for optimal growing and ripening. Precision viticulture techniques (such as soils analysis, electro-conductivity mapping) have been implemented in the recent years in order to boost the quality and the performance of the grapes varieties.

Terrazas de los Andes produces primarily Malbec wines as well as Cabernet-Sauvignon, Chardonnay, Torrontés which production is located in Cafayate (Salta province). Two vineyards - planted in 1929 and 1945, the oldest among the entire estate - are dedicated to the production of limited edition "Single Vineyard" and "Parcels" Malbec.

In 1999, Terrazas de los Andes partnered with Château Cheval Blanc to elaborate Cheval des Andes, a premium Bordeaux-style blend of Malbec and Cabernet-Sauvignon.
