= Dean Fearing =

American chef

William Dean Fearing
- Born: 1955 (age 70–71); Kentucky, U.S.

William Dean Fearing (born 1955) is an American chef known as one of the earliest stars of Southwestern Cuisine.

== Career ==
Dean Fearing was executive chef for 20 years at Dallas' The Mansion on Turtle Creek, leaving in 2007 to start his own restaurant, Fearing's, in partnership with Ritz-Carlton. He is the host of a national television show, Entertaining at Home with Dean Fearing, airing on Food Network, and author of three cookbooks, Mansion on Turtle Creek Cookbook, Dean Fearing's Southwest Cuisine: Blending Asia and the Americas and The Texas Food Bible: From Legendary Dishes to New Classics. In 2008, the Zagat guide gave Fearing's the top spot on its list of the best in hotel dining, simultaneously announcing the Dallas Ritz-Carlton as the U.S.' best large hotel.

== Television ==
Fearing made several appearances in the acclaimed PBS series "Great Chefs" which aired in the early to mid 1980s. He made his debut in Episode #2 of "Great Chefs of the West" preparing an appetizer of Warm Lobster Tacos with Yellow Salsa and Jicama Salad. Fearing was featured again in Episode #11 offering up an entree of California Free Range Chicken with Tobacco Onions. His final appearance in the "West" series (Episode #23) focused on his dessert classic, Maple Pecan and Sweet Potato Pie. According to their website, "Great Chefs of the West was at the forefront of the new Southwestern cuisine trend." Chef Dean also made several appearances in their "Great Chefs, Great Cities" series. In Episode #21 his meticulous attention to detail came to light in his appetizer offering of Deviled Oysters with Sour Mango Salsa and Tabasco Butter. In Episode #45 Fearing once again displayed his versatility in showcasing a masterpiece entree of Bacon Wrapped Scallops on Barbequed Duck with Sweet Corn Sauce. In the very last episode of the "Cities" series (Episode #80) Chef Fearing put his exclamation point on his Southwestern Cuisine with his offering of a Baked Potato Enchilada on Pico de Gallo with Ancho Ranchero Sauce and a Mexican Tortilla Salad.

Many of the young up and coming chefs that appeared in the "Great Chefs" series became household names, including Chef Dean Fearing.

Fearing is a guitarist and started to play with friend and fellow chef Robert Del Grande. The two would perform as they were promoting their Southwest Cuisine.
