= LVMH =

French multinational luxury goods conglomerate

LVMH Moët Hennessy Louis Vuitton SE

- Headquarters in Paris, France
- Trade name: LVMH
- Formerly: LVMH Moët Hennessy Louis Vuitton SA (1987–2015)
- Type: Public company
- Traded as: Euronext Paris: MC; CAC 40 component
- ISIN: FR0000121014
- Industry: Luxury goods
- Predecessors: Moët & Chandon; Hennessy; Louis Vuitton
- Founded: 3 June 1987; 39 years ago
- Founders: Alain Chevalier; Henry Racamier
- Headquarters: 22 Avenue Montaigne; Paris, France
- Number of locations: ▼6,280 stores (2025)
- Area served: Worldwide, with a chief focus on the markets of France, Japan and the United States
- Key people: Bernard Arnault (chairman and CEO); Stéphane Bianchi (Group managing director); Antoine Arnault (Director; CEO of Christian Dior SE); Delphine Arnault (Director; CEO of Christian Dior Couture)
- Products: Clothing; cosmetics; fashion accessories; jewelry; perfumes; spirits; watches; wines
- Services: Department stores
- Revenue: ▼€80.807 billion (2025)
- Operating income: ▼€17.099 billion (2025)
- Net income: ▼€10.878 billion (2025)
- Total assets: ▼€142,037 billion (2025)
- Total equity: ▼€68.949 billion (2025)
- Owners: Arnault family (49.77% of shares, 65.89% of votes); Public float (50.23% of shares, 34.11% of votes)
- Number of employees: 211,552 (2025)
- Subsidiaries: List of subsidiaries
- Website: lvmh.com
- Footnotes; Financials as of December 31, 2025. References

LVMH Moet Hennessy Louis Vuitton SE (Note: French: [mɔɛt ɛnɛsi lwi vɥitɔ̃]) is a French multinational holding company and conglomerate that specializes in luxury goods and has its headquarters in Paris. The company was formed in 1987 through the merger of fashion house Louis Vuitton (founded in 1854) with Moët Hennessy, which had been established by the 1971 merger between the champagne producer Moët & Chandon (founded in 1743) and the cognac producer Hennessy (founded in 1765). In April 2023, LVMH became the first European company to surpass a valuation of $500 billion. In 2023, the company was ranked 47th in the Forbes Global 2000.

LVMH controls around 60 subsidiaries that manage 75 luxury brands and is extremely popular in France, Japan and the United States. In addition to Louis Vuitton and Moët Hennessy, LVMH's portfolio includes Christian Dior SE, Givenchy, Fendi, Celine, Kenzo, Tiffany & Co., Bulgari, Loewe, TAG Heuer, Sephora and Loro Piana. The subsidiaries are often managed independently, under the umbrellas of six branches: Fashion Group, Wines and Spirits, Perfumes and Cosmetics, Watches and Jewelry, Selective Distribution, and Other Activities. LVMH owns Les Echos-Le Parisien Group, its media subsidiary. The wine estate of Château d'Yquem, whose origins date back to 1593, is under LVMH ownership. Bernard Arnault is the chairman, CEO and largest shareholder of LVMH, making him one of the richest people in the world as of 2026. Chief markets for LVMH include France, Japan and the United States.

== History ==
In 1987, Moët Hennessy and Louis Vuitton merged to create LVMH. As a result of different visions for the future of the merged entity, Alain Chevalier and Henry Racamier, the respective leaders of the predecessor firms, started to fight. Racamier invited Bernard Arnault to invest in LVMH. Rapidly, Arnault succeeded in taking control of LVMH at the expense of the initial family owners. Contrary to what is often indicated, Arnault did not establish LVMH.

LVMH is a component of the Euro Stoxx 50 stock market index.

Make Up For Ever was established in 1984, and it was acquired by LVMH in 1999.

On 7 March 2011, LVMH announced the acquisition of the 50.4% family-owned shares of the Italian jeweller Bulgari and the intention to make a tender offer for the rest, which was publicly owned. The transaction was about $5.2 billion.

By 2012, LVMH established LCapitalAsia, a continuation of its private-equity arm, focused on Asia. In early 2013, LVMH announced its co-investment of its private equity arm LCapitalAsia and the Chinese apparel company Xin Hee Co., Ltd.

In February 2014, LVMH entered into a joint venture with the Italian fashion brand Marco De Vincenzo, taking a minority 45% stake in the firm.

In 2016, L Catterton Asia and Crescent Point, two private equity firms backed by LVMH, bought a majority stake in GXG.

In April 2017, LVMH announced it would gain ownership of Christian Dior haute couture, leather, men's and women's ready-to-wear, and footwear lines to integrate the entire Dior brand within its luxury group.

In January 2018, LVMH announced record sales of 42.6 billion euros in 2017, up 13% over the previous year, as all divisions turned in strong performances. In the same year, the net profit increased by 29%. On 1 November 2018, co-founder Alain Chevalier died at age 87.

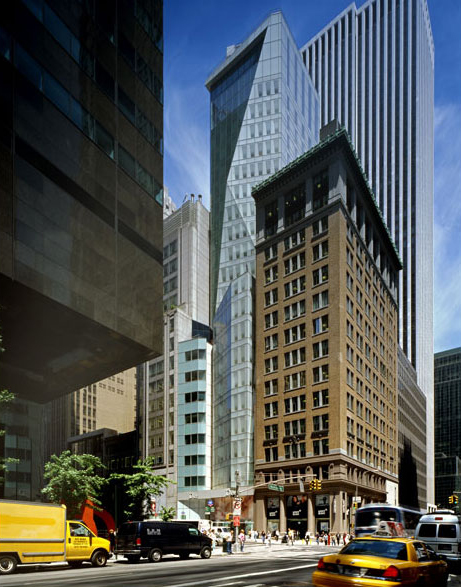
The LVMH Tower in Midtown Manhattan, with its bluish, gem-shaped, angulated glass facade

On 12 May 2019, the fashion house Fenty, created by Barbadian singer Rihanna, was launched by LVMH in Paris. It is the first new fashion house by LVMH in 32 years, and she is the first woman of colour to head a brand under LVMH. On 15 July 2019, LVMH announced a new partnership to further develop the Stella McCartney House. On 29 November 2019, LVMH announced its 55% stake in Château d'Esclans, the producer best known for the brand Whispering Angel. The acquisition was part of LVMH's move to offer a beloved high-end rosé portfolio, in addition to reaching customers worldwide. In November 2019, LVMH expressed plans to acquire Tiffany & Co. for approximately US$16.2 billion. The deal was expected to close by June 2020. LVMH issued a statement in September 2020 indicating that the takeover would not proceed and that the deal was "invalid," citing Tiffany's mismanagement during the COVID-19 pandemic. Subsequently, Tiffany filed suit against LVMH, asking the court to compel the purchase or to assess damages against the defendant; LVMH planned to countersuit, alleging that mismanagement had invalidated the purchase agreement.

In mid-September 2020, a reliable source told Forbes that the reason for Arnault's decision to cancel the Tiffany purchase was purely financial: because Tiffany was paying millions in dividends to shareholders despite a financial loss of US$32 million during the pandemic. Some US$70 million had already been paid out by Tiffany, with an additional US$70 million scheduled to be paid in November 2020. LVMH filed a counterclaim against the court action commenced by Tiffany; a statement issued by LVMH blamed Tiffany's mismanagement during the pandemic and claimed that it was "burning cash and reporting losses". In late October 2020, Tiffany and LVMH agreed to go back to the original takeover plan, though at a slightly reduced price of nearly $16 billion, a minor reduction of 2.6% from the aforementioned deal. The new deal reduced the amount paid per share by LVMH from the original price of $135 to $131.50. As of late 2020, LVMH has the largest market capitalization of any company in France, and also in the Eurozone with a record of 261 billion euros ($317.6 billion). As of December 2020, Arnault's own fortune was nearly half that, with a personal net worth of $151.7 billion.

LVMH completed the purchase of Tiffany in January 2021. In 2021, with a valuation of $329 billion, LVMH became the most valuable company in Europe.

In January 2022, LVMH acquired a minority stake in the New York-based label Aimé Leon Dore for an undisclosed sum. The investment was made through the conglomerate's LVMH Luxury Ventures arm. In March 2022, LVMH announced the closure of its 120+ stores in Russia, pointing to "the current circumstances in the region", subsequent to the Russian invasion of Ukraine. An LVMH spokesperson stated the company would continue to pay salary and benefits to its 3,500 employees in Russia. In November 2022, it was announced LVMH had acquired the Piedmont-based jewellery maker Pedemonte Group. In 2025, LVMH's Russian subsidiary extended the lease agreement for its office in the Citidel business centre on Zemlyanoy Val Street in central Moscow.

On 24 April 2023, LVMH became the first European company to reach a $500 billion valuation.

In November 2023, LVMH agreed to acquire the Los Angeles-based eyewear brand Barton Perreira for $80 million.

In June 2024, LVMH acquired Swiza, the owner of L'Epée 1839, a Swiss manufacturer of high-end clocks. L'Epée 1839 produces intricate clocks, including those with perpetual calendars and tourbillons.

In 2024 LVMH's revenue reached 84.68 billion euros, or 1% organic growth for the year.

In 2025, MHCS (part of Moët Hennessy and Louis Vuitton) applied for the registration of four champagne trademarks in Russia. According to Rospatent, these are the Moet & Chandon, Dom Pérignon, Ruinart, and Mercier brands.

In September 2025, following the death of Giorgio Armani, it was disclosed that LVMH had been named in Armani's will as a preferred buyer of a minority stake in the company. The plan provides for an initial 15% purchase within 18 months, with the option to increase this to as much as 54.9% over the following three to five years.

In November 2025, LVMH's watchmaking unit purchased a minority stake in Swiss manufacturer La Joux-Perret—a subsidiary of Citizen Watch Group.

In the first half of 2025, LVMH reported a 4% fall in revenue and a 22% plunge in profits. This is due to unexpected turbulence in the luxury market.

== Corporate structure ==
LVMH is headquartered in the 8th arrondissement of Paris, France. The company is listed on the Euronext Paris exchange and is a constituent of the CAC 40 index.

As of 2009, the group employed more than 83,000 people, 30 per cent of LVMH's staff worked in France, and LVMH operated over 2,400 stores worldwide.

As of 2010, the group had revenues of €20.3 billion with a net income of just over €3 billion. In 2013, with a revenue of $21.7 billion, LVMH was ranked first luxury goods company in Deloitte's "Global Powers of Luxury Goods" report. By 29 February 2016, the company had a share value of 78,126 million euros, distributed in 506,980,299 shares.

=== Shareholders ===
As of 2009, LVMH held 66% of the drinks division, Moët Hennessy, with the remaining 34% held by Diageo.

As of 2013, Christian Dior SE was the leading holding company of LVMH, owning 40.9% of its shares and 59.01% of its voting rights. Bernard Arnault is chairman and CEO of LVMH and Chairman of Christian Dior SE. In 2017, Arnault purchased all the remaining Christian Dior shares in a reported $13.1 billion buyout.

At the end of 2017, the only declared major shareholder in LVMH was the Arnault Family Group, the holding company of Bernard Arnault. The group's control amounted to 46.84% of LVMH's stock and 63.13% of its voting rights.

=== Senior leadership ===
Bernard Arnault has been LVMH's chairman and CEO since January 1989. Alain Chevalier was chairman from 1987 until Arnault took over the role.

In 2024, Stéphane Bianchi was appointed LVMH Group managing director, responsible for strategic and operational management of the Group Maisons. He also oversees the regional presidents, and the digital and data transformation of the Group. In addition, he is also the Chairman of the LVMH executive committee.

On 2 December 2025, Louis Vuitton CEO Pietro Beccari was appointed as the chief executive of LVMH's fashion division.

Total revenue for Q1 2025: €20,311 million, compared to €20,694 million in Q1 2024, a reported decrease of 2% and an organic decrease of 3% on a constant consolidation scope and currency basis

== Media group ==
In 2007, Arnault bought France's leading financial newspaper, Les Echos, from the British company Pearson for 240 million euros (US$262 million) after a negotiating period of four months.

In 2015, LVMH bought the newspapers Le Parisien and Aujourd’hui en France from the Amaury Group. Marie-Odile Amaury, the group's owner, initially hoped for 200 million euros ($218 million) which were later revised to 150 million ($163 million) during a previous sale attempt, but a bid of 50 million euros ($54.5 million) was made. The financial transaction was completed at the end of October 2015.

In 2018, the Lagardère Group sold the stock market information website Boursier.com to Les Echos-Le Parisien Group. In March 2018, Pierre Louette, former CEO of Agence France-Presse from 2005 to 2010, was named CEO of Les Echos-Le Parisien Group, succeeding Francis Morel, who had held this position for seven years.

In 2022, Les Echos-Le Parisien Group acquired 75% of the share capital of the French polling and research institute OpinionWay, which has 140 employees.

Les Echos-Le Parisien Group also acquired Radio Classique, Connaissance des Arts, and Investir and bought 50% of Medici.tv as well as Mezzo TV and EuroArts. Les Echos-Le Parisien Group is also present in business services represented by its subsidiaries, such as Netexplo, Les Echos Etudes, and Les Echos Publishing, as well as communication services for companies such as Les Echos-Le Parisien Partenaires and Pelham Media. ChangeNow, Investir Day, and VivaTech (co-founded with Publicis) are subsidiaries whose objective is to offer trade shows and corporate events.

On 6 August 2024, the Competition Authority grants authorization to LVMH for the acquisition of Paris Match. The group purchased the French weekly publication Paris Match in October 2024.

== Subsidiaries ==
A partial list, including some of LVMH's best-known brands and subsidiaries:

Wines and spirits

- Ao Yun
- Ardbeg
- Belvedere
- Bodega Numanthia
- Chandon
- Château d'Esclans (Whispering Angel)
- Château Cheval Blanc
- Château d'Yquem
- Château Galoupet
- Château Minuty
- Cheval des Andes
- Clos des Lambrays
- Cloudy Bay
- Colgin Cellars
- Dom Pérignon
- Glenmorangie
- Hennessy
- Krug
- Mercier
- Moët & Chandon
- Newton Vineyard
- Ruinart
- Terrazas de los Andes
- Veuve Clicquot
- Volcan de mi Tierra
- Woodinville
- Clos19

Fashion and leather goods

- Barton Perreira
- Berluti
- Celine
- Christian Dior Couture
- Emilio Pucci
- Armani (planned 15% stake under Giorgio Armani succession plan, announced September 2025)
- Fendi
- Givenchy
- JW Anderson
- Kapital
- Kenzo
- Loewe
- Loro Piana
- Louis Vuitton
- Moynat
- Patou
- Phoebe Philo
- Rimowa
- Vuarnet

Perfumes and cosmetics

- Acqua di Parma
- Benefit Cosmetics
- BITE Beauty
- Cha Ling
- Fenty Beauty by Rihanna
- Fresh
- Parfums Givenchy
- Guerlain
- Kenzo Parfums
- KVD Vegan Beauty
- Maison Francis Kurkdjian
- Make Up For Ever
- Officine Universelle Buly
- Ole Henriksen
- Parfums Christian Dior
- Perfumes Loewe
- Sephora

Watches and jewellery

- Bulgari
- Chaumet
- Daniel Roth
- Fred
- Gerald Genta
- Hublot
- Repossi
- TAG Heuer
- Tiffany & Co.
- Zenith

Selective retailing

- DFS
- La Grande Epicerie
- La Samaritaine
- Le Bon Marché
- Starboard Cruise Services
- 24S

Other activities

- Belmond
- Bulgari Hotel and Resorts
- Maisons Cheval Blanc
- Chez l'Ami Louis
- Connaissance des Arts
- Cova
- Investir
- Jardin d'Acclimatation
- Le Parisien
- Les Echos
- Paris Match
- Radio Classique
- Royal Van Lent

== E-commerce ==
In May 2018, LVMH launched an e-commerce initiative by investing in online fashion search business Lyst, as a way for LVMH's luxury brands to expand their presence online and capture younger shoppers. LVMH contributed to Lyst's $60 million funding round, which also included access to LVMH's international expertise, designed to drive Lyst's global expansion.

In May 2024, LVMH announced that it would expand its partnership with Alibaba to increase its presence in China.

== Business trends ==
The key trends of LVMH are (as of the financial year ending 31 December):

Year	Revenue (€ bn)	Net profit (€ bn)	Total equity (€ bn)	Number of employees (k)
2007	16.4	2.0	12.5	71.8
2008	17.1	2.0	13.8	77.0
2009	17.0	1.7	14.7	77.3
2010	20.3	3.0	18.2	83.5
2011	23.6	3.0	23.5	97.5
2012	28.1	3.4	25.6	106
2013	29.0	3.4	27.9	114
2014	30.6	5.6	23.0	121
2015	35.6	3.5	25.7	125
2016	37.6	3.9	27.9	116
2017	43.6	5.1	30.2	128
2018	46.8	6.3	33.9	130
2019	53.6	7.1	38.3	145
2020	44.6	4.7	38.8	150
2021	64.2	12.0	48.9	175
2022	79.1	14.0	56.6	196
2023	86.1	15.1	62.7	213
2024	84.8	12.5	69.2	215
2025	80.8	10.8	68.9	215

=== Sales by region ===
Region	2024 Sales in billion €	in %
Asia (excluding Japan)	23.25	27.5%
United States	21.55	25.4%
Europe (excluding France)	14.54	17.2%
Japan	7.48	8.8%
France	7.01	8.3%
Other countries	10.86	12.8%

== Philanthropy, sponsorships and events ==
=== Visual arts ===
LVMH is a major patron of art in France. The group supported about ten exhibitions as "Le grand monde d’Andy Warhol" and "Picasso et les maîtres" at le Grand Palais in Paris. LVMH also endorsed the patronage of "l'atelier d'Alberto Giacometti" and "Yves Klein" at Centre Georges Pompidou.

Since 2005, when the LVMH flagship store opened in Paris at 3, avenue George V, 75008, the company presented close collaborations with contemporary artists. Features included a light sculpture by American James Turrell, a 20-metre (65 feet) long "travelling staircase" showcasing the work of American video artist Tim White-Sobieski and an elevator linking the store to the top floor by Iceland's Olafur Eliasson.

In 2006, a gallery space was inaugurated on the second floor of the same building and named "Espace Culturel". "Icônes" was one of the first exhibitions. Shigeru Ban, Sylvie Fleury, Zaha Hadid, Bruno Peinado, Andrée Putman, Ugo Rondinone, James Turrell, Tim White-Sobieski and Robert Wilson were the nine artists invited by Louis Vuitton to participate in it. While the original Paris gallery no longer operates, LVMH sponsors six other Espace exhibitions, in Tokyo, Munich, Venice, Beijing, Seoul and Osaka.

In addition, LVMH foundation created the "young creators LVMH award", an international competition opened to French and international beaux-arts students. Each year, six grants are allocated to the winners.

In 2014, LVMH opened the Fondation Louis Vuitton pour la Creation in a new building designed by Frank Gehry in the Bois de Boulogne in Paris. The Fondation is designed as the Group's own museum to present its collections and organize major world-class art exhibitions.

=== Fashion ===
In November 2013, LVMH created the LVMH Young Fashion Designer Prize, which comes with a €300,000 grant with a year of mentoring; it was the brainchild of Delphine Arnault. In February 2014 20 finalists for the inaugural prize were shown in London, including Simone Rocha, Thomas Tait, Meadham Kirchhoff, Marques'Almeida, J JS Lee, and others, and Thomas Tait was the winner. Marques'Almeida won the 2015 prize. In 2019, South African designer Thebe Magugu became the first African to win the prize, and was commended by the President of South Africa, Cyril Ramaphosa.

LVMH underwrites other fashion competitions, including the Andam prize in France, the International Festival of Fashion and Photography in Hyères, France, an investment fund for young designers created by the French Ministry of Culture and Communication, and a scholarship program and sponsored lecture theatre at Central Saint Martins in London.

=== Music ===
The group also lends Stradivarius violins to young talented musicians. Maxim Vengerov and Laurent Korcia have used the instruments.

=== Humanitarian aid ===
On 26 August 2019, Bernard Arnault declared that LVMH would donate $11 million to help fight the 2019 Brazil wildfires. In 2021, UNESCO and LVMH launched the UNESCO x LVMH Project to protect critical rainforest within 8 biosphere reserves located in Bolivia (Pilón-Lajas and Beni Biosphere Reserves), Ecuador (Yasuní, Sumaco and Podocarpus-El Condor Biosphere Reserves), Brazil (Central Amazon Biosphere Reserve) and Peru (Manu and Oxapampa-Ashaninka-Yanesha Biosphere Reserves).

During the COVID-19 crisis, the group shifted its production of perfume and spirits towards hand sanitizer. This production of 12 tons has been offered to hospitals in Paris, France.

In 2022, Louis Vuitton announced a €1 million donation to UNICEF to help the Ukrainian victims of the Russian invasion. On 2 March 2022, LVMH Group pledged €5 million to the Red Cross to those affected by the war. In addition, the company closed 124 of its stores in Russia.

=== Sports ===
LVMH sponsored the Paris 2024 Olympic and Paralympic Games as a premium partner. The company spent €150 million to seal the partnership. Chaumet jewellery company was responsible for the design of the medals; one of LVMH's fashion houses, Berluti, dressed the French delegation; and Moët Hennessy provided its products for the events. Also as part of the partnership, LVMH participated in the activities of French Popular Relief, a charity organization that facilitates access to sport for 1,000 children and young people aged 4 to 25 living in vulnerable situations. The group sponsored athletes, which includes French swimmer Leon Marchand, and its beauty retailer Sephora sponsored the Olympic torch relay.

After Formula One's existing deal with Rolex expired in 2024, LVMH is set to re-enter the sport in 2025, investing $150 million annually in a multi-year deal. Through this partnership, TAG Heuer, having already sponsored the Monaco Grand Prix and Red Bull Racing Formula One teams, is set to return as Formula One timekeeper, with Louis Vuitton set to sponsor the Australian Grand Prix from 2025 onward.

=== Journées Particulières ===
Launched in 2011, Journées Particulières (Particular Days) is a biennial event which allows visitors to enter the various ateliers, studios, caves, and mansions owned by LVMH, for free.

For the first edition we were not at all certain that the public would come. I speak about that with some emotion. I remember coming along avenue Montaigne at 8 am that first morning and seeing hundreds of people, families, elderly ladies and little kids waiting for the doors of avenue Montaigne 30 to open and I thought we are going to write a beautiful page in history.

— Antoine Arnault, referring to Christian Dior's headquarters

It is staged every two years and has opened doors in France, Italy, Switzerland, the UK, the Netherlands, Spain and Germany, with 56 brands welcoming guests into over 70 sites on four continents. The 2017 issue attracted 145,000 visitors.

== Controversies ==
=== John Galliano's antisemitism ===
On 25 February 2011, Christian Dior announced they had suspended designer John Galliano following his arrest over an alleged antisemitic tirade in a Paris bar. In France, it is against the law to make anti-semitic remarks of this nature, and it can be punished by up to six months in prison. On 1 March 2011, Christian Dior officially announced that it had fired Galliano amidst the controversy.

=== Corruption ===
During December 2021, LVMH paid €10 million to settle claims in Paris to end several criminal investigations that a former French intelligence chief, Bernard Squarcini, spied for the company, on competitors and others, including on journalist François Ruffin making a film about its billionaire owner, Bernard Arnault. Prosecutors allege that the intelligence chief used tactics like influence peddling, invasion of privacy, and leveraging his network in intelligence and police on behalf of the company.

=== 2024 Olympic medals ===
LVMH faced controversy in 2025 when it was revealed that the Olympic medals created by subsidiary Chaumet for the 2024 Summer Olympics had begun to deteriorate and fall apart. By January 2025 over 100 Olympic medalists had requested replacement medals.

=== 2025 PETA investigations ===
In April 2025, a set of investigations launched by PETA (People for the Ethical Treatment of Animals) uncovered disturbing practices at slaughterhouses that supply LVMH. PETA raised concerns about conscious snakes being inflated with water, struck with hammers, and cut with razors. They also reported that minks and foxes were raised in cramped and unsanitary conditions before being electrocuted, gassed, bludgeoned, or skinned alive.

=== 2025 Wine and Spirits Division financial crisis ===
In May 2025, The Financial Times reported that Moët Hennessy, LVMH's wines and spirits division, had undergone a significant financial and strategic crisis under former CEO Philippe Schaus. The investigation cited a reversal from over €1 billion in cash flow in 2019 to a €1.5 billion cash burn in 2024, linked to aggressive price increases, a series of acquisitions, and cultural tensions within the group. The article also raised questions about LVMH's executive oversight during this period.

=== 2025 strikes ===
In December 2025, workers at LVMH's wine and spirits division Moet Hennessy were called by CGT labour union to plan a series of strikes starting on 5 December to urge management to pay year-end bonuses. On 9 December, CGT called for a gathering of workers to decide on further strike action.

== See also ==
- Kering
- Luxottica
- Richemont
- The Estée Lauder Companies
