= Louis Étienne Ravaz =

Louis Étienne Ravaz or Louis Ravaz (Saint-Romain-de-Jalionas, Isère, 1863 — Montpellier, 1937) was a specialist of ampelography and one of the creators of modern viticulture. In 1892, he founded the grape research station of Cognac (French: Station viticole de Cognac), that he directed for several years. He was professor of viticulture (and from 1919 director) at the National School of Agriculture of Montpellier (École nationale d’agriculture de Montpellier). He contributed to the diffusion of the use of the American varieties in the regions affected by French blight (Phylloxera) and investigated the pathologies of the grapevine. He published several works on viticulture. With Pierre Viala, he described the causes of the black-rot disease of grapevine and founded the "Revue de viticulture".

He was the taxon author of:

- Guignardia Viala & Ravaz, Bull. Soc. mycol. Fr. 8: 63 (1892)

== Works ==
- Le "Rot" blanc ou "Coniothyrium diplodiella (French) by G. Foëx and L. Ravaz / Montpellier : C. Coulet, 1888
- Les Vignes américaines : adaptation, culture, greffage, pépinières. (French) with Pierre Viala (1892) (link at gallica.bnf.fr)
