= Douce noir =

Variety of grape

- Grape (Vitis)
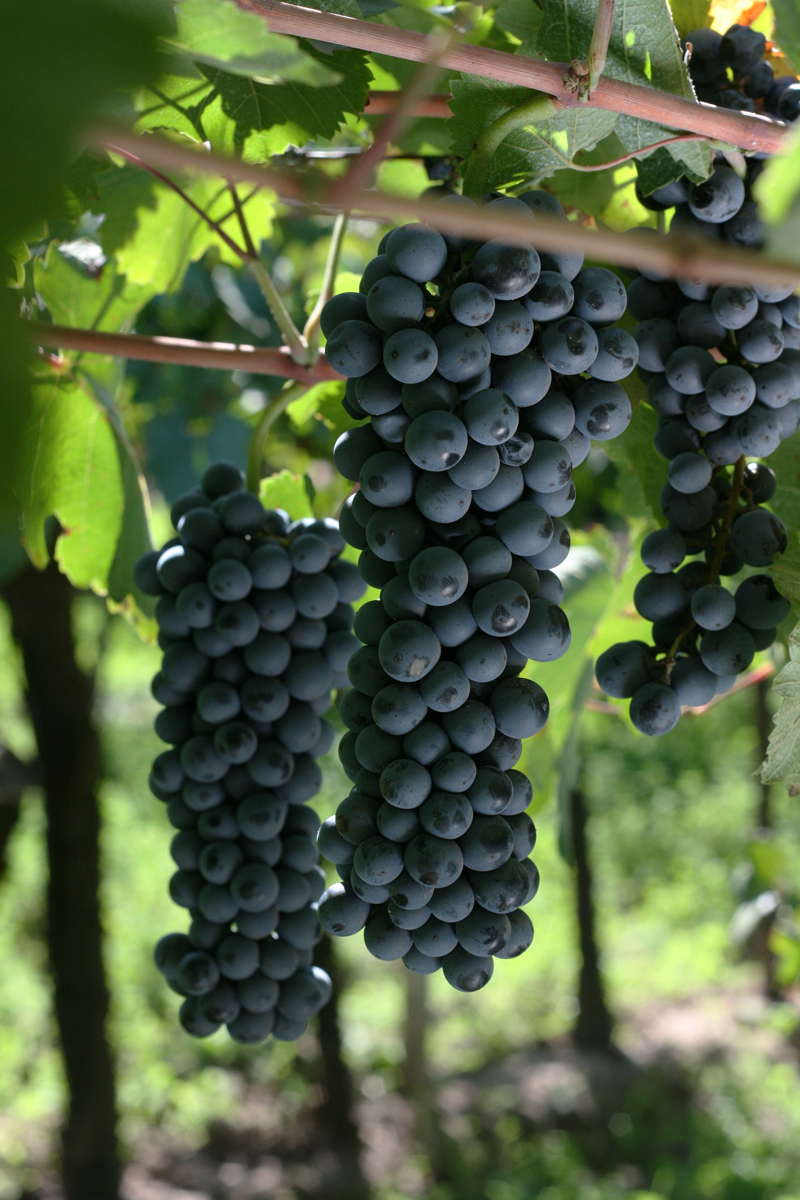
- Douce noir/Bonarda grapes growing in Argentina
- Color of berry skin: Noir
- Species: Vitis vinifera
- Also called: Bonarda, Corbeau, Charbonneau more
- Origin: Savoy
- Sex of flowers: Hermaphrodite

Douce noir (also known as Bonarda, Corbeau and Charbono) is a red Savoyard wine grape variety that has historically been grown in the Savoy region, but today is more widely planted in Argentina.

It arrived in Savoy in the early 19th century, and by the end of the century it was the most widely grown red wine grape in the region. It is the second most widely planted red grape in Argentina (after Malbec). The grape is also grown in California where it is known as Charbono.

In California, Bonarda/Douce noir/Charbono is produced in very limited amounts with the grape having been described as a "cult wine" for its scarcity and devotion of its connoisseurs. However, journalists such as Alan Goldfarb describes the variety as "... the Rodney Dangerfield of wine" and notes that it is a hard variety to find a market for.

== History and origins ==
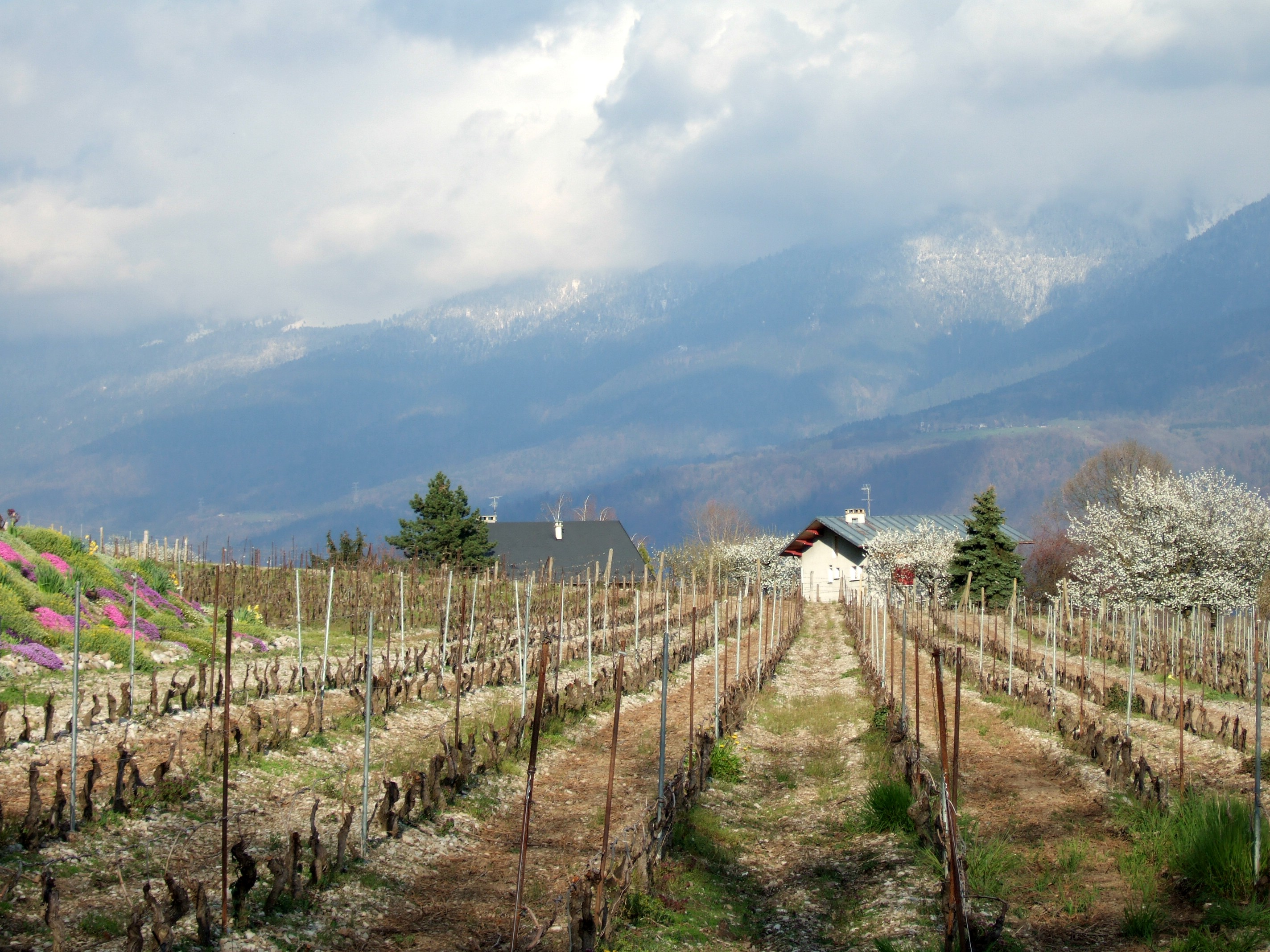
Vineyards in Savoie where Douce noir likely originated

Some of the early synonyms of Douce noir, Plant de Turin and Turin, hinted that the grape has originated in the Piedmont wine region of Italy. The name Douce noir itself means "sweet black" in French which is similar to the Italian name of the Piedmont grape Dolcetto nero ("small sweet black") which further lead to the fact that Douce noir had Piedmontese origins. This hypothesis, as well as any relation with Dolcetto, would later be dispelled by DNA analysis in the 21st century and today ampelographers believe that the grape likely originated in the Savoie region of eastern France.

In Savoie, the earliest mention of the grape variety dates to a letter written on November 24, 1803 by the mayor of Saint-Pierre-d'Albigny to the prefect of Savoie describing the grape varieties growing in his commune. Other documents showed that Douce noir was also widely planted in the communes of Arbin and Montmélian and by the end of the 19th century it was the most widely planted red grape variety in Savoie.

Douce noir was also found outside of Savoie, particularly in Jura, where the grape was known as Corbeau which means "crow" and is thought to be a reference to the inky black color of the wine that Douce noir can produce.

=== Discovery of other plantings ===
While plantings of Bonarda/Douce noir dwindled in Italy and France, DNA research of grape varieties in other wine growing regions revealed that the grape was more widely planted than originally thought. In 2000 DNA analysis revealed that the Turca grape growing in the Veneto wine region of northeast Italy since at least the early 20th century was actually Bonarda. This came after the discovery that the Charbono wine grape of California, introduced to the Napa Valley as Barbera by Italian immigrants in the early 19th century, was also Bonarda/Douce noir/Corbeau. Further research confirmed by 2008 that the Bonarda/Charbono grape that was the second most widely planted red grape variety in Argentina, after Malbec, was actually the Savoie wine grape Bonarda/Douce noir.

== Viticulture and relationship to other grapes ==
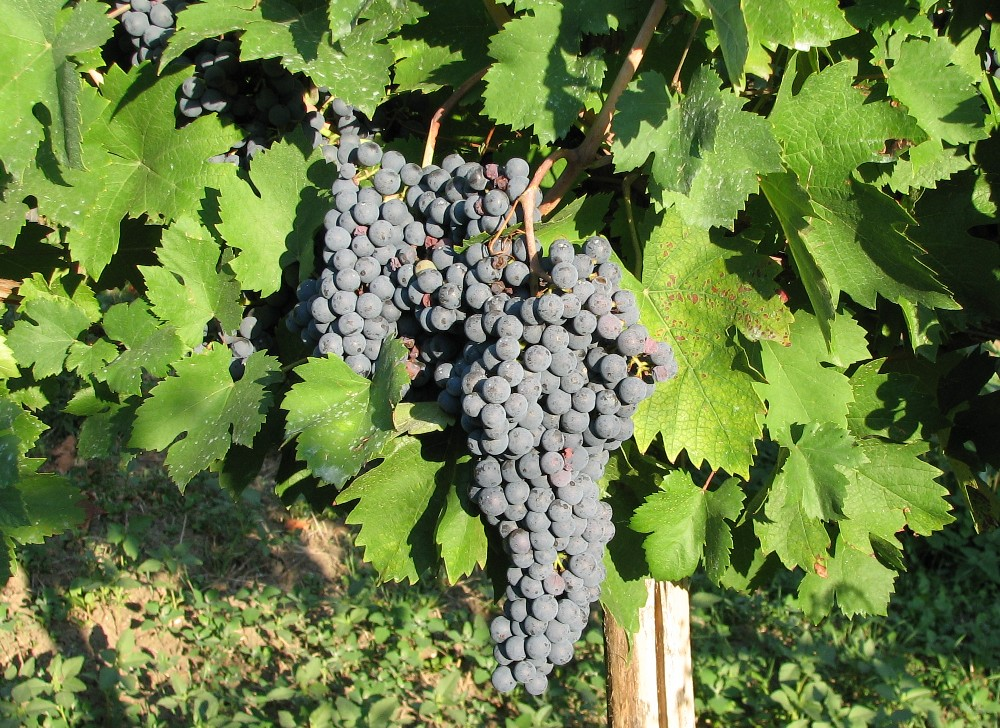
DNA profiling has shown that Douce noir, which is known as Bonarda in Argentina, is not related to any of the Italian grape varieties, such as Croatina (pictured) that are also known as Bonarda.

Bonarda/Douce noir is a very late ripening grape variety that is often harvested after Cabernet Sauvignon. To extend the growing season, some vignerons will prune early in January in order to promote early bud break. The grape has very thick skins and a high phenolic content which requires heat in order to achieve physiological ripeness but excessive heat can risk creating "cooked flavors" in the resulting wines. Growers in California have discovered some of the more ideal vineyard locations for Douce noir/Charbono are warm-climate sites with significant diurnal temperature variations from a drop in night time temperature.

In California, many of the Bonarda/Douce noir/Charbono vines are very old with some blocks over 70 years old. Many of these vines have developed various viral grape diseases and producers have slowly been replanting acres with young vines of newer clones and rootstock. The yield for many of these older plantings is often around 2.5 to 3 tons/acre (approximately 47 to 57 hectoliters/hectares) while younger plantings can often produce 6 to 8 tons/acre (approximately 114 to 152 hl/ha).

Despite sharing several synonyms and often being confused for one or the other, Douce noir has no known relationship to the Piedmontese grapes Dolcetto and Bonarda Piemontese nor to any of the other Italian varieties that have Bonarda as a synonym such as Croatina and Uva Rara. It also has no known relationship to Douce Noire grise an old French variety that according to ampelographer Pierre Galet is no longer cultivated.

== Wine regions ==
Today Douce noir is far more likely to be found in the New World wine regions of California and Argentina than it is in native France. In 2007 there were only 2 hectares (5 acres) of Douce noir reported in production most of it in the Savoie and Jura wine region where it is often blended with Persan. One producer makes a varietal style under the Vin de Pays d'Allobrogie designation.

In Argentina, the 18,759 hectares (46,354 acres) of Bonarda/Douce noir makes it is the second most widely planted red grape variety in the country after Malbec and representing 8% of the country's total vineyard plantings. The vast majority of the plantings are in the Mendoza wine region but significant plantings can also be found in the La Rioja, San Juan, and (the relatively unknown) Catamarca provinces. Here the grape is used for both blending (sometimes with Malbec or even Cabernet Sauvignon) but also as a varietal wine that Master of Wine Jancis Robinson notes has the potential to be of high quality. It is mostly produced as a still red wine, but is also made into sparkling wines and rosé.

=== California Charbono ===
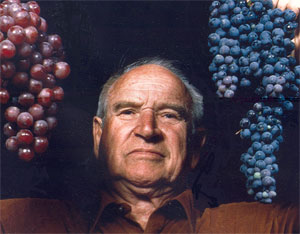
Harold Olmo from the University of California, Davis was one of the first to realize that Inglenook's plantings of Barbera were not the Italian wine grape but rather a completely different variety, Bonarda/Charbono. Later discoveries would show that California's Charbono was actually the Italian wine grape Bonarda/Douce noir.

In California, where the grape is known as Charbono, the variety has a long history in the Napa Valley where it was an important variety for producers such as Inglenook and Parducci, even though it was mistakenly labeled as Barbera, and sometimes Pinot noir, until the 1930s. Inglenook won many wine competitions with the variety labeled as Barbera and Parducci would often blend the grape with its other (true) Pinot noir plantings. It wasn't until research conducted at the University of California, Davis by Harold Olmo and, later, Albert Winkler, confirm that these various plantings of Barbera and Pinot noir were, in fact, a different grape altogether, which was called Bonarda/Charbono. Inglenook would release its first varietal labeled Charbono in 1941. In 1999, Carole Meredith, also of UC-Davis, would link Charbono to the grape Bonarda/Douce noir/Corbeau.

In 2008, there were 36 hectares (88 acres) of Bonarda/Charbono/Douce noir with nearly half of those plantings in Napa Valley, particularly in the warm Calistoga AVA. Other plantings can be found in the American Viticultural Areas of Monterey, Madera, Mendocino Lodi, Dos Rios, Sierra Foothills and Mount Veeder. While sometimes used a blending variety, the grape has been prominently featured as a varietal or major component of wines from Heitz Wine Cellars, Turley Wine Cellars, Castoro Cellars, Pear Valley Vineyards Robert Foley, and Bonny Doon Vineyard.

== Styles ==
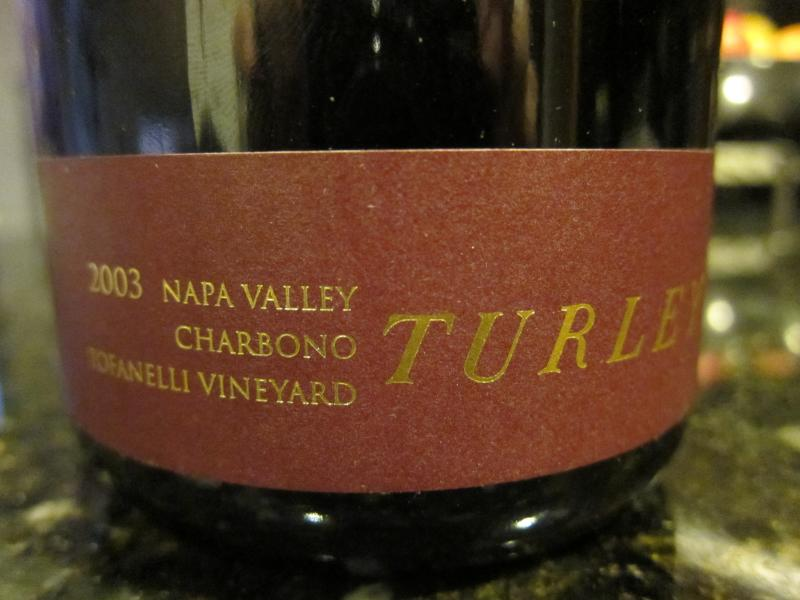
A California Douce noir labeled as Charbono.

In the Old World wine regions of France and Italy, Bonarda/Douce noir is often used as blending grape contributing to the mid-palate of the wine. In California, the grape is often made as a varietal wine. There, many of the Bonarda/Douce noir/Charbono vines planted are very old, producing a very dense, medium to full bodied wine with a deep, inky purple color and moderate acidity. The wines often have black fruit and plum aroma and flavor notes that can develop into leather and tar notes as the wine ages. Well-made examples from favorable vintages can have the potential to age in the bottle for 10 to 20 years.

In Argentina, varietal examples of Douce noir/Bonarda are similarly characterized by a deep purple color with notes of cassis, fennel, cherry, and dried fig. Wine expert Oz Clarke notes that the grape needs a long growing season and time to fully ripen or the wines will have green, vegetal flavors.

Bonarda/Douce noir lends itself to moderate alcohol levels, only very rarely going above 14%. In food and wine pairings, this can make Douce noir a very versatile wine that can be paired with game meat as well as chicken, cheese and seafood dishes in heavy sauces.

== Synonyms ==
Over the years Bonarda/Douce noir has been known under a variety of synonyms including: Alcantino, Aleante, Batiolin, Bathiolin (in Albertville), Blaue Gansfuesser, Bonarda (in Argentina), Bourdon noir, Carbonneau, Charbonneau (in Jura), Charbono (in California), Corbeau (in the Ain and Isère departments as well as Jura), Cot Merille, Cot Rouge Merille, Cote Rouge, Dolcetto Grosso, Dolutz, Douce noire, Folle Noire d L'Ariege, Grenoblois, Korbo, Mauvais noir, Ocanette, Picot Rouge, Plant de Calarin, Plant de Montmelion, Plant de Savoie, Plant de Turin (in Jura), Plant noir (in the Haute-Savoie department), Turca (in the Trentino region of Italy), Turin (in Jura) and Turino.
