= École nationale supérieure agronomique de Rennes =

French higher education institute

Coordinates: 48.1135°N 1.7063°W

Agrocampus Rennes
- École nationale supérieure agronomique de Rennes
- Active: 1849–2008
- Location: Rennes, Brittany, France

École nationale supérieure agronomique de Rennes (ENSAR) (Higher Institute for Agricultural Sciences of Rennes) is a French higher education institute, known as a grande école. It is one of the most prestigious French Engineering schools specialized in applied Life sciences, with an emphasis on agronomy and the agri-food industry. The city of Rennes holds a strategic position owing to its central location within the foremost agricultural and food basin in Europe.

The school was founded during the XIXth century. In 2004 the name of the school became Agrocampus Rennes. In 2008, the school merged with the Angers National horticultural institute to form Agrocampus Ouest. Since 2020, Agrocampus Ouest has been part of the Agro Institute, jointly with Montpellier school and the Dijon school. In 2022, the school becomes Institut Agro Rennes-Angers.

== Academics ==
=== Presentation ===
The public higher education system in France includes universities and other institutions called grandes écoles, with a selective admission process through which students are admitted by a nationwide entrance exam (notably after two or three years of prépas).

=== Multidisciplinary training ===
Graduates from the École nationale supérieure agronomique de Rennes (ENSAR) are well-equipped in problem-solving capabilities, interdisciplinary research, and methods for applying science to real-world problems and issues. The multidisciplinary training received, enables engineers to mobilize knowledge and skills in the fields of Life sciences, engineering, as well as economics and social sciences. It prepares the next generation of leaders to address the world's critical challenges related to agriculture, food systems, natural resources, as well as to building and maintaining sustainable territories and communities. As a high-level versatile professional, the engineers graduated from the École nationale supérieure agronomique de Rennes (ENSAR) particularly master the design and evaluation of integrated approaches as they relate to complex systems, mirroring concepts arising from living systems within their environment.

== History ==
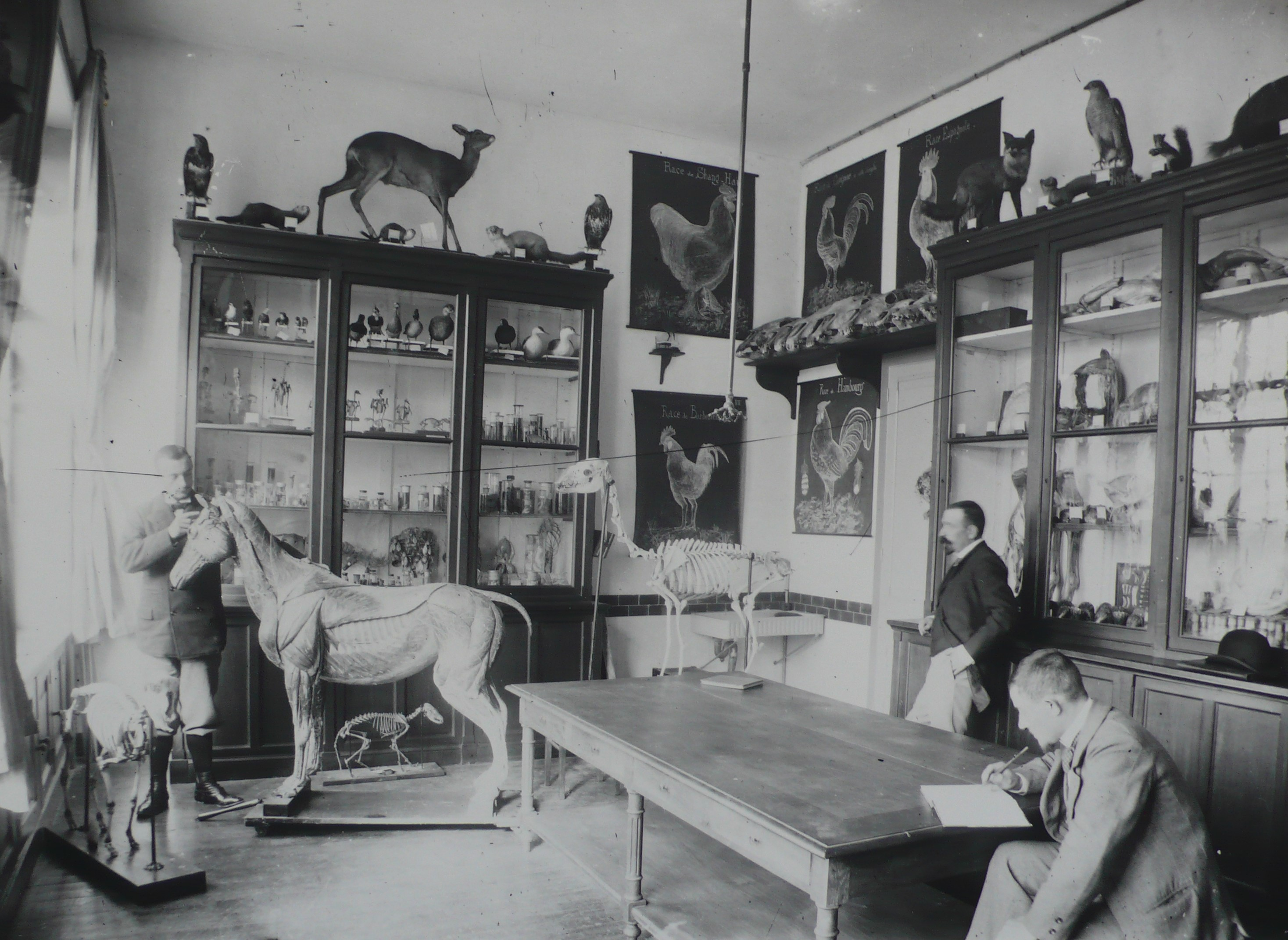
Practice in school in 1910

The school was founded on the Grandjouan location in Nozay (Loire-Atlantique) in 1830, where it was recognized by the government as a national agricultural school in 1870. Then, following numerous debates, it moved to Rennes (Ille-et-Vilaine), where it has been located since 1896. It became a national agronomic school in 1962. First a farm school in Nozay, it became the national agricultural school of Grandjouan, then the school moved to Rennes in 1896. In 1962, it became one of the French National Higher Agronomic School. Then in 1964, the school became the National Higher School for Women in Agronomy (ENSFA) (1964–1992) ; The national higher agri-food training institute (INSFA). Agrocampus Rennes in 2004, then Agrocampus Ouest, and : Institut Agro Rennes-Angers (2008–2020).

=== Teachers ===
Marie Joseph Saint-Gal (1841–1932) was first a tutor-preparer of rural engineering and botany-forestry in 1864. Then he worked as a teacher at the imperial agricultural school of Grignon in 1869 where he remained a year. Having become professor of the chair of botany and forestry, he returned to the national agricultural school of Grandjouan in 1870, where he was also president of the Friendly Association of Former Students created in 1863. Author of several works on botany. In 1865 he planted a sequoia on the grounds of the Grandjouan school (wellingtonia gigantéa – giant sequoia), still present in 2015.

== See also ==
- Agricultural education
