= Mornen noir =

Variety of grape

- Grape (Vitis)
- Color of berry skin: Noir
- Species: Vitis vinifera
- Also called: Kékmedoc, Medoc noir
- Origin: France
- Notable regions: Chavanay
- VIVC number: 8004

Mornen noir is a red French wine grape variety that was historically grown in both the Rhône and Loire departments but is today only found in very limited plantings around the commune of Chavanay.

DNA profiling has revealed a potential parent-offspring relationship between Mornen noir and Chasselas. At one time Mornen noir was thought to be a dark-berried color mutation of Chasselas. ('Mornen' is itself a synonym of 'Chasselas'.) While ampelographers have confirmed that Mornen noir is not a Chasselas color mutation, the grape's exact relationship with Chasselas has not yet been determined.

It was thought that the grape was also to be found growing in Hungary under the names Kékmedoc and Medoc noir, but DNA analysis has confirmed that the Hungarian plantings are actually a separate variety now known as Menoir (which is listed in the Vitis International Variety Catalogue a cross between Chasselas and Muscat D'Eisenstadt.)

== History ==
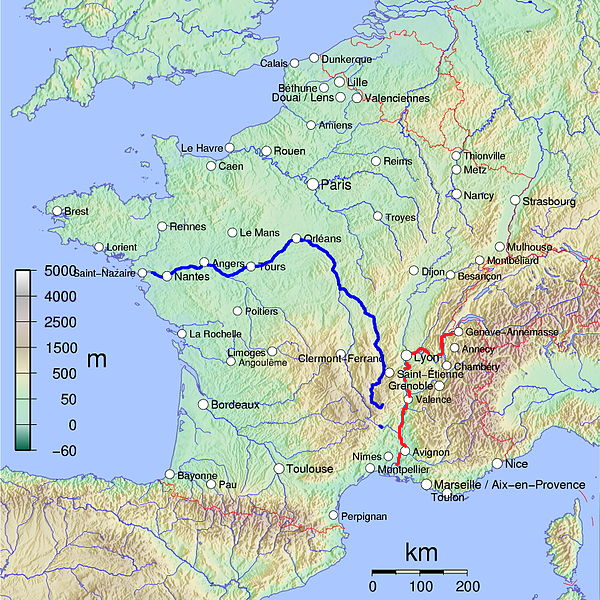
Ampelographers believe that Mornen noir likely originated in the western Rhône-Alpes in the area between the Rhone (in red) and Loire (in blue) rivers.

The first mention of Mornen noir growing in eastern France dates to 1872, but the exact origins of the grape are not clear. In 1902, L. Rougier, an ampelographer writing for Pierre Viala and Victor Vermorel's catalog of grape varieties, speculated that Mornen noir was indigenous to the western Rhône-Alpes region in the area between the Rhone and upper Loire rivers. Rougier noted that the name Mornen noir is likely a derivative of the commune Mornant where the grape has been historically grown with Chasselas.

The close connection between Chasselas and Mornen noir led to the speculation that Mornen noir was a dark-berried color mutation of Chasselas, which is known as Mornen blanc in the Mâconnais region of Burgundy. However, while DNA profiling has confirmed that the two varieties are distinct and not color mutations of one or the other, the evidence does strongly suggest that a parent-offspring relationship exist between the two grapes. A discovery in the Savoie wine region, where Chasselas is widely grown, that plantings of an old variety known as Montruchon in a conservation vineyard ran by Domaine Grisard were, in fact, Mornen noir also strongly suggest a relationship between the two varieties.

== Viticulture and confusion with other grapes ==
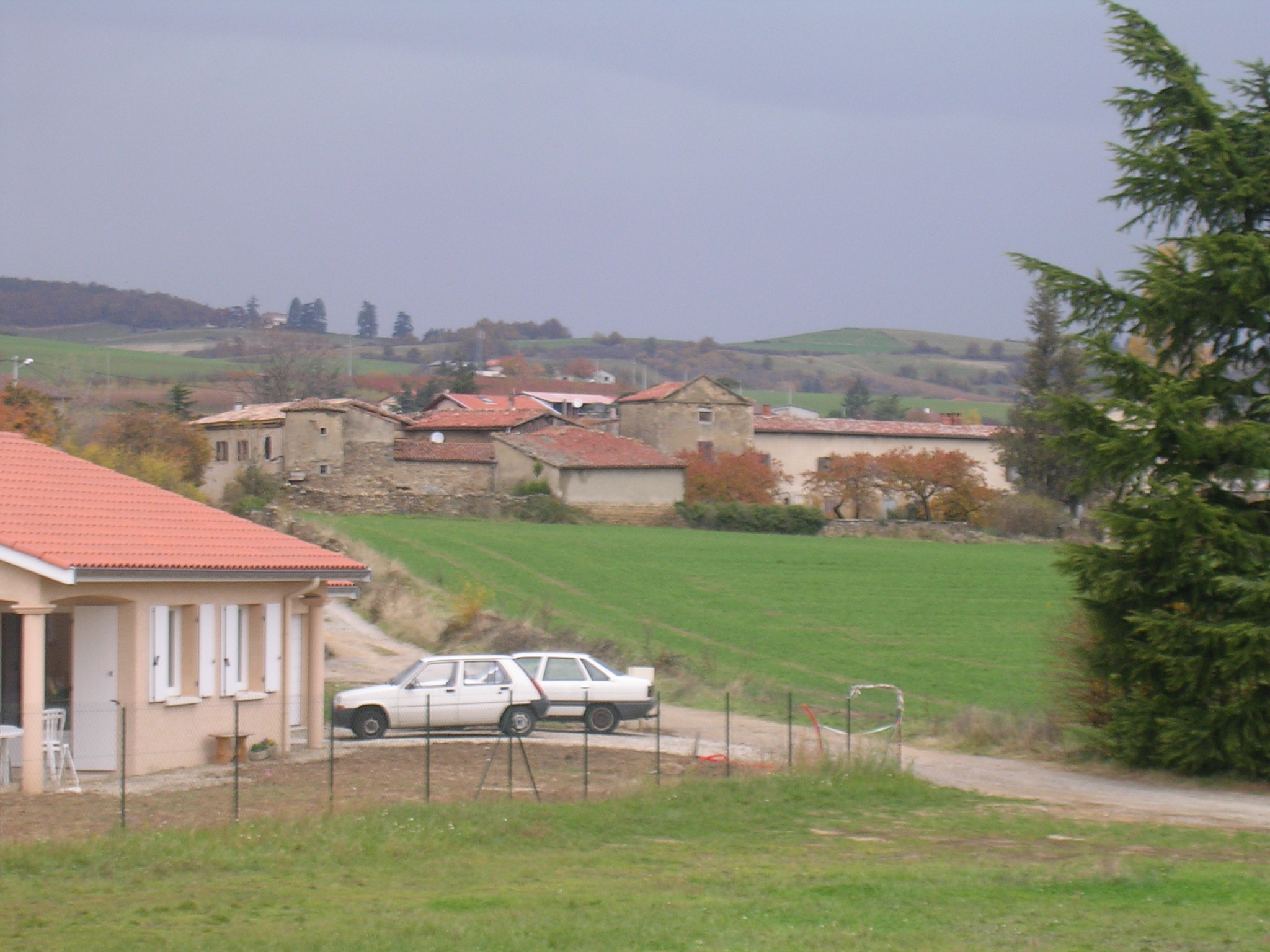
The commune of Mornant in the Rhône department where the name Mornen noir may have been derived from.

Mornen noir is an early to mid-ripening grape variety.

In the late 20th century, French ampelographer Pierre Galet reported that the Médoc noir/Kékmedoc growing in Hungary was the same as Mornen noir. However, the synonym Médoc noir has been used for a number of French wine grape varieties in Hungary, including Merlot and Malbec so there were grounds for skepticism about a connection with Mornen noir. In 2009, DNA analysis of the Hungarian vines showed that they were not Mornen noir, or Merlot and Malbec, but rather a completely different variety known as Menoir.

This grape is also called Gulja noir, Kulja (today Yining) was a city inhabited by Turco-Mongols tribes, like the Huns that populated Hungary under Attila rule.

== Wine regions ==
Mornen noir is not currently listed in France's official registry of grape varieties and is not permitted for use in any Appellation d'origine contrôlée (AOC) wine. While the grape was once widely planted throughout the Rhône and Loire departments now it only found in very limited plantings around the commune of Chavanay in the Loire.

Since 2008, growers have been expanding plantings of the grape, as well as another local variety Chouchillon, along the Gier river for use in wine labeled as Coteau du Gier.

== Synonyms ==
Over the years Mornen noir has been known under a variety of synonyms including: Chasselas noir, Goulu noir, Gulja noir, Ljali surh, Medoc noir, Montruchon (in Savoie), Mornant (in the Rhône department), Mornen, Mornen nero, Mornerain, Mornerain noir (in the Loire department), Mornerein and Perrier noir.
