= Douce Noire grise =

Variety of grape

Douce Noire grise or (Dame Noire grise) is a red French grape variety that was described by ampelographer Pierre Galet in his 2000 work Dictionnaire encyclopédique des cépages but is not longer used in commercial wine production. Despite the similarities in their names, Douce Noire grise is not a color mutation of, or directly related to, the French wine grape Douce noir which is also known as Bonarda in Argentina and Charbono in California.

== Synonyms ==
Over the years, Douce Noire grise has been known under a variety of synonyms including: Batarde Ronde, Dame noire, Douce Noire du Bois, Dame Noire grise and Ocanette de la Tarentaise.
