= Gustave Foëx =

French ampelographer

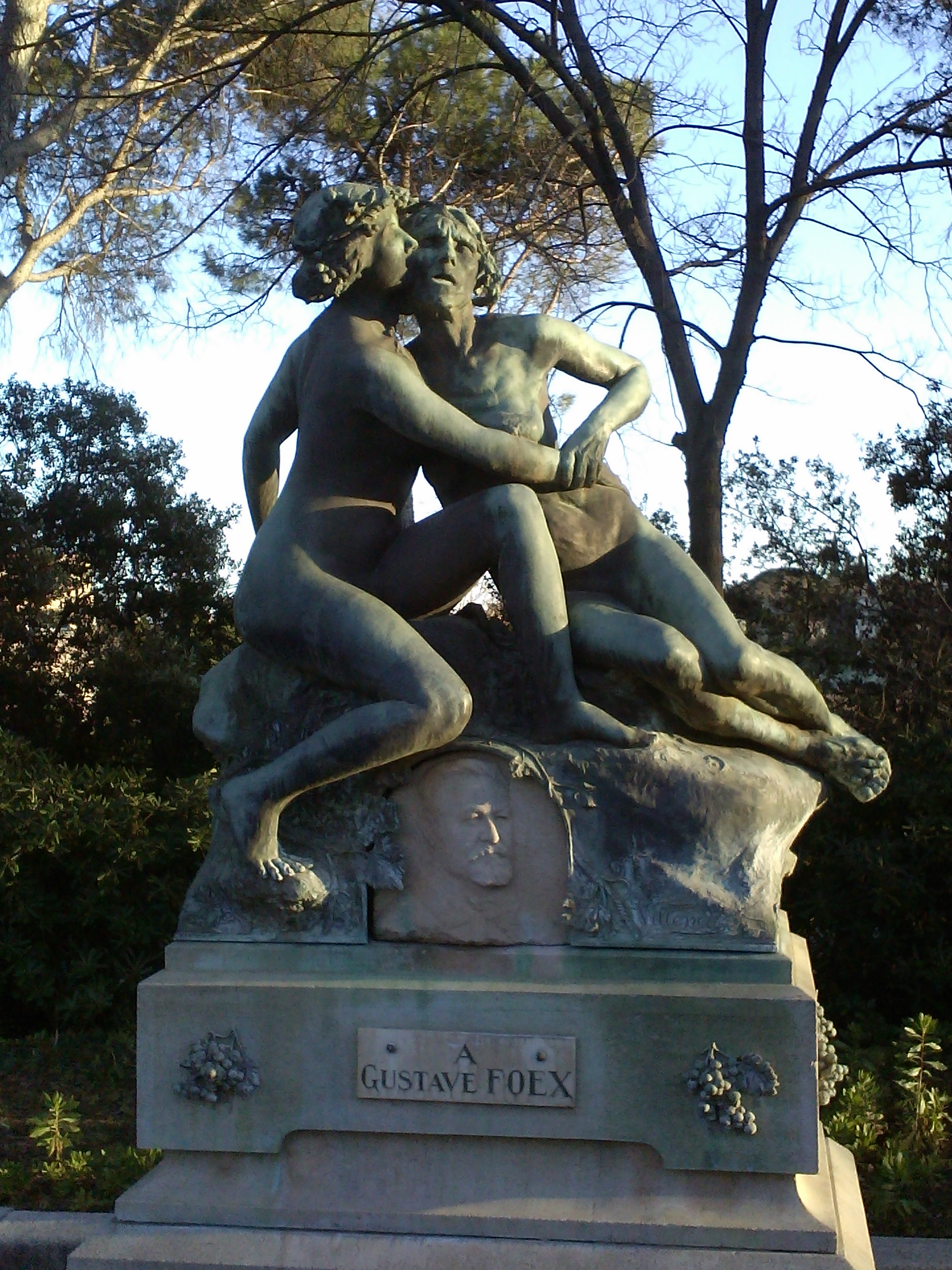
Monument in honor of Gustave Foëx on the Montpellier Supagro main campus

Gustave Foëx (Gustave Louis Émile Foëx, born in Marseille in 1844 - died in 1906) was a French ampelographer and a colleague of Pierre Viala.

Gustave Foex was Director of the National School of Agriculture of Montpellier (French: École nationale d’agriculture de Montpellier, now known as Supagro) from 1881 to 1897 and was a professor of viticulture there from 1870 to 1896 and he created the school vineyard in 1876 to test the American vine-stock's resistance to phylloxera). At the end of the 19th century, Montpellier was recognized to be the foremost European centre for studying vines, attracting both eminent researchers and viticulture specialists to the school.

== Works ==
- Les vins américains : 1er rapport de la dégustation : 2ème rapport sur la composition des vins américains par M. J. Leenhardt-Pomier / M. Saintpierre et Foëx / Montpellier : impr.Centrale du Midi, 1875
- Programme des études pratiques de viticulture et d'ampélographie : 1° Rapport à M. le préfet de l'Hérault par M. Camille Saintpierre, par M. Foex, ... / Montpellier : C. Coulet, 1876
- Rapport à M. le Directeur de l'Ecole d'Agriculture de Montpellier sur les expériences de viticulture entreprises par M. Foex,...; Ecole nationale supérieure agronomique de Montpellier, Laboratoire d'agriculture et de viticulture / Montpellier : C. Coulet, 1879
- Causes de la résistance des vignes américaines aux attaques du phylloxéra : Ecole nationale d'agriculture de Montpellier, Station viticole par M. G. Foéx / Montpellier : Boehm et fils, 1879
- Catalogue des vignes américaines et asiatiques et des ampélopsis cultivées dans les collections en 1879...[Ecole Nationale d'Agriculture de Montpellier] par M.G. Foëx / Montpellier : C. Coulet, 1879
- Manuel pratique de viticulture pour la reconstitution des vignobles méridionaux : vignes américaines, submersion, plantation dans les sables par M. Gustave Foex / Montpellier : Camille Coulet, 1881
- Manuel pratique de viticulture pour la reconstitution des vignobles méridionaux : vignes américaines, submersion, plantation dans les sables par M. Gustave Foëx / Deuxième édition, revue et considérablement augmentée / Montpellier : Camille Coulet, 1882
- Instructions sur l'emploi des vignes américaines à la reconstitution des vignobles de l'Hérault par Gustave Foëx; sur ordre du Conseil Général de l'Hérault / Montpellier : Boehm et fils, 1882
- Mémoire sur les causes de la chlorose chez l'herbemont / Gustave Foex...... / Montpellier : Camille Coulet, 1882
- Instructions relatives à l'établissement des pépinières de vignes américaines par G. Foëx, Directeur de l'Ecole Nationale d'Agriculture de Montpellier / Paris : Imprimerie Nationale, 1883
- Manuel pratique de viticulture pour la reconstitution des vignobles méridionaux par M. Gustave Foëx / 3e éd. / Montpellier : Coulet, 1884
- Ampélographie américaine : Description des variétés les plus intéressantes de vignes américaines, avec une introduction à l'étude de la vigne américaine par M. Gustave Foe͏̈x,... M. Pierre Viala,... / 2ème édition / Montpellier : aux bureaux du "Progrès agricole et viticole, (1885)
- Catalogue des ampélidées cultivées à l'Ecole Nationale d'Agriculture de Montpellier (1884) par G. Foex Directeur et professeur de viticulture. / Montpellier : Typographie et lithographie Bohem et fils, 1885
- Le Mildiou ou Peronospora de la vigne. Montpellier, Coulet; Paris, Delahaye, 1885. (with Pierre Viala).
- Cours complet de viticulture 44. 1886
- Les vignes américaines et les maladies de la vigne : conférences par M. Gustave Foex / Genève : Athénée, 1887
- Manuel pratique de viticulture pour la reconstitution des vignobles méridionaux : vignes américaines, submersion, plantation dans les sables par Gustave Foex / 4e éd. revue et considérablement augm / Montpellier : C. Coulet, 1887
- Création de pépinières départementales : Rapport sur la reconstitution par les cépages américains des vignes phylloxérées, et instructions relatives au traitement du mildiou par M. Foëx....; Département du Doubs. / Besançon : impr. de Millot frères, 1888
- Cours complet de viticulture par M. Gustave Foëx,... / 2e éd. revue et considérablement augmentée / Montpellier : Camille Coulet, 1888
- Le "Rot" blanc ou "Coniothyrium diplodiella par G. Foëx,... et L. Ravaz / Montpellier : C. Coulet, 1888
- Rapport sur le plâtrage des vins par G. Foëx / Montpellier : C. Coulet, 1888
- Catalogue des ampélidées cultivées à l'Ecole Nationale d'Agriculture de Montpellier (1889) par G. Foex,... / Montpellier : Typographie et lithographie Charles Boehm, 1889
- Carnet de notes ampélographiques, destiné aux élèves de l'école nouvelle d'agriculture de Montpellier par M. G. Foëx, directeur et professeur de viticulture. / Montpellier : Impr. Serre et Ricome, 1890
- Manuel pratique de viticulture pour la reconstitution des vignobles méridionaux : vignes américaines, submersion, plantation dans les sables par Gustave Foëx,... / 5e éd. revue et considérablement augmentée / Montpellier : C. Coulet, 1891
- Cours complet de viticulture par G. Foëx,.. / 3e édition, revue et considérablement augmentée avec 6 cartes en chromo hors texte et 575 gravures dans le texte / Montpellier : C. Coulet, 1891
- Cours complet de viticulture par M. G. Foëx,... / 4e éd., revue et considérablement augmentée... / Montpellier : C. Coulet, 1895
- Comment devons-nous reconstituer nos vignobles ? : Les vignobles nouveaux, emploi des vignes Américaines par M. Gustave Foëx ... / Deuxième édition / Paris : E. Brocheriouxt, 1899
- Manuel pratique de viticulture pour la reconstitution des vignobles méridionaux : Vignes américaines, submersion, plantation dans les sables par M. Gustave Foëx ... / 6ème édition, / Montpellier : C. Coulet, 1899
- Historique de la crise phylloxérique en France : exposition universelle de 1900 : congrès international de viticulture, 13-17 juin 1900, Paris par G. Foex,... / Paris : Société anonyme de publications périodiques, 1900
- La vinificación moderna : ¿Cómo debemos debemos hacer nuestro vino? por Gustave Foëx / Santiago de Chile : Impr. moderna, 1900
- Los viñedos nuevos : ¿Cómo debemos reconstituir nuestros viñedos? por Gustave Foëx / Santiago de Chile : Impr. moderna, 1900
- La vinificación moderna : ¿Cómo debemos hacer nuestro vine ? Gustave Foex; Trad. al castellano y anot. en lo que se refieremás particularmente a Chile i Sud-América por Gaston Lavergne / Santiago de Chile : Impr. y lit. Franco-chilena, 1902-1903
