= Medoc noir =

Medoc noir is an alternative name to several wine grape varieties including

- Malbec
- Merlot
- Mornen noir
- Menior, Hungarian wine grape that is known as Medoc noir in Hungary and was once thought to be the same variety as Mornen noir
