= ESIREM =

Coordinates: 47.31231°N 5.074101°E

Ecole Supérieure d'Ingénieurs Numérique et Matériaux
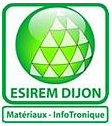
- Type: Public
- Established: 1991
- Director: Albert Dipanda (acting director)
- Students: 800, 900
- Undergraduates: Classe préparatoire
- Postgraduates: Bac+5, French equivalent to Master's Degree
- Location: Burgundy, Burgundy, France
- Website: esirem.u-bourgogne.fr

Ecole Supérieure d'Ingénieurs Numérique et Matériaux (ESIREM) is a French public research engineering school founded in 1991. It is one of the five^{[a]} grandes écoles of the University of Burgundy and is located in Dijon, France. The professors (mostly researchers) have been involved in efforts to develop data processing, embedded systems, telecommunications networks, algorithms and optics. The engineering programs offered at ESIREM have also expanded beyond the physical sciences to include courses such as business management and project management.

The school was previously known as FIRST and changed its name to ESIREM in 1998.

== Degrees offered ==
ESIREM delivers diplômes d'ingénieurs (equivalent to Masters of Engineering or MEng in Anglophone countries) in two distinguished fields, Informatique/Électronique (computer science and electronics) and Matériaux (material science). Each department has about 50-100 students and produces about 100 graduates a year. Its building is located between the sports faculty and the sciences faculty at the University of Burgundy.

Both engineering degree programs are accredited by the Commission des titres d'ingénieur (CTI) and Ministère de l'enseignement supérieur et de la recherche (Ministry of higher education and research). ESIREM is a member of the Conference de Grandes Ecoles de Bourgogne.

== Admission ==
Admissions are highly selective and based on exam results and personal interviews. Students also can sit for a national exam for Grandes écoles.

ESIREM has the standard admission process for Grandes écoles, where students have to have completed the following series of preparatory coursework:

Admission to first year (out of three years) requires Cycle preparatoire (2 years), the core course curriculum of the Groupe Archimède engineering schools (2 years, Mathematics, Chemistry, Physics, Engineering Science, and Modern Technologies), IUT scientifique (2 years), and Licence scientifique (2 years).

Admission to second year (out of three years) requires Masters M1, IUP, and MST (3 years).

=== Tuition costs ===
The average tuition is €700 a year, with scholarships available. The fee includes lectures, lab studies, insurance and registration. See Education in France for further details.

== Academics ==
Most lectures are conducted in French. Students are also required to pass the TOEIC English test with a minimum mark of 780/990. While most students are French, there are significant numbers of foreign students starting a program each year. Students are encouraged to intern in foreign countries.

=== Material sciences ===
Matériaux or material sciences was the main degree program at ESIREM when it was founded. It covers all aspects of material science, research and material engineering.

=== Computer science and electronics ===
Informatique/Électronique (Computer engineering, telecommunication and electronic engineering) was founded in 2003 in response to the increasing demand for engineers in the industry worldwide. First-year students in this program are required to complete an extensive two-semester core curriculum that covers physics, mathematics and computer science.

During the second year, students can choose to pursue their studies in embedded electronics (Systèmes Embarquées (S.E)), network security & quality (Sécurité et Qualité des Réseaux (S.Q.R)) or software engineering (Ingénierie des Logiciels et des Connaissances (I.L.C)). Students are trained to overcome stress and solve problems professionally during the second and third years, becoming skilled engineers in a number of areas.

=== Apprenticeship contract ===
Students who wish to work in the engineering industry can work under ESIREM's supervision at the company of their choice. Students must complete project-based activities during this period, rather than odd jobs. The Apprenticeship contract (or contrat de professionnalisation) begins in October and lasts until the end of the school year.

=== Internship ===
Students are required to complete an internship each year. In the first year, the internship must last at least a month. In the second year, it is at least 12 weeks, and in the third year, at least six months. Many students intern abroad in Europe, Asia, Africa and the Americas.

== Research and collaboration ==
ESIREM has numerous collaborative partnerships with laboratories, foreign universities and companies. These collaborations have been gradually increasing.

== Activities ==
BDE ESIREM has an active student council that manages various activities from the annual GALA to sports events.

== Logo ==
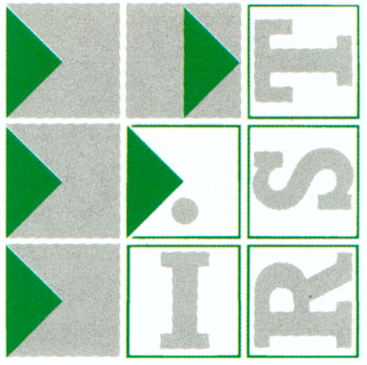
1991-1998

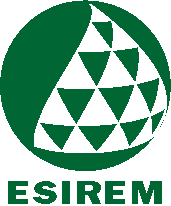
1998-2007

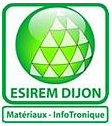
2007-2016

== Notes ==
a. The other Grandes écoles are Agrosup Dijon (ex-ENESAD and ENSBANA), ISAT and ITII
