= École nationale supérieure d'horticulture =

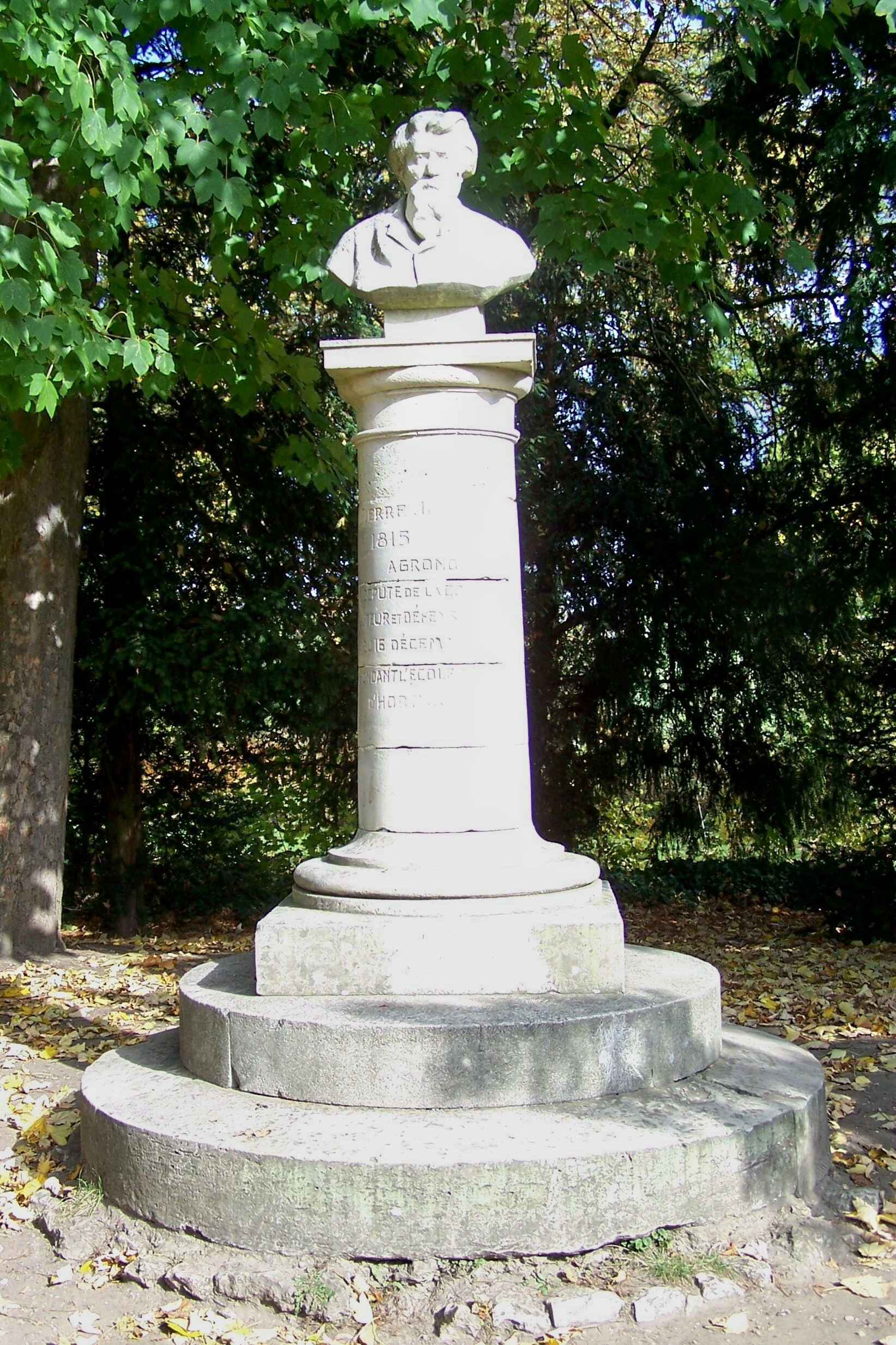
- Pierre Joigneaux Memorial in the parc Balbi
- Active: 1874–1998
- Location: Versailles, Île-de-France, France

L'École Nationale Supérieure d'Horticulture (Ecole Nationale Supérieure d'Horticulture de Versailles, Ecole Nationale d'Horticulture) was a French grande école (Note: The Grandes Écoles (literally, in French, "great schools") of France are higher education establishments outside the main framework of the French university system. Student selection for a Grandes Écoles is based chiefly on national assessment in competitive written and oral exams. These exams occur mostly two years after graduation. Between graduation and the exams, students follow what are called classes préparatoires, as part of a higher selection system.) of horticulture.

It was founded in 1874, on initiative of Pierre Joigneaux and the first Director was Auguste Hardy, to promote French agricultural education (Under the Act of 16 Dec. 1873). The school was located in the “Potager du Roi” (the King's kitchen garden) in Versailles where the former Institut National Agronomique had been established in October 1848 at the end of the Second Republic. At first it was named Ecole Nationale d'Horticulture, being changed to Ecole Nationale Supérieur d'Horticulture (ENSH) in 1961.

In 1976, the Ecole Nationale Supérieure de Paysage (ENSP) was separated from the ENSH, and both remain located at the Potager du Roi. In 1995, the ENSH was transferred to Angers, while the ENSP remained at Versailles. Three year later, the ENSH was officially combined with the national school of practitioners of horticulture and landscape (Ecole National des Ingénieurs de l'Horticulture et du Paysage ENITHP) in Angers to produce the Institut National d'Horticulture et de Paysage (National Institute for Horticulture and Landscape Management).

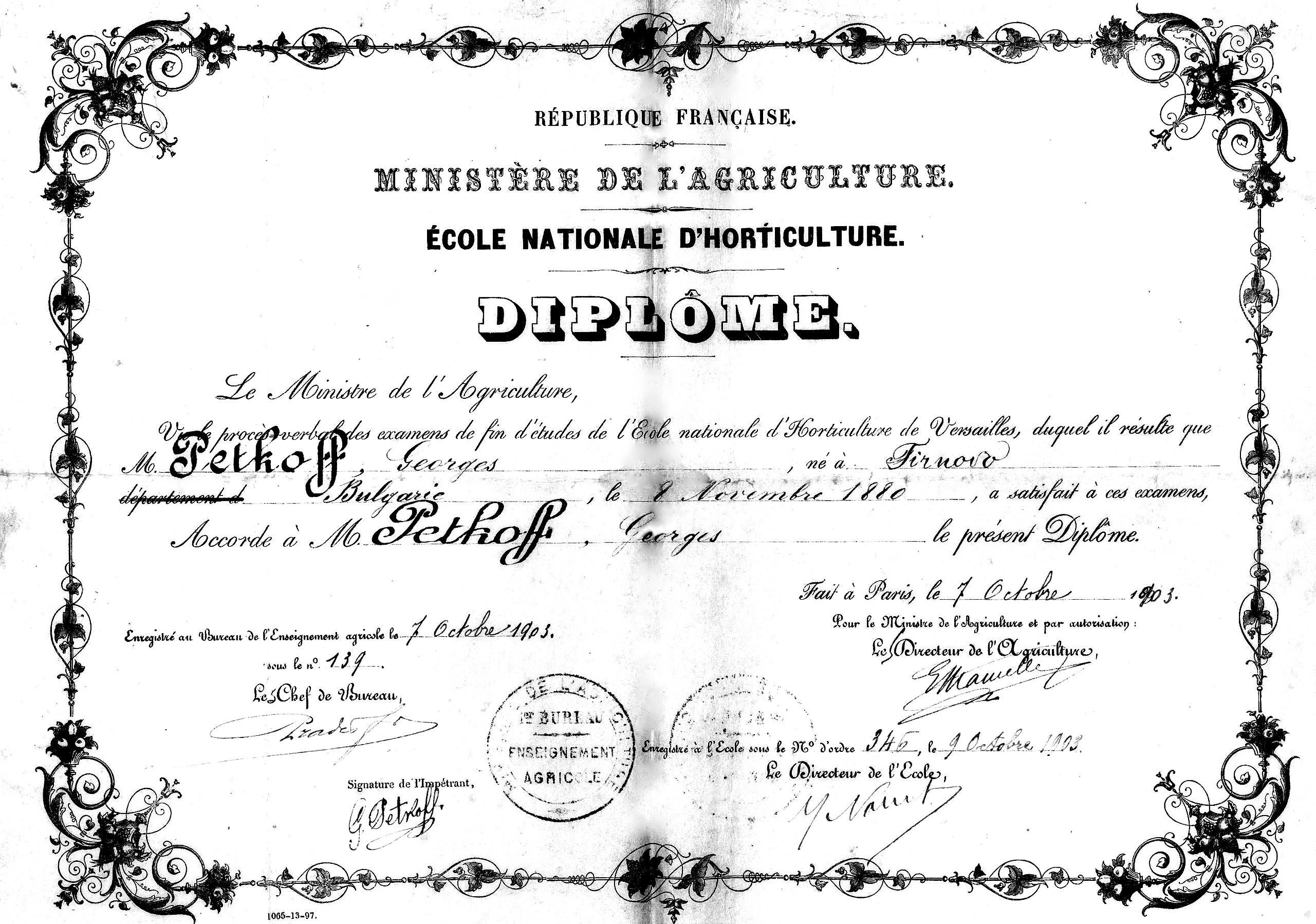
Diploma of the Ecole Nationale d'Horticulture, 1903

== History ==
In October 1848 France's agricultural education was reformed through the creation of the Institut National Agronomique at Versailles specialising in the vegetable garden. In 1849, Auguste Hardy, agronomist, became Head Gardener of the institute, replacing Mr Massey in the garden and beginning student education. At the end of the Republic, the institute is abandoned because the Emperor, like his royal predecessors, preferred the garden as a simple source of provisions. However, in 1865 Hardy created a school dedicated to the development of new fruit varieties using improved techniques, more greenhouses and sheltered areas.

After 1866 many organisations vied for control of the school until in 1872 Pierre Joigneaux proposed l'École Nationale d'Horticulture (ENH), which was opened in 1874. It was to be self-financing from the sale of the products of the garden maintained by fifty "student-workers". Its mission was: "the training of expert gardeners who are able, after two years of theoretical and practical studies, to spread and popularize good horticultural practices and principles in our departments." The garden was considered ideally situated: "considering all the horticultural wealth gathered at Versailles, nowhere could provide a training more complete and more varied."

The school then continued its tradition of production and experimentation. A weather station was installed, and different research programmes were implemented on cultivation, preservation of the fruit, chemical treatments. Greenhouses now covered the space between the Figuerie and Rue Satory near the gate of the King. It still uses some of these greenhouses.

In 1889 a winter garden full of ornamental species was established, the covered area being 5,600 m2. The school was now at the forefront of French horticulture and had developed an international reputation with alumni taking leading positions in botanical gardens and farms worldwide. Hardy also accentuated the botanical nature of the ENH, implementing a school of Botany with 1900 plant species, a rose garden with 800 plants. After winter 1879–80, whose cold destroyed nearly 10,000 trees, new cultivars were introduced: 309 varieties of apples and 557 varieties of pears. More than thirty forms of fruit-producing trees were in the garden: spiral, triangular prism, fan, cords, and candelabras.

In 1891 with the death of Auguste Hardy, Jules Nanot maintained the reputation of the Jardin du Roi and the ENH. Student education included studies of the architecture of the gardens and greenhouses taught by Darcel (a colleague of Alphand), and then by the famous landscape architect Édouard André, between 1892 and 1905, and his son René- Édouard André, who succeeded Duprat. Gradually, the teaching of the landscape architecture and design increased, creating a distinctive Versailles genre and its disciples. The program involves a thorough knowledge of plants, the science of architecture, optics, and project management. This lead in 1945 to a course on "the landscape and art of gardens".

In 1961, the ENH awarded a diploma of horticultural engineer and became a National College recruiting students who had already completed their higher education and were seeing more theoretical and modern research.

== Merger ==
The Institut National d'Horticulture et de Paysage (National Institute for Horticulture and Landscape Management) was established in 1997 as a merger of two grandes écoles, the Ecole Nationale Supérieure d'Horticulture (ENSH) at Versailles and the Ecole Nationale des Ingénieurs de l'Horticulture et du Paysage (ENITHP) at Angers. In July 2008, the Institut National d'Horticulture et de Paysage at Angers and the Agrocampus Rennes (in Rennes), merged again to form a new grande école called Agrocampus Ouest. Agrocampus Ouest consists in two centres:

- one in Angers,
- the other at Rennes.

Angers'centre of Agrocampus Ouest (or INHP) is located on the campus of Angers-Technopole, and this is now the only public higher education establishment specialising in horticultural engineering, and one of the few specialising in landscape design. Together with other educational and research establishments, the INHP researches the ecophysiology of plant development and production systems, genetic resources and plant breeding, plant protection, seed physiology, horticultural sectors of the economy, and forms in the landscape.

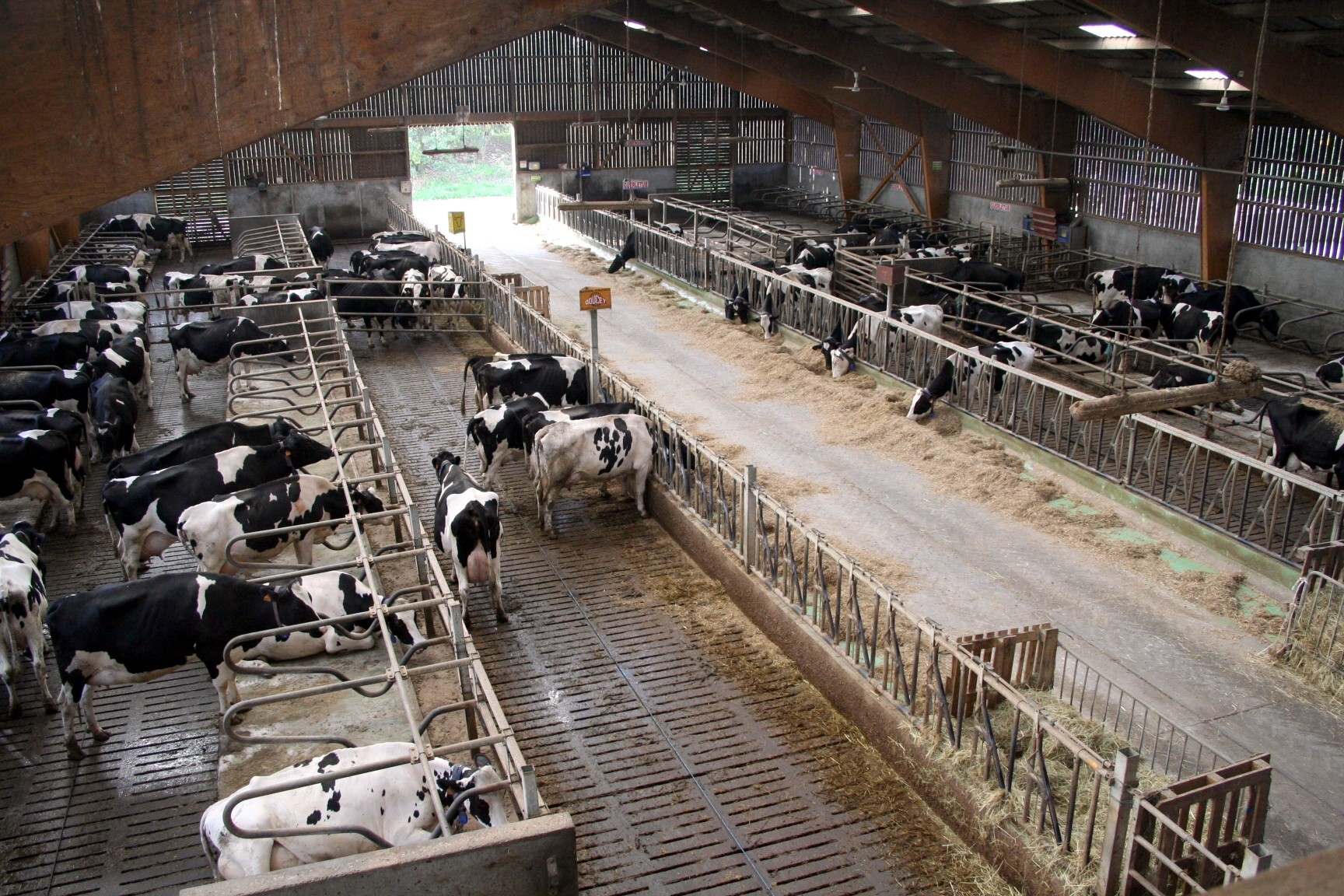
Experimental farm at the former Institut National Agronomique Paris-Grignon

[The Institut National Agronomique Paris-Grignon (INA P-G) was a French grande école. It was created in 1971 by merging the Institut national agronomique (Paris) and the École nationale supérieure d'Agronomie de Grignon, thus having a history that goes back to 1826.] INA P-G disappeared as an administrative entity on January 1, 2007, becoming part of AgroParisTech with ENSIA and ENGREF.

== See also ==
- Arboretum de Grignon
- Jardin botanique de l'Institut National
