= Marie Joseph Saint-Gal =

Joseph Saint-Gal
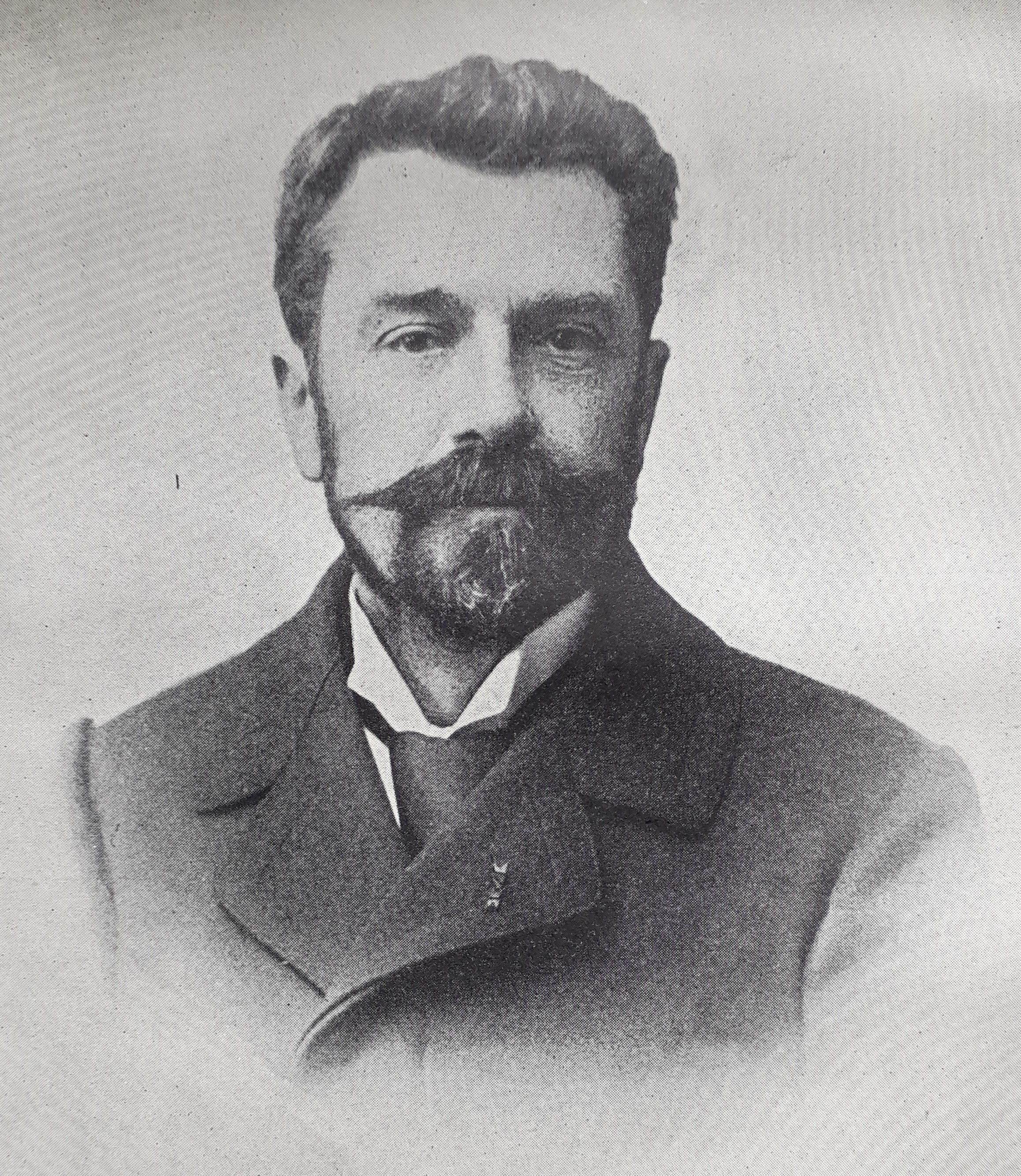
- Portrait
- Born: 1841; Redon, France
- Died: 1932 (aged 90–91)
- Scientific career
- Institutions: Ecole nationale supérieure agronomique de Rennes and École nationale supérieure d'agronomie de Grignon

Marie Joseph Saint-Gal (1841-1932) was a French botanist.

Born on February 11, 1841, in Redon, France, Joseph Saint-Gal's father was a driver of the Ponts et Chaussées.

After graduating from the Imperial School of Agriculture of Grand-Jouan in 1863, Joseph Saint-Gal became a tutor-preparer of rural engineering and botany-forestry in 1864. Then he worked as a teacher at the imperial agricultural school of Grignon in 1869, where he remained for a year. Having become professor of the chair of botany and forestry, he returned to the national agricultural school of Grandjouan in 1870, where he was also president of the Friendly Association of Former Students created in 1863. He received the Legion of Honour on July 30, 1894. He died in 1932. He is the author of several botanical works. In 1865, he planted a sequoia on the grounds of the Grandjouan school (wellingtonia gigantéa - giant sequoia), still present in 2015 measuring 30.50 meters in height with a circumference of 6.40 meters at one meter from the ground.
