= Saint-Romain-de-Jalionas =

- Commune
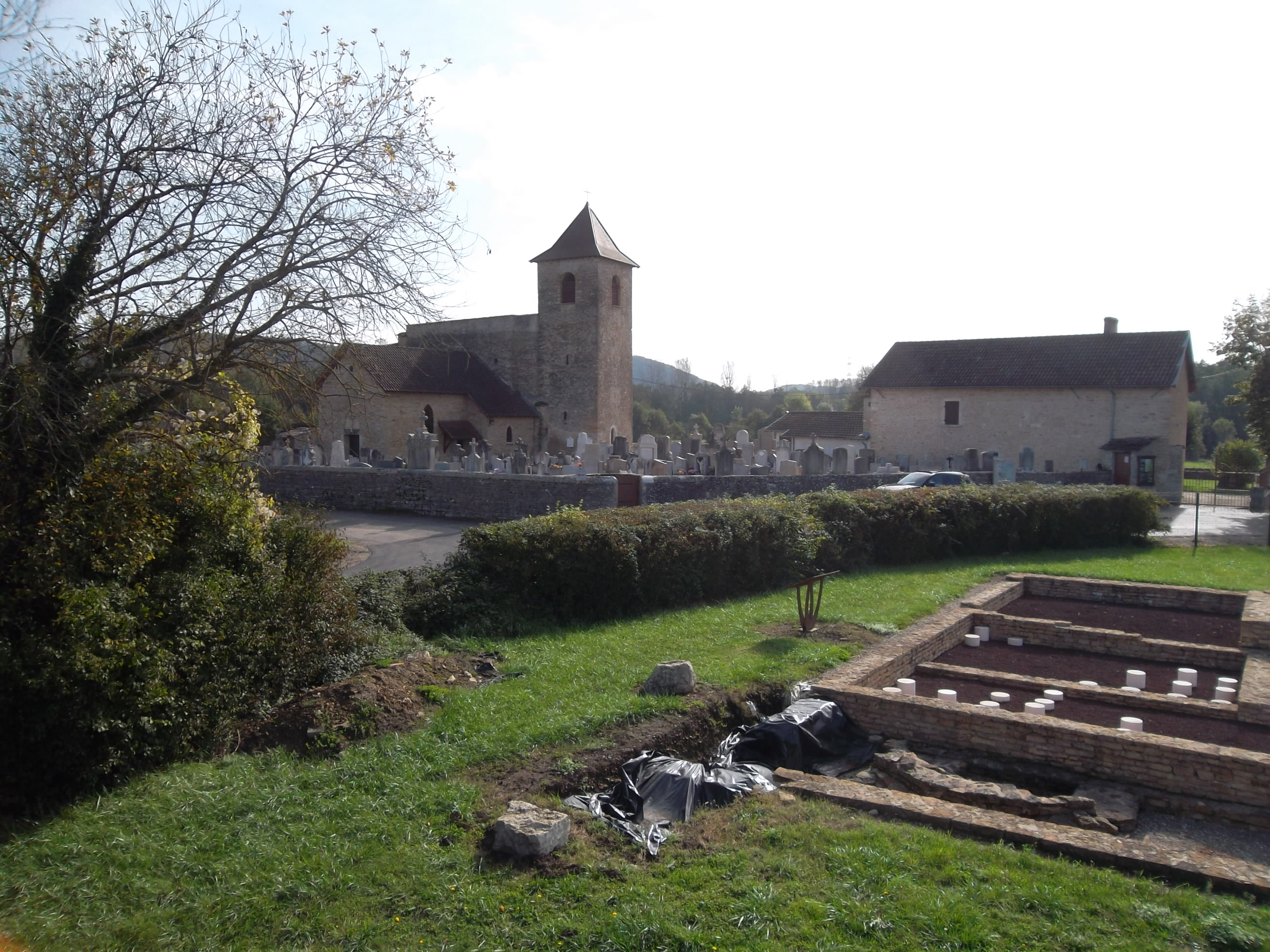
- The archaeological remains of a Gallo-Roman villa

- Coat of arms
- Location of Saint-Romain-de-Jalionas
- Location within France Location within Auvergne-Rhône-Alpes
- Coordinates: 45°45′26″N 5°13′10″E
- Country: France
- Region: Auvergne-Rhône-Alpes
- Department: Isère
- Arrondissement: La Tour-du-Pin
- Canton: Charvieu-Chavagneux

Government
  - Mayor (2020–2026): Jérôme Grausi
- Area^{1}: 13.65 km^{2} (5.27 sq mi)
- Highest elevation: 222 m (728 ft)
- Lowest elevation: 194 m (636 ft)
- Population (2023): 3,417
  - Density: 250.3/km^{2} (648.4/sq mi)
- Time zone: UTC+01:00 (CET)
  - Summer (DST): UTC+02:00 (CEST)
- INSEE/Postal code: 38451 /38460
- ^{1} French Land Register data, which excludes lakes, ponds, glaciers > 1 km^{2} (0.386 sq mi or 247 acres) and river estuaries.

Saint-Romain-de-Jalionas (French pronunciation: [sɛ̃ ʁɔmɛ̃ də ʒaljɔnas]) is a commune in the Isère department in southeastern France, in the Auvergne-Rhône-Alpes region.

== Population ==
Historical population

Year	Pop.	±% p.a.
1793	383	—
1821	511	+1.04%
1846	592	+0.59%
1872	578	−0.09%
1901	516	−0.39%
1926	563	+0.35%
1946	506	−0.53%
1962	601	+1.08%
1968	659	+1.55%

Year	Pop.	±% p.a.
1975	1,179	+8.67%
1982	1,816	+6.37%
1990	2,461	+3.87%
1999	2,749	+1.24%
2007	3,030	+1.22%
2012	3,162	+0.86%
2017	3,288	+0.78%
2023	3,417	+0.64%

Source: EHESS and INSEE (1968–2023)

== See also ==
- Communes of the Isère department
- Louis Etienne Ravaz (born in Saint-Romain-de-Jalionas in 1863 — Montpellier, 1937), a specialist of ampelography and one of the creators of modern viticulture
