= Institut Agro Montpellier =

French education and research institute

- L'Institut Agro Montpellier
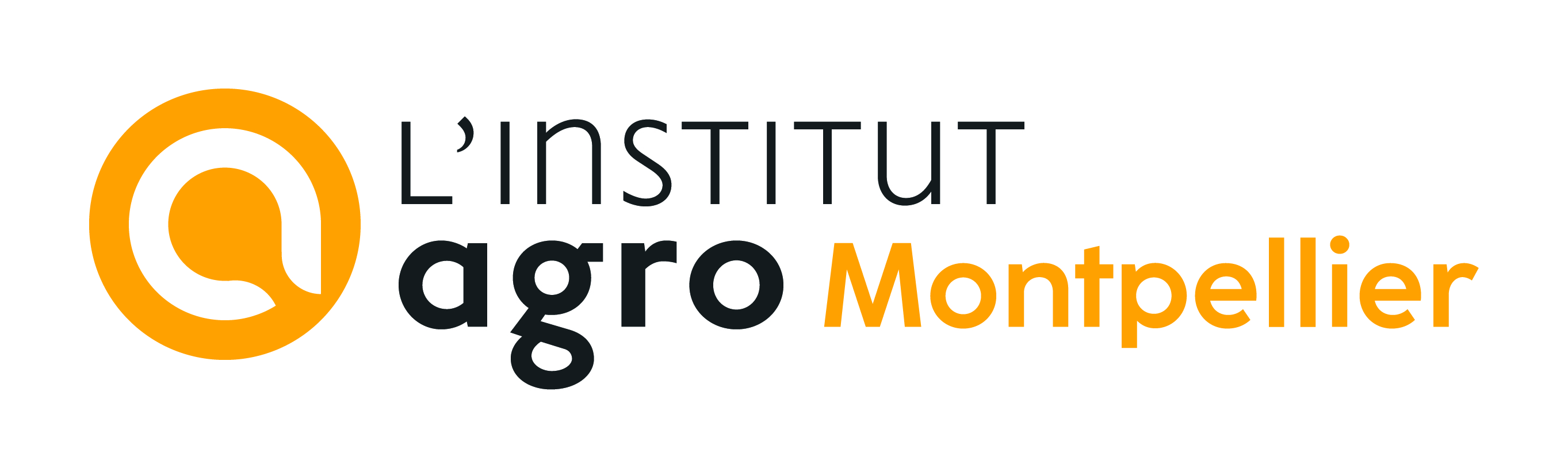
- Type: Grande école
- Established: 1848 (as Institut agricole de la Saulsaie); 2007 (as Montpellier SupAgro); 2020 (as Institut Agro Montpellier)
- Parent institution: L'Institut Agro
- Affiliations: Agropolis International, CGE, Agreenium, I-SITE MUSE
- Director: Carole Sinfort
- Academic staff: 230 (including teacher-researchers)
- Students: approx. 2,000
- Location: Montpellier, France; 43°37′06″N 3°51′22″E
- Campus: La Gaillarde, Lavalette, Florac
- Website: www.institut-agro-montpellier.fr

Institut Agro Montpellier (formerly Montpellier SupAgro until 2022) is a French public grande école specialising in agriculture, food science, and environmental science. Located in Montpellier, Occitania, it is one of the three schools of L'Institut Agro, alongside Institut Agro Rennes-Angers and Institut Agro Dijon.

The institution traces its origins to 1848 and is one of the oldest agricultural schools in France. It holds the status of grand établissement under the supervision of the French Ministry of Agriculture. It is accredited by the Commission des titres d'ingénieur (CTI) to award the diplôme d'ingénieur (Master's level).

The school operates three campuses in the Occitania and Lozère regions and manages two experimental agricultural estates. With a strong focus on Mediterranean and tropical agricultural systems, it hosts 22% international students and maintains academic partnerships in over 30 countries.

== History ==
=== Origins (1848–1906) ===
The history of the institution dates back to 1848, when the Institut agricole de la Saulsaie was founded by Césaire Nivière in Montluel, near Lyon. Nivière, inspired by agricultural techniques observed in Germany and England, established the school on his own land, specialising in wetland drainage techniques. The school was subsequently relocated to Montpellier.

The institution established itself on the Campus de La Gaillarde in 1871. During the late 19th century, the school became a major centre for viticulture research, particularly through the work of director Gustave Foëx (1881–1897), who created the school's vineyard in 1876 to test American rootstock resistance to phylloxera. At that time, Montpellier was widely recognised as the European centre of expertise on vine science.

=== École nationale supérieure agronomique de Montpellier (1906–2006) ===
In 1906, the school became the École nationale supérieure agronomique de Montpellier (ENSA-M), one of the leading French grandes écoles in agricultural sciences. Throughout the 20th century, it oriented its academic programmes around the crops and agricultural practices of Southern France, including vineyards, olive groves, fruit orchards, and livestock husbandry in challenging environments.

In the 1980s, the French government decided to relocate its tropical and Mediterranean research units to Montpellier, creating Agropolis International, of which the school was a founding member. The arrival of CIRAD, IRD, and the CIHEAM-IAMM institute significantly reinforced the Montpellier agricultural science cluster.

=== Montpellier SupAgro (2007–2019) ===
On 1 January 2007, Montpellier SupAgro (officially the Centre international d'études supérieures en sciences agronomiques) was created by decree of 13 December 2006. The new grand établissement resulted from the merger of four institutions:

- the École nationale supérieure agronomique de Montpellier (ENSA-M)
- the Centre national d'études agronomiques des régions chaudes (CNEARC)
- the Montpellier campus of the École nationale supérieure des industries agricoles et alimentaires (ENSIA-SIARC)
- the Centre d'expérimentation pédagogique de Florac (CEP)

In 2009, Montpellier SupAgro launched the first French university foundation in agricultural sciences, SupAgro Fondation (now L'Institut Agro Fondation). The same year, the institution was a founding member of Agreenium, the national consortium for research and education in agriculture, food, animal health and the environment.

In 2011, Montpellier SupAgro obtained the Labex Agro, one of the largest Laboratoires d'excellence nationwide, with a €25 million endowment within the Investissements d'avenir programme.

=== Institut Agro Montpellier (2020–present) ===
On 1 January 2020, Montpellier SupAgro merged with Agrocampus Ouest to form L'Institut Agro (officially the Institut national d'enseignement supérieur pour l'agriculture, l'alimentation et l'environnement), by decree of 26 December 2019. On 1 January 2022, AgroSup Dijon also joined the institute. The three schools then adopted a common naming convention while maintaining operational autonomy: Montpellier SupAgro became Institut Agro Montpellier.

== Campuses ==
Institut Agro Montpellier operates three campuses and two experimental agricultural estates.

=== La Gaillarde (Montpellier) ===
The main campus, La Gaillarde, has been the school's home since 1871. Covering 27 hectares near the Peyrou Royal Gardens and the historic centre of Montpellier, it houses modern teaching and research facilities, a 380-seat amphitheatre, student residences, catering services, and sports facilities. The central teaching buildings were built in 1995–1997 adjacent to the Château de la Gaillarde, a historic building fully renovated in 2001–2002.

La Gaillarde also hosts INRAE's Occitanie-Montpellier Centre (established on site in 1946) and more than twenty joint research units. The Pôle Vigne et Vin (Vine and Wine Centre), coordinating training, research and expertise across all three Institut Agro schools, is located on this campus.

=== Lavalette (Montpellier) ===
The Campus de Lavalette, on the northern outskirts of Montpellier, was progressively built on parcels of a former agricultural estate bequeathed to the city. It hosts numerous research and educational institutions including CIRAD, IRD, INRAE, CIHEAM-IAMM, AgroParisTech, the Maison de la Télédétection, and the headquarters of Agropolis International.

In 2012, the Consultative Group on International Agricultural Research (CGIAR) established its headquarters in Montpellier, further reinforcing the international status of the agricultural science hub. The Pôle Tropiques et Méditerranée (formerly the Institut des régions chaudes), which coordinates international cooperation activities, is based on this campus.

=== Florac ===
The Campus de Florac, located in Florac Trois Rivières in Lozère, sits within the Cévennes National Park, a UNESCO Biosphere Reserve. This campus serves as a field base for training and research on rural territorial dynamics, agro-environment and pastoralism. It also leads the Institut Agro's support mission for France's 800 vocational agricultural secondary schools (lycées agricoles).

=== Experimental estates ===
Institut Agro Montpellier manages two experimental agricultural estates:

- the Domaine du Merle in Salon-de-Provence, dedicated to sheep farming and olive cultivation
- the Domaine du Chapitre in Villeneuve-lès-Maguelone, dedicated to viticulture

These estates support research, development and training activities in partnership with agricultural professionals.

== Academics ==
Institut Agro Montpellier offers a broad range of programmes within the European LMD framework (bachelor's, master's, doctorate), including:

- Two diplôme d'ingénieur programmes (Master's level): Agricultural Sciences Engineering and Sustainable Agricultural and Food Systems for the South (SAADS)
- Several international master's programmes, including two Erasmus Mundus-labelled consortia
- The Diplôme national d'œnologue (DNO), a national oenology degree
- Licence professionnelle programmes, several of which are open to apprenticeship
- Doctoral training through the doctoral schools of the University of Montpellier

The engineering programme includes more than 66% women students. Approximately 22% of the student body is international, with 60% of international students coming from non-French-speaking countries.

== Research ==
The school's teacher-researchers are involved in 21 unités mixtes de recherche (joint research units, UMR) and 4 unités mixtes technologiques (UMT), working in close collaboration with major research organisations based in Montpellier: INRAE, CIRAD, IRD, and CNRS, as well as the University of Montpellier and Université Paul-Valéry Montpellier 3.

Key research areas include agroecology and food systems, plant adaptation to global change, biodiversity and evolution, viticulture and oenology, water management, remote sensing, and food safety.

Institut Agro Montpellier is a founding member of the Labex Agro (now succeeded by Programmes Thématiques Longs) and a partner of the I-SITE MUSE (Montpellier Université d'Excellence), led by the University of Montpellier. It also hosts the UNESCO Chair Alimentations du monde (World Food Systems), established in 2010.

Technology transfer and innovation are supported through AgroValoMéditerranée, a business incubation platform operated jointly with INRAE.

== Rankings and accreditations ==
As part of L'Institut Agro, the institution contributes to rankings published under the parent institution's name:

- Shanghai GRAS (2023): 21st worldwide in Agriculture, 15th in Ecology, 24th in Food Science and Technology
- THE (2024): top 400 worldwide in Life Sciences, 11th nationally

Institut Agro Montpellier holds the following accreditations and certifications:

- CTI accreditation for the diplôme d'ingénieur (audit December 2023)
- Hcéres evaluation
- Qualiopi certification (national quality label for training organisations)
- Bienvenue en France label (level 2) for international student welcome

== International partnerships ==
Institut Agro Montpellier has signed academic exchange agreements with institutions in over 20 countries and framework cooperation agreements in some 30 countries. It coordinates two international consortia supporting Erasmus Mundus-labelled master's programmes.

The institution is a founding member of Agropolis International, an association grouping over 100 research units and 2,200 researchers in agriculture, food, environment and biodiversity in the Montpellier area.

== Notable people ==
=== Alumni ===
- Pyotr Z. Bazhbeuk-Melikov (1872–1944), Bessarabian agronomist and politician
- Constantin Mimi (1868–1935), Bessarabian politician and winemaker

=== Faculty ===
- Gustave Foëx (1844–1906), viticulturist and school director, pioneer in phylloxera resistance research
- Pierre Galet (1921–2019), ampelographer

== See also ==
- Institut Agro
- Institut Agro Rennes-Angers
- Institut Agro Dijon
- Agropolis International
- University of Montpellier
