= John Parducci =

American winemaker

John Parducci (January 22, 1918-February 4, 2014) was an American winemaker. His father Adolph founded Parducci Wine Cellars in Ukiah in 1933, and John became lead winemaker in 1944. The Wine Spectator says he is primarily known for his red wine labels. In 1989, he received the World of Wine "Lifetime Achievement Award for Excellence in Winemaking." After being ousted from Parducci Wine Cellars in 1994 by the owners, in 1999 he founded McNab Ridge Winery near Ukiah.

== Early life and education ==
John Parducci was born on January 22, 1918 in Preston, California, in the same house his mother, Isabelle Katherine Lucchetti, had been born in. John was the oldest of four siblings, and his mother and father Adolph had three other sons as well: Dolph, George, and Vernon.

Their father Adolph Parducci had been born in California, then traveled when he was young to Italy, as his parents were from Tuscany. Adolph then spent his childhood tending vineyards in Chianti, before stowing away on a freighter as a teenager and returning to the United States. At 21, he rented a vineyard in Cloverdale, California, and married Isabella. Fire destroyed the Cloverdale operation in 1921, and Adolph purchased a 120-acre ranch north of Ukiah, California in Mendocino County.

Around 1927, the Parducci family moved to Ukiah, and John began learning grape growing from his father. In 1932, the brothers helped their father construct a winery in Ukiah. He graduated Ukiah High School in 1936 and majored in languages and chemistry at Santa Rosa Junior College.

== Career ==
=== Parducci Wine Cellars ===
He started making wine in 1932, before the end of Prohibition in the United States. In 1932, at age 14 he traveled alone to Hoboken, New Jersey to sell his family's grapes to home winemakers. He afterwards would travel frequently to sell the family's wine, but would return to Mendocino County in the fall for the harvest. He helped build the family's Parducci Wine Cellars, which according to New Times, was established as Mendocino's first commercial winery in 1933. The original winery was called Adolph B. Parducci and Son, then renamed Parducci Wine Cellars. The family built a small tasting cellar at their ranch, where everything was handbuilt by Adolph and the brothers. During harvest season, vineyard labor was provided by the Pomo people.

By 1938, John's wife Margarett Parducci established the first gift shop in the family cellar, and in the early 1940s, they began bottling their own wine. Beginning to work at the family winery in 1940, he became lead winemaker of Parducci Wine Cellars in 1944. The Fort Bragg Advocate-News stated he worked to improve quality, while making the wine "accessible and affordable." He was the first Mendocino County winemaker to put a varietal on the label. John and George took over operations from Adolph, investing in stainless steel tanks along with the traditional redwood and oak casks. John was making wine for Christian Brothers by the 1950s, with the wine he made delivered daily to Arcata and Cloverdale.

Parducci and his brothers in 1964 took over the winery operations, and became known for Mendocino wines such as Zinfandels, Petite Sirahs, and Cabernets. In 1972, hard times forced the family to sell the original winery. He sold most of his stake in Parducci Wine Cellars in 1973 when it was acquired by Teachers Management Corporation, an investment group in Newport Beach.

In 1987, he was named California Winemaker of the Year at the 1987 Los Angeles County Fair. At the time, the Parducci winery's national distributor was Brown-Forman of Louisville, Kentucky. In 1989, he received the World of Wine award "Lifetime Achievement Award for Excellence in Winemaking." In the early 1990s, Parducci Wine Cellars had a peak production of 500,000 cases a year.

=== Ownership lawsuits ===
John Parducci was fired by TMI in December 1994 as general manager and ousted from the winery. He sued the new corporate managers to prevent a 35-acre vineyard, which he stated had better-than-average grape yields, from being ripped out. The attempt failed in May, 1995, with Parducci still suing the other owners for mismanagement. It later went through a number of ownership changes.

=== McNab Ridge Winery ===
In 1999, he purchased the former Zellerbach Winery to found McNab Ridge Winery near Ukiah. At McNab Ridge, after its founding in 1999, John's grandson Rich Parducci became winemaker. In 2002, John was still working at the McNab winery. By 2007, McNab Ridge was part of a cooperative venture named Coro Mendocino, with a number of local wineries producing red blends under the Coro label, all with Mendocino-grown grapes. The Seattle Times referred to him as a "pioneering Mendocino winemaker" in 2008, at which point he still worked daily at McNab Ridge Winery.

In 2012, he was inducted into the Vintner's Hall of Fame. The Mendocino County Fair Wine Competition has a John Parducci Award for Best of Show red wine.

== Wines ==
Jim Laube, a Wine Spectator senior editor, wrote in 1999 that John Parducci "put Mendocino on the wine map, and his wines were Mendocino’s guinea pigs — experiments that tested, proved and disproved many theories about grape-growing and winemaking, and laying the foundation to modern-day thinking about what grows best where." He was a proponent of redwood barrels over oak, stating that while oak could dominate taste, "with redwood, when you opened the manhole in the old tanks it smelled like a bed of roses."

In March 1988, the Los Angeles Times reported that Parducci had 53 consecutive vintage harvests under his name. Vintages included Sauvignon Blanc, Chardonnay, Chenin Blanc, Gewurztraminer, Zinfandel, Cabernet Sauvignon, Merlot, Pinot Noir, Petite Sirah, and White Zinfandel. He was quoted at his 70th birthday stating "I don’t like to beat the grape to death or strip it of everything it has. Don’t ask me about the body, or the bouquet. Technical analysis is worthless. All that counts is that the wine pleases you, that you like it when you taste it."

== Personal life ==
In March 1937, he married Margarett Louise Romer, and they had a 70th anniversary in 2008. He and Margarett were supporters of the Grace Hudson Museum in Ukiah. In Ukiah, he was also president of the Ukiah Rotary Club, and past president of the Pomo Shrine Club. He was named Mendocino Agricultural Man of the Year. He died on February 4, 2014 at his home in Ukiah, at the age of 96. He was survived by his wife, his son William, brother Dolph, and six grandchildren.

In 2020, artist Lauren Sinnott included Parducci in a historical mural in downtown Ukiah, alongside winemakers Charlie Barra and Barney Fetzer. Parducci, shown using a microscope, is painted next to what he wrote about himself in the 1940 census: a 22-year-old man living in Ukiah and working as a wine chemist.

== See also ==
- List of wine professionals
- Big Valley District-Lake County AVA
- Upper Lake Valley AVA
