= Institut National d'Horticulture et de Paysage =

INHP
- Institut National d'Horticulture et de Paysage
- Active: 1997–2008
- Location: Angers, Pays de la Loire, France

Institut National d'Horticulture et de Paysage (INHP) was a French agricultural sciences school of university-level, grande école-type. Its name in English is the 'National Institute for Horticulture and Landscape Management'.

It was created in 1997 as the merger of:

- École nationale supérieure d'horticulture, located in Versailles.
- École nationale d'ingénieurs des travaux de l'horticulture et du paysage, located in Angers.

It delivered bachelor's degree and master's degree in agricultural sciences. It was well known in France for its horticulture training, as being the only French grande école specializing in horticultural engineering.

In 2008, the Institut National d'Horticulture et de Paysage merged with École nationale supérieure agronomique de Rennes to form Agrocampus Ouest.
