= Parducci Wine Cellars =

American winery

- Location: Ukiah, California, United States
- Founded: 1933
- Key people: Adolph Parducci (founder); John Parducci (former lead winemaker)
- Parent company: WarRoom Cellars

Parducci Wine Cellars is a winery and wine label based in Ukiah, California that was first founded in 1933. It was the first commercial winery in Mendocino County. The Parducci family lost control of the winery in 1994 to investors. It was sold by Carl Thoma, a venture capitalist, to the founders of the Mendocino Wine Company in 2004. The Parducci brand was acquired by WarRoom Cellars in October 2024.

== History ==
In 1932, the Parducci family constructed a winery in Ukiah, California. Adolph Parducci founded Parducci Wine Cellars in Ukiah in 1933, and his son John Parducci became lead winemaker in 1944. Parducci Wine Cellars was the first winery in Mendocino County.

John Parducci and his brothers in 1964 took over the winery operations, and became known for Mendocino wines such as Zinfandels, Petite Sirahs, and Cabernets. In 1972, hard times forced the family to sell the original winery. John Parducci sold most of his stake in 1973 when it was acquired by Teachers Management Corporation, an investment group in Newport Beach. John Parducci was named California Winemaker of the Year at the 1987 Los Angeles County Fair for his work with the winery. At the time, the Parducci winery's national distributor was Brown-Forman of Louisville, Kentucky.

In the early 1990s, Parducci Wine Cellars had a peak production of 500,000 cases a year. John Parducci was fired by TMI in December 1994 as general manager and ousted from the winery. He sued the new corporate managers to prevent a 35-acre vineyard, which he stated had better-than-average grape yields, from being ripped out. The attempt failed in May 1995, with Parducci still suing the other owners for mismanagement.

In 1999, Parducci Wine Cellars purchased Hidden Cellars Winery, which had been founded in 1981 by Dennis Patton. At the time, the Parducci winery produced around 270,000 cases each year under its own names, with a large variety mostly retailing for around $10 a bottle. Bob Swain was winemaker for the Parducci brand.

By 1999, Parducci Wine Cellars was owned by Carl Thoma, a venture capitalist. The Parducci winery was sold by Thoma in 2004 to the founders of the Mendocino Wine Company. The Parducci brand was acquired by WarRoom Cellars in October 2024.

== See also ==
- Mendocino County wine
- Clear Lake AVA
- McDowell Valley AVA
- Lake County wine
