= Agropolis International =

French educational association

Coordinates: 43°38′45″N 3°52′15″E

- Agropolis
- Motto: Science-Society Mediation
- Type: Association (1901 Law)
- Established: 1986
- President: Patrick Caron
- Director: Mélanie Broin
- Location: Montpellier, France
- Honorary Presidents: Louis Malassis (Founding President), Alfred-Philippe Conesa, Michel de Nucé de Lamothe, Gérard Matheron, Henri Carsalade, Bernard Hubert, Jean-Luc Khalfaoui
- Website: Agropolis International

Agropolis International, formerly called Agropolis, is an association that was founded in 1986 by Louis Malassis and research and higher education institutes.

== Publications ==
Agropolis International publishes directories of scientific competences with examples of research projects:

- Global health - People, animals, plants, the environment : towards an integrated approach to health (2019)
- Marine and coastal sciences in Occitanie (2019)
- Complex systems - From biology to landscapes (2019)
- Viticulture and Wine (October 2016)
- Climate change: impact and adaptation (February 2015)
- Family farming (February 2014)
- Green technologies (February 2013)
- Agronomy - Crops and cropping systems (July 2010)
- Water resources - Preservation and management (March 2012).
