= Institut Agro =

French agricultural institution

Coordinates: 48°51′46″N 2°16′55″E

- Institut national d'enseignement supérieur pour l'agriculture, l'alimentation et l'environnement
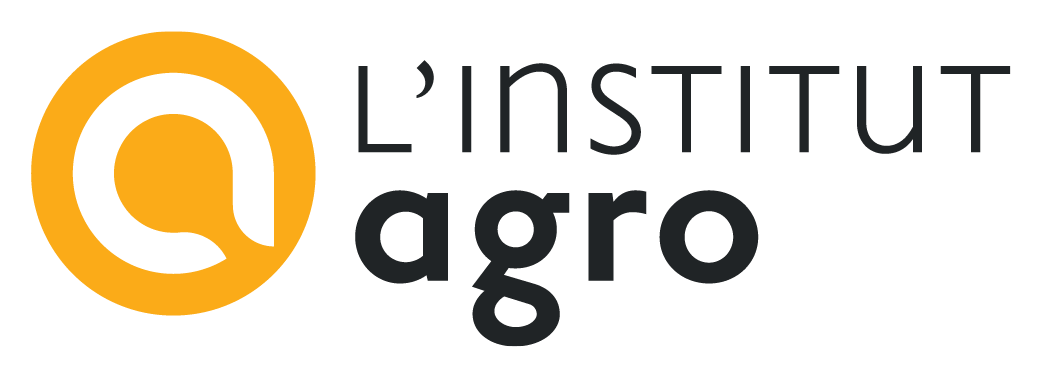
- Established: January 1, 2020
- President: Anne-Lucie Wack
- Location: France
- Website: institut-agro.fr/en

The Institut Agro or National Institute of Higher Education for Agriculture, Food and the Environment is a French public scientific, cultural and professional establishment (EPSCP), a Grands établissements created on January 1, 2020.

It is placed under the main supervision of the Ministry of Agriculture and the educational supervision of the Ministry of Higher Education. Its headquarters is in Paris at 42 rue Scheffer in the 16th arrondissement.

Since January 1, 2022, the establishment is made up of three schools: the Institut agro Montpellier, the Institut Agro Rennes-Angers and the Institut Agro Dijon.

Its three schools are among the 204 French engineering schools accredited as of September 1, 2020 to deliver an engineering diploma.

== History ==
The agro institute results from the grouping of several national higher agronomic schools with a historical existence.

In 2018, Montpellier SupAgro and Agrocampus Ouest (Rennes and Angers) announced their desire to regroup. On January 1, 2020, these two establishments merged to create the National Institute of Higher Education for Agriculture, Food and the Environment. On January 1, 2022, Agrosup Dijon was also integrated.

A merger project with AgroParisTech was also mentioned but this did not come to fruition.

Finally, in 2022, the schools adopt a common name while maintaining autonomous operation. Montpellier Supagro becomes the Montpellier Agro Institute, Agrocampus Ouest becomes the Rennes-Angers Agro Institute and Agrosup Dijon becomes the Dijon Agro Institute.

== Presentation ==
The Agro Institute was created with the objective of “leading agroecological, food, digital and climatic transitions” and developing the dissemination of Agroecology, particularly in agricultural high schools. These are the main common educational and research directions.

The Agro Institute is a large higher education establishment on a national scale because the sites are distributed in different locations. The institute has six campuses located in Rennes, Angers, Montpellier and Dijon. A campus is also located in Florac, in the Cévennes National Park, classified as a Biosphere Reserve by Unesco, it is a campus dedicated to the agro-environment. There are also two experimental agricultural estates in the Montpellier region: the Domaine du Merle located in Salon-de-Provence and the Domaine du Chapter located in Villeneuve-lès-Maguelone dedicated to viticulture. A distance learning center is located in Lempdes.

The establishment will have, in 2022: 4,500 students, 300 teacher-researchers, 39 research units and 187 international research partnerships.

== Ranking ==
In the field of agricultural sciences, the Agro Institute appears for the first time in the Shanghai ranking in 2020, in 28th place. In 2020, the U-Multirank ranking, initiated by the European Commission, awards the maximum score of 100/100, placing it in first place among French engineering schools.

According to the 2020 ranking of major engineering schools published by l'Étudiant magazine, AgroCampus Ouest is in 52nd position for all 205 French engineering schools, and Montpellier Sup Agro is in 57th position.

Nom	2019 (Rang)	2020 (Rang)
L’Étudiant		52 (AgroCampus Ouest); 57 (Montpellier Sup Agro)
Daur Rankings	24 (Montpellier)	25 (Montpellier); 39 (AgroCampus Ouest)
Shanghai Ranking, sciences agricoles		28e mondial (Institut Agro)
U-Multirank		1er (Institut Agro)
