= Institut Agro Rennes-Angers =

French agri-science, horticulture and landscape college

Institut Agro Rennes-Angers (Agrocampus Ouest)
- Institut supérieur des sciences agronomiques, agroalimentaires, horticoles et du paysage
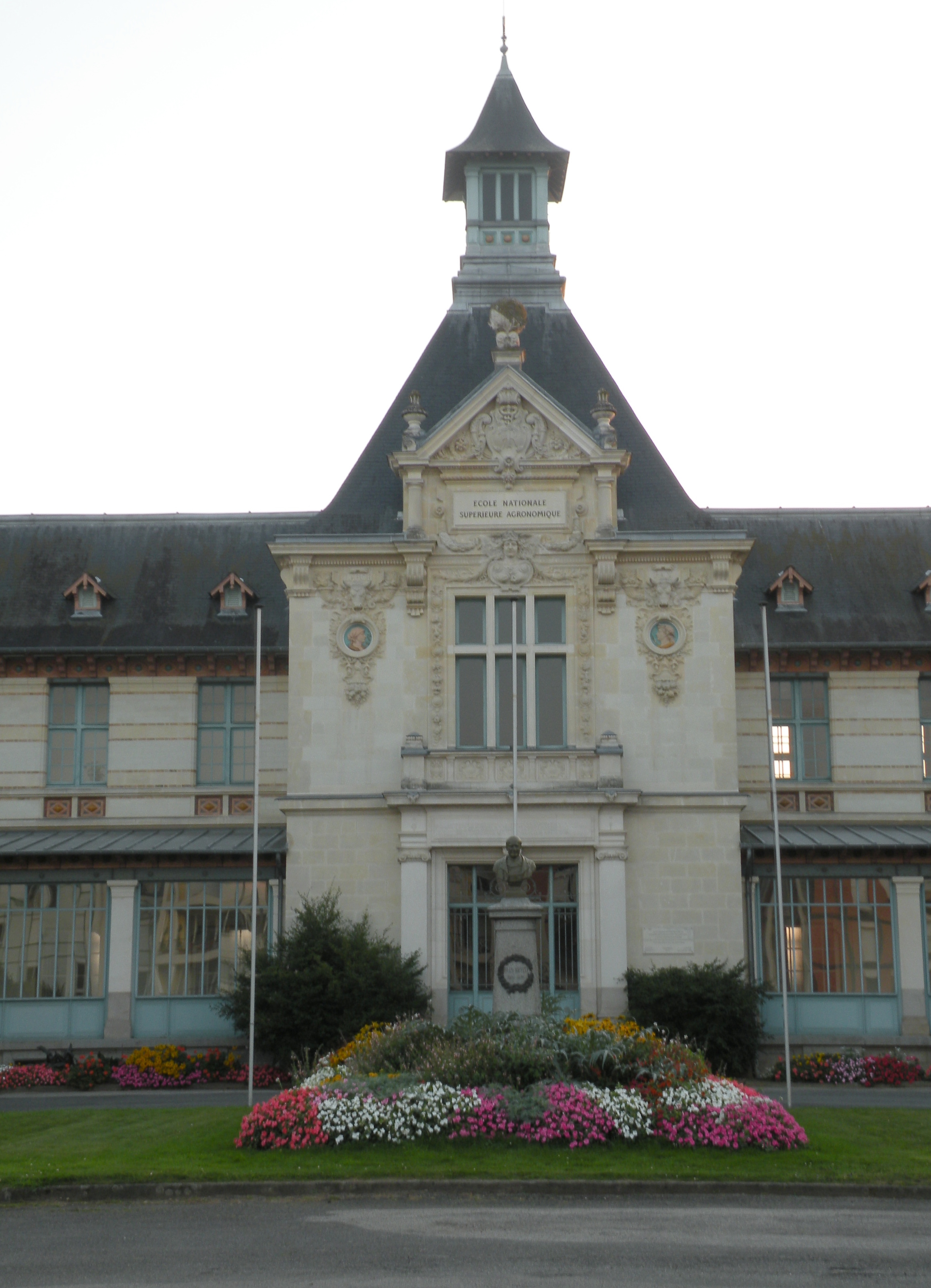
- Main building in the campus of Rennes
- Type: Grande école
- Established: 2008 (merger of two grandes écoles)
- Academic affiliations: CGE, CDEFI, European University of Brittany, Université Nantes Angers Le Mans
- President: Dominique Chargé
- Academic staff: 150 teachers including 130 professors/teachers
- Administrative staff: 322
- Students: 1,950, including 120 PhD students
- Location: Campuses in Rennes and Angers, (respectively in Brittany and Pays de la Loire), France; 48.1135°N 1.7064°W
- Website: https://international.institut-agro-rennes-angers.fr/

Institut Agro Rennes-Angers (previously named as Agrocampus Ouest till 2020) is a French higher education institution, known as a grande école. Its official name is Institut supérieur des sciences agronomiques, agroalimentaires, horticoles et du paysage (English: Higher Institute for agricultural sciences, food industry, horticulture and landscape management). It operates under the supervision of the French Ministry of Agriculture. It belongs to the Institut Agro, along with Institut agro Montpellier and Institut Agro Dijon.

It trains agricultural sciences engineers and research scientists. It has two campuses in western France, one in Rennes and the other in Angers.

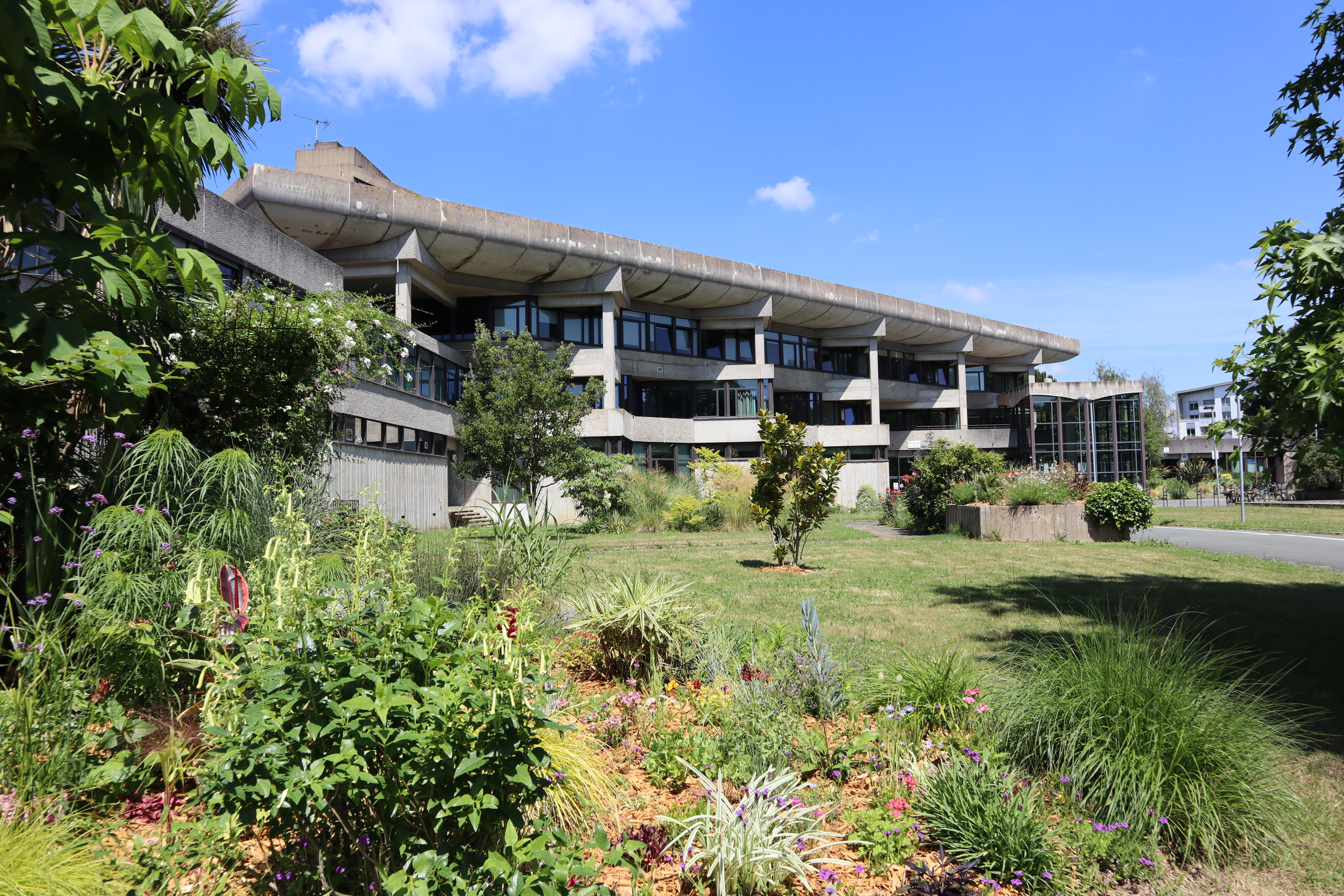
Campus in Angers

== History ==
Agrocampus Ouest was created in 2008, as the merger of two institutions:

- Institut National d'Horticulture et de Paysage in Angers.
- Agrocampus Rennes in Rennes.

Its head office is located in Rennes, and has a second campus in Angers.

== Education programmes ==
Agrocampus Ouest mainly trains engineers (Msc level), 4 specializations being available:

- agricultural sciences engineer
- horticulture sciences engineer
- landscape sciences engineer
- food industry sciences engineer

Depending on the chosen specialization, trainings are held in one or the other campus. Agrocampus Ouest also offers 16 Master's degrees and 9 Bachelor's degrees in life sciences.

Moreover, Agrocampus Ouest has 6 doctoral schools:

- Life-Agro-Health (VAS: Vie-Agro-Santé)
- Plants, environment, health (VESAM: Végétal, environnement, santé, Anjou-Maine)
- Materials science (SDLM: Sciences de la matière)
- Human sciences, organizations and society (SHOS: Sciences humaines, organisation et société)
- Mathematics, telecommunications, informatics, signal, systems, electronics (Matisse: Mathématiques, télécommunications, informatique, signal, systèmes, électronique)
- Law, economy, management, environment, society and territories (DEGEST: Droit, économie, gestion, environnement, société et territoires)

The institution has 80 academic partnerships across the world.

== Research programmes ==
According to its website, Agrocampus Ouest has:

- 14 research units, generally in partnership with the INRA research institute
- 398 associated researchers.

== Rankings ==
According to the 2011 ranking published by the L'Etudiant and L'Expansion, Agrocampus Ouest is the third French grande école for agricultural sciences, with ENSA de Toulouse.

== See also ==
List of agricultural universities
