= Preston, California =

Unincorporated community in California, United States

- Unincorporated community
- Location within California Location within the United States
- Coordinates: 38°50′07″N 123°01′03″W
- Country: United States
- State: California
- County: Sonoma
- Elevation: 341 ft (104 m)
- Time zone: UTC-8 (Pacific (PST))
  - Summer (DST): UTC-7 (PDT)
- Area code: 707
- GNIS feature ID: 1656233

Preston is an unincorporated community in Sonoma County, California, United States. The community is on U.S. Route 101, 2 miles (3.2 km) north of Cloverdale.

== History ==
Preston derives its name from Madame Emily Preston (née Burke), a faith healer who established a religious colony and health resort at her husband's ranch in 1875. Revenue from Preston's ministry and the settlement of followers in the area led to the construction of a church, railroad depot, post office, and a commercial district on both sides of the Russian River. The community began a slow decline after Preston's death in 1909, continuing to hold services into the 1940s.

Most of the buildings associated with the Preston community were destroyed in a wildfire in 1988.
