= Institut Agro Dijon =

Engineering college in Dijon, France

Coordinates: 47.3111°N 5.0659°E

The Institut Agro Dijon is a French grande école located in Dijon, France. The institute specialises in agriculture, food science and environmental science.

== History ==
The school traces its back to the 1960s. In 2009, the National Higher Institute of Agronomic, Food and Environmental Sciences (AgroSup Dijon) was created by the merger of National Higher School of Biology Applied to Nutrition and Food (ENSBANA) and National Establishment of Higher Agronomic Education of Dijon (ENESAD).

In 2022, the AgroSup Dijon was renamed the Institut Agro Dijon. It is a part of the Institut Agro, along with Institut Agro Rennes-Angers and Institut agro Montpellier.

== Curriculum ==
- Chemistry, Biochemistry
- Food Technology and Food Processing
- Sensory Analysis
- Nutrition
- Microbiology and Biotechnology
- Food Safety, Hygiene, Toxicology and Quality Assurance
- Applied Mathematics, Economics, Foreign Languages
