= Pierre Viala =

French scientist (1859–1936)

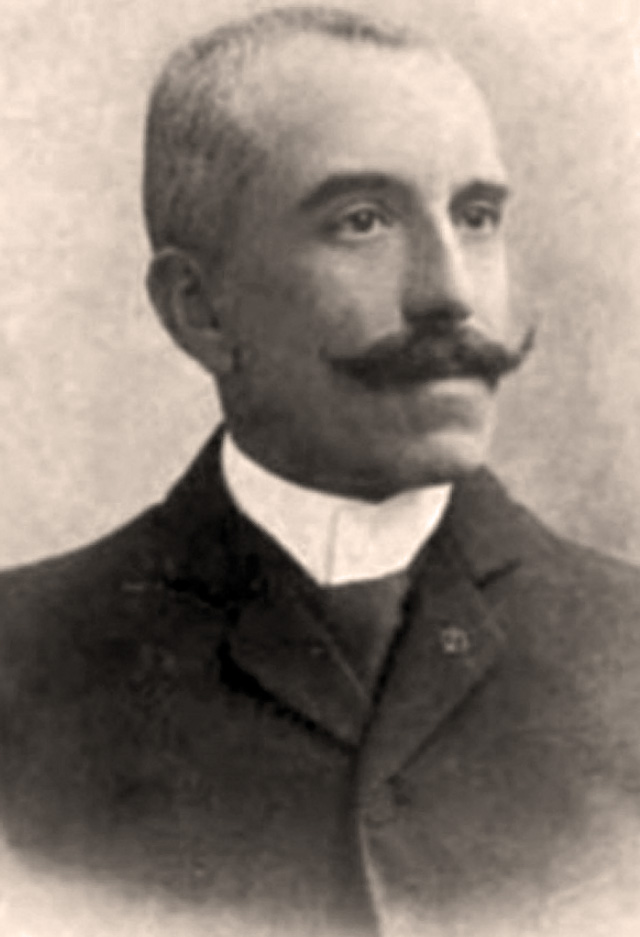
Pierre Viala

Pierre Viala (24 September 1859 in Lavérune – 11 February 1936) was a French scientist.

In 1901–1910 he and Victor Vermorel published Ampélographie. Traité général de viticulture, a seven-volume ampelography of 3,200 pages describing 5,200 grape varieties.

He has been honoured in the naming of 2 taxa of fungi; Vialaea by Pier Andrea Saccardo in 1896 (Vialaeaceae family) Vialina by Mario Curzi in 1935, which is now a synonym of Phoma Sacc., 1880.
