= Pierre Galet =

French ampelographer and author (1921–2019)

Pierre Galet (28 January 1921 – 30 December 2019) was a French ampelographer and author who was an influential figure within ampelography in the 20th century and before DNA typing was widely introduced. Beginning in the 1950s, Pierre Galet introduced a system for identifying varieties based on the shape, contours and characteristics of the leaves of the vines, petioles, growing shoots, shoot tips, grape clusters, as well as the colour, size, seed content and flavour of the grapes. The impact and comprehensiveness of his work earned him the consideration as the "father of modern ampelography". He started publishing within ampelography in the 1950s and his Ph.D. thesis was presented in 1967. He has also written popular science books on grape varieties. Galet was active at the École Nationale Supérieure Agronomique de Montpellier (today L'Institut Agro Montpellier).

== Biography ==
Pierre Galet was born in Monaco in 1921 and spent most his life in southern France. During World War II, Galet hid from the German authorities at the École Nationale Supérieure Agronomique de Montpellier. There he spent extensive amounts of time among the Department of Viticulture's Vitis collection which included samples of grapevines from across the globe. While there he was able to study the differences and learn about the different varieties.

After the war, Galet would accept a teaching position at the École Nationale Supérieure Agronomique de Montpellier where from 1946-1989, he was at the forefront of advances in ampelography and was the mentor to several of the leading ampelographers of the late 20th century. Among his students was Paul Truel, who would categorize and identify several wine grapes varieties in Australia and Portugal. In addition to teaching, Galet traveled to wine regions in the United States, South America, Cyprus, North Africa, Asia and throughout Europe identifying grape varieties and settling legal disputes involving them.

One such legal dispute involved the European Union regulations banning the use of American Vitis Labrusca vines, such as Isabella and Noah, in European vineyards. Galet has long been an advocate against forcing the mandatory uprooting of these vines, believing the ban is anachronistic.

== Discoveries and findings ==
Through the course of his work, Galet has identified over 100 distinct grape varieties belonging to the Pinot family. He has also identified vines across the globe that were mistakenly thought to be Pinot, long before DNA fingerprinting was widely used. One such occurrence happened in California in the 1980s when Galet discovered that vines labeled Pinot blanc were actually Melon de Bourgogne, a grape commonly associated with the Muscadet wines of the Loire Valley. These so-called "Pinot blanc" cuttings were provided by the University of California, Davis who mislabeled them. For more on this error, see also "Melon de Bourgogne - History" at MelonDeBourgogne.com.

== Writings ==
Between 1956 and 1964, Galet published Cépages et vignoble de France, a four volume catalog of French wine grape varieties. In 1977 and 1982, his two volume work, Maladies et parasites de la vigne, on various ailments and grape diseases was released and followed by the fifth edition of his handbook Précis de viticulture in 1988. In 2000, Galet released Dictionnaire encyclopédique des cépages, a comprehensive catalog of grape varieties from across the globe including their international synonyms. His student, ampelographer Lucie Morton, was influential in having much of Galet's work translated into English.

== Death and recognition ==
Galet died on 31 December 2019 at the age of 98.

For his work in the advancement of viticulture and ampelography, Galet was made an Officier de l'Ordre du Mérite Agricole. In 1983, he was given a prize of special recognition by the L'Office national interprofessionnel des vins (OIV), the association of French vintners, for the collective body of his work.
