= Institut national agronomique Paris Grignon =

Institut National Agronomique Paris-Grignon
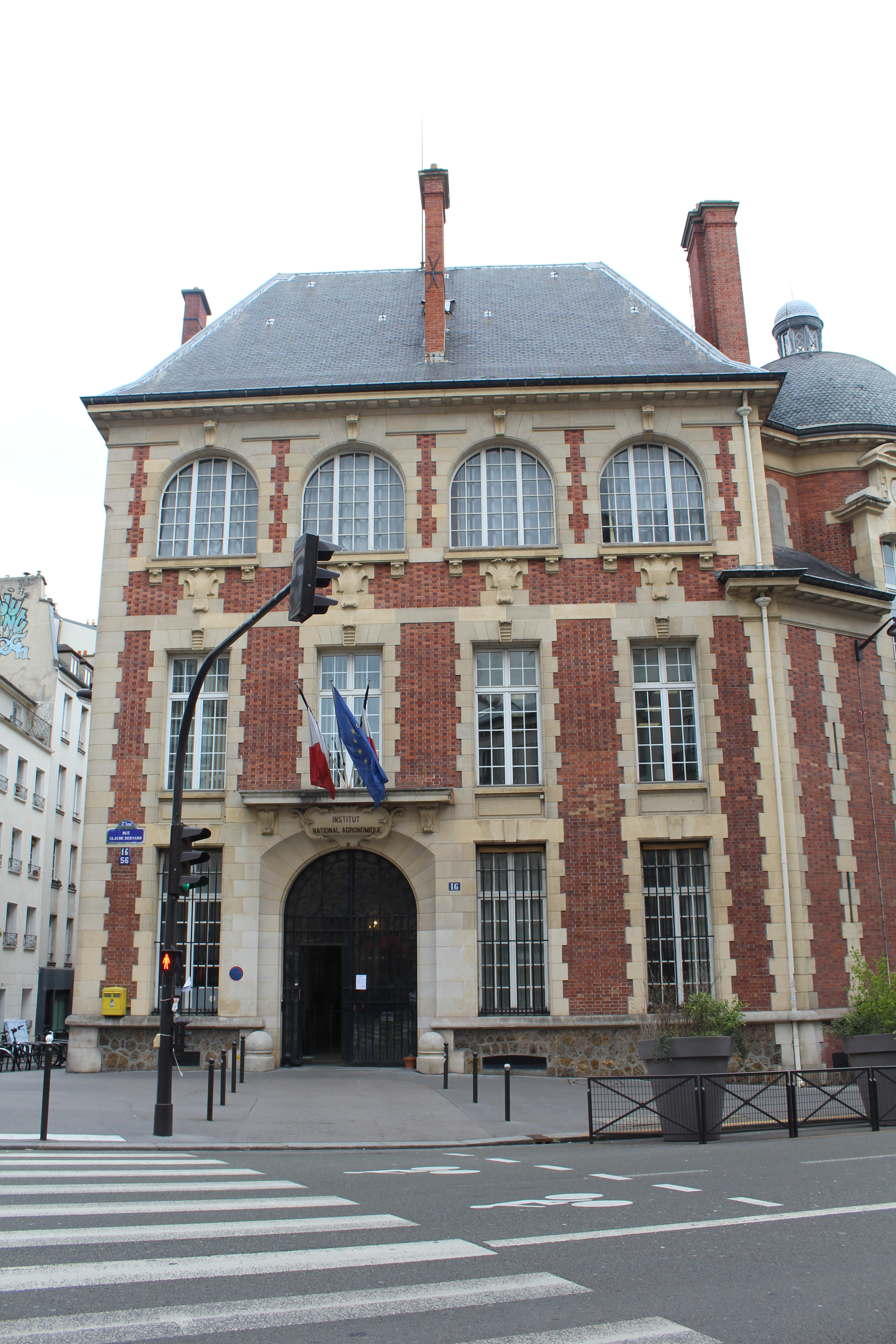
- Active: 1826–2007
- Parent institution: AgroParisTech
- Location: Paris and Thiverval-Grignon, Île-de-France, France
- Website: www.inapg.fr

The Institut National Agronomique Paris-Grignon (French pronunciation: [ɛ̃stity nɑsjɔnal aɡʁɔnɔmik paʁi ɡʁiɲɔ̃]; INA P-G) was a French university-level institution of grande école-type. It offered master's degree in agricultural- and life sciences. It was created in 1971 by merging the Institut national agronomique (Paris) and the École nationale supérieure d'Agronomie de Grignon, thus having a history that goes back to 1826.

INA P-G disappeared as an administrative entity on 1 January 2007, along with ENSIA and ENGREF, to create AgroParisTech.

== Points of interest ==
- Arboretum de Grignon
- Jardin botanique de l'Institut National

== History ==
The Institut national agronomique Paris Grignon results from the merger, in 1971, of the National Agronomic Institute of Paris and the National School of Agronomy of Grignon. The Institute became “AgroParisTech” in 2007.

The National Agronomic School of Grignon is a school founded in 1826 which was successively a royal institution for agriculture, a regional school of agriculture, then a national school of agronomy. The vocation has remained unchanged: to train specialists in agricultural sciences. The diploma it issues was granted the title of engineer in 1908. The school was then integrated into the National Agronomic Institute Paris-Grignon (INA P-G) in 1971. This is the oldest French agronomy school.
