= Boulevard Saint-Germain =

Boulevard in Paris, France

Coordinates: 48°51′10.70″N 2°20′10.70″E

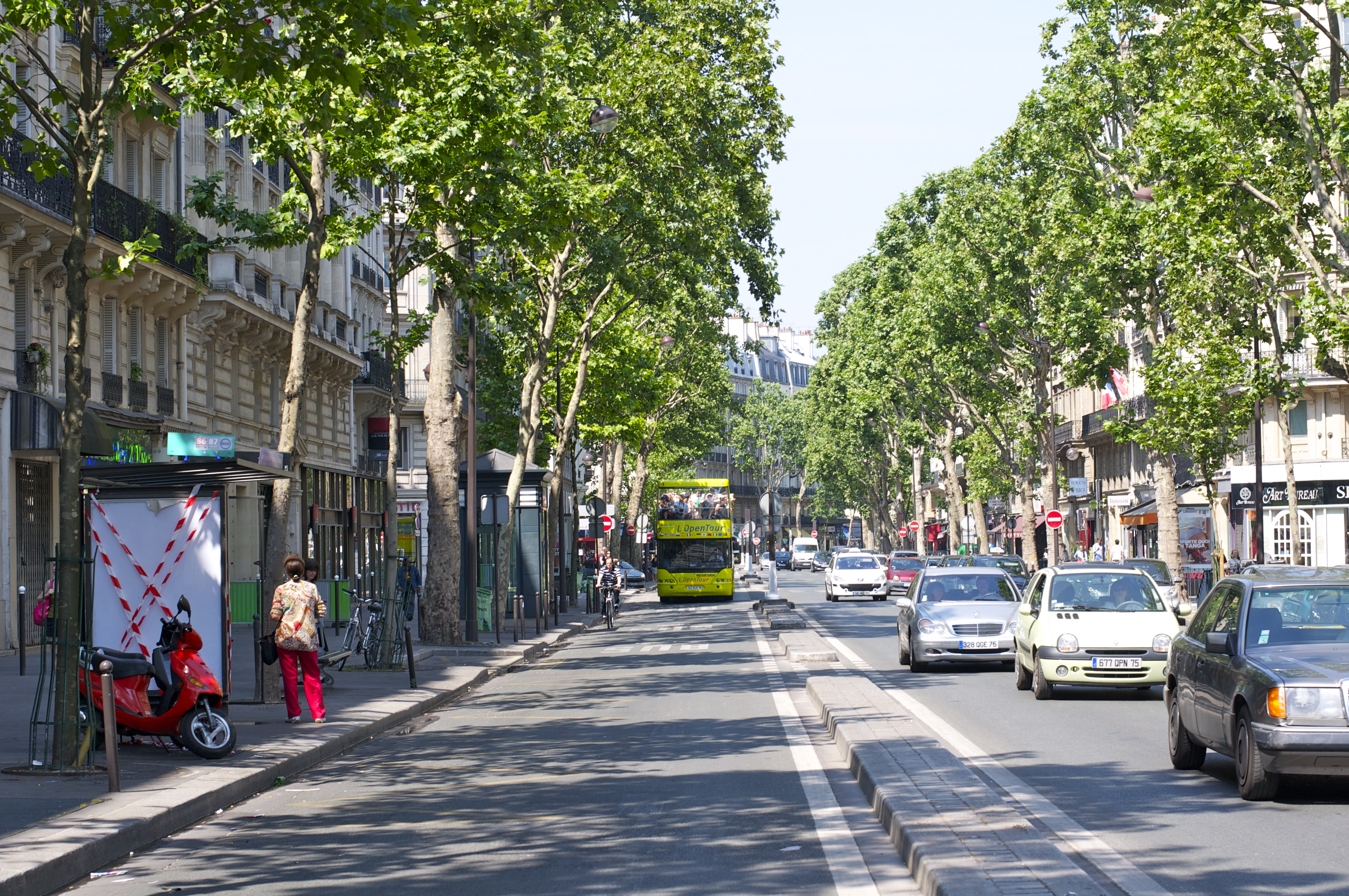
Boulevard Saint-Germain in the 5th arrondissement

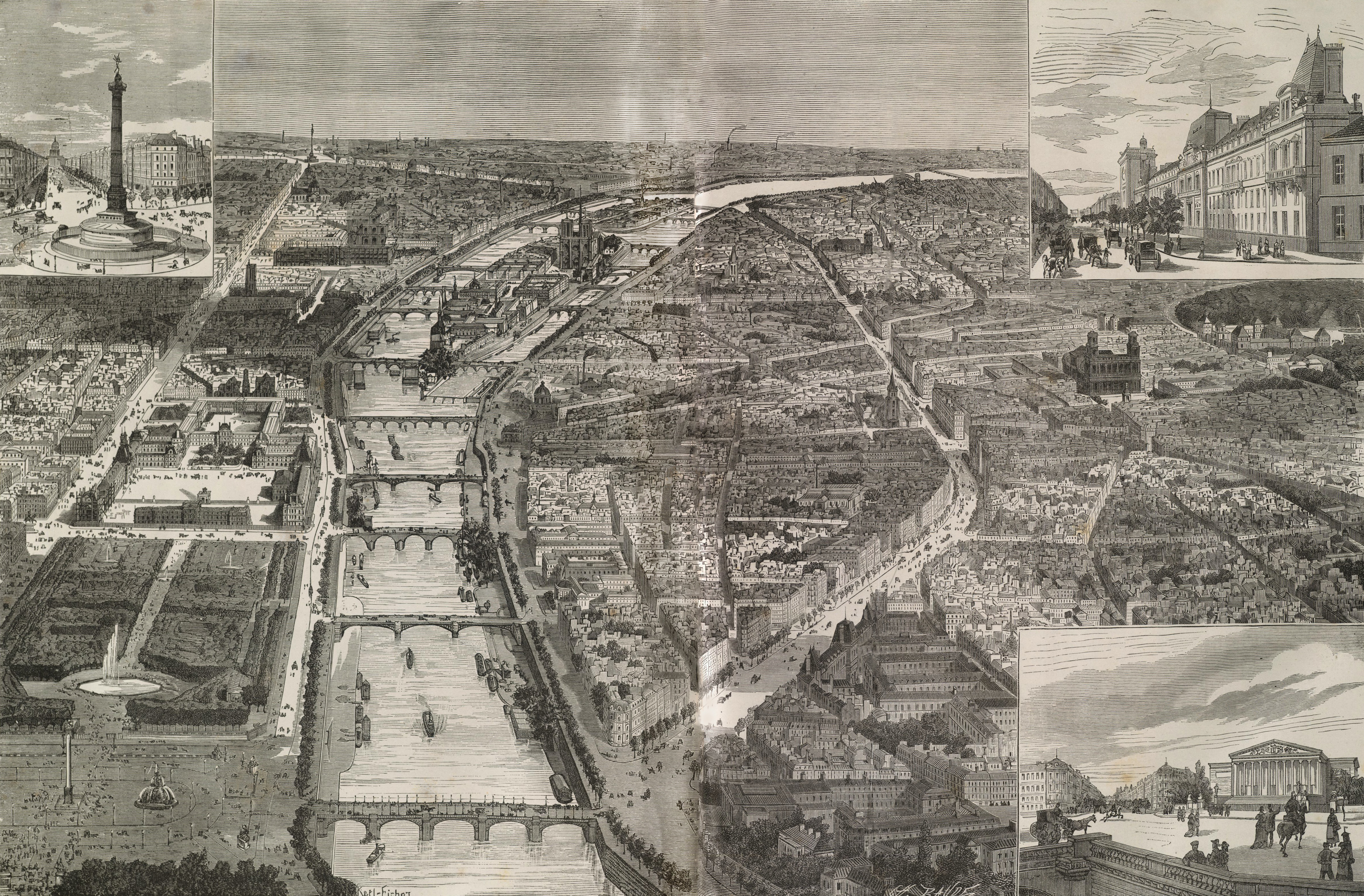
Bird's-eye view of Paris (1878) with the new Boulevard Saint-Germain on the right

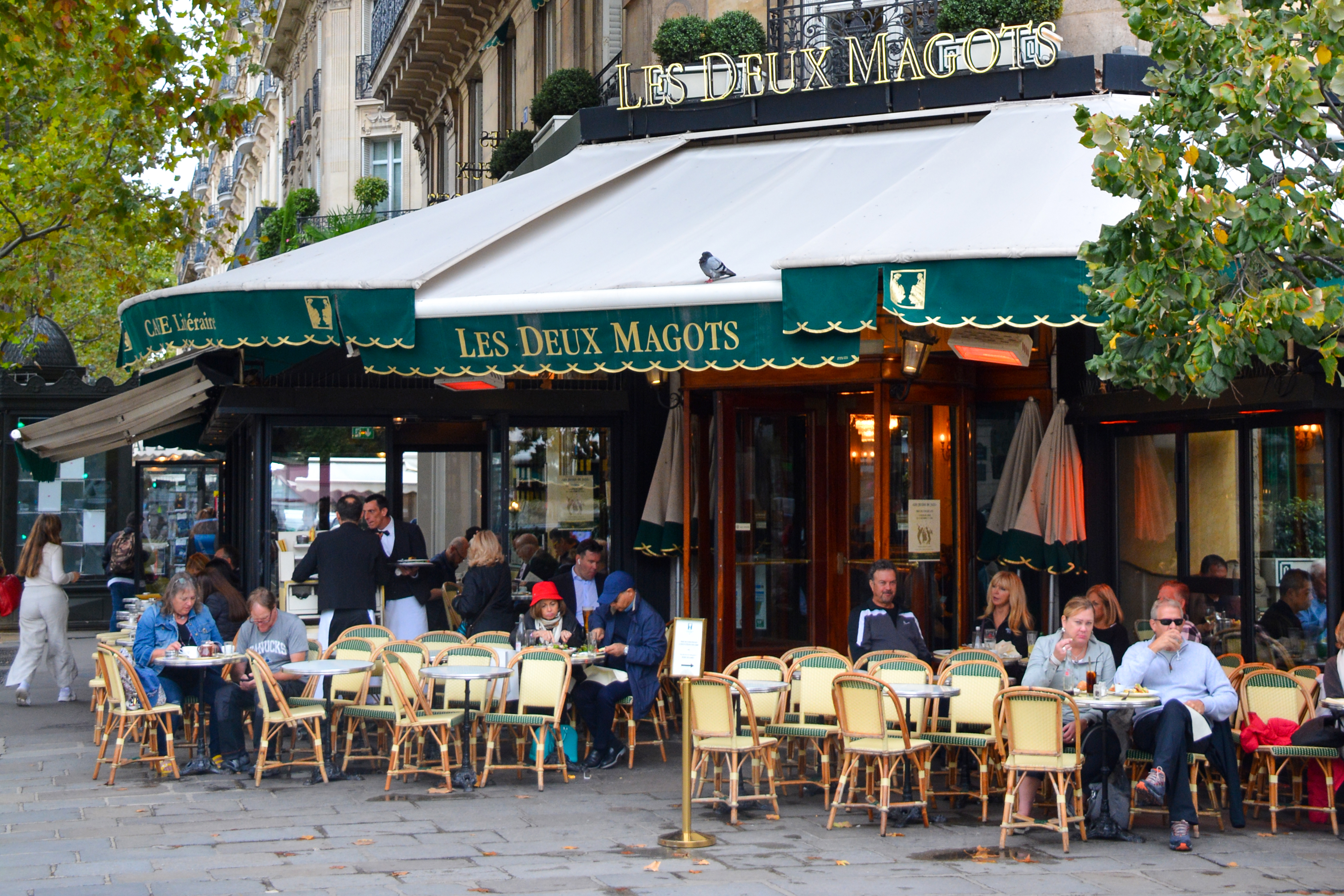
Les Deux Magots

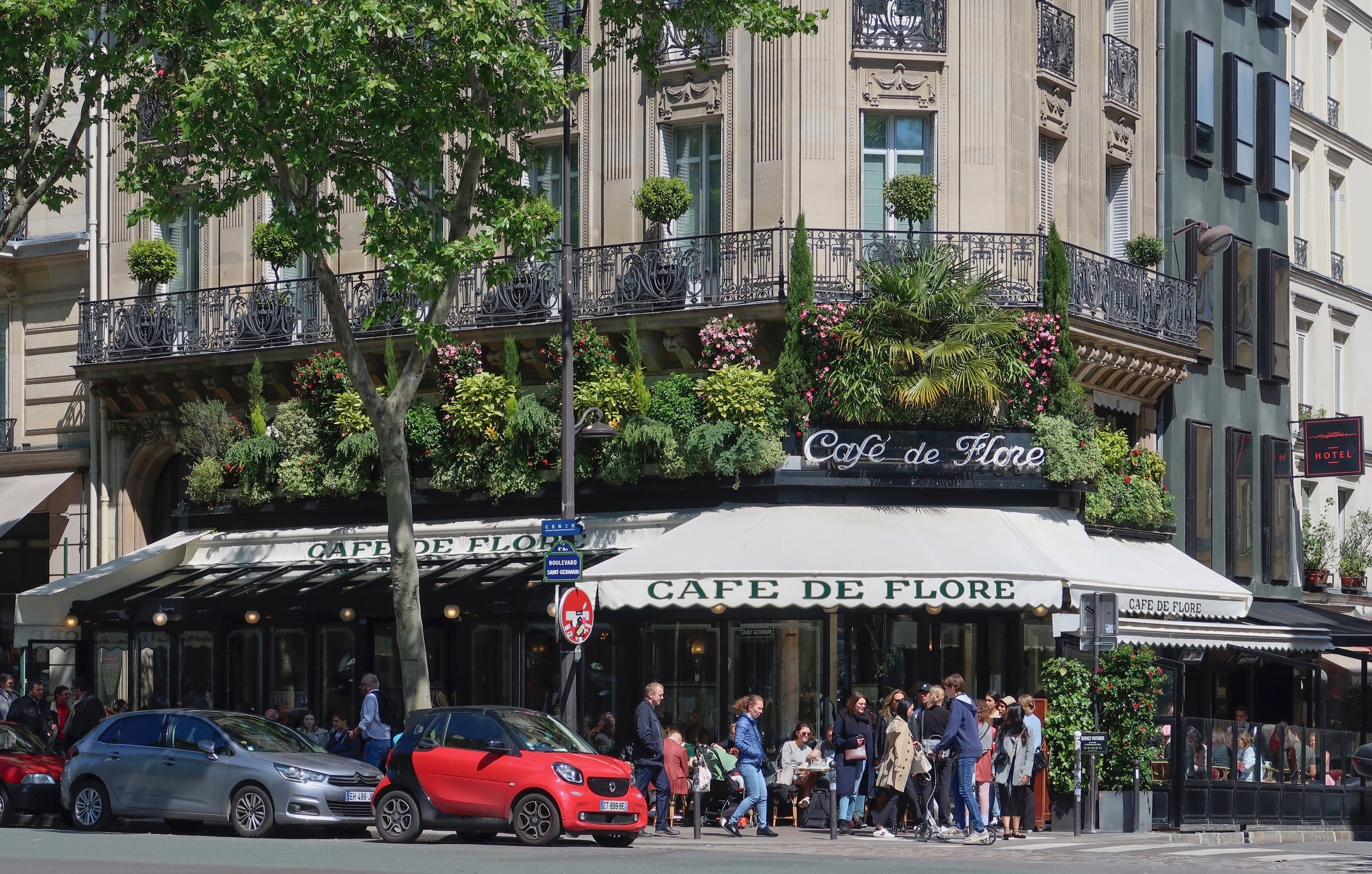
Café de Flore

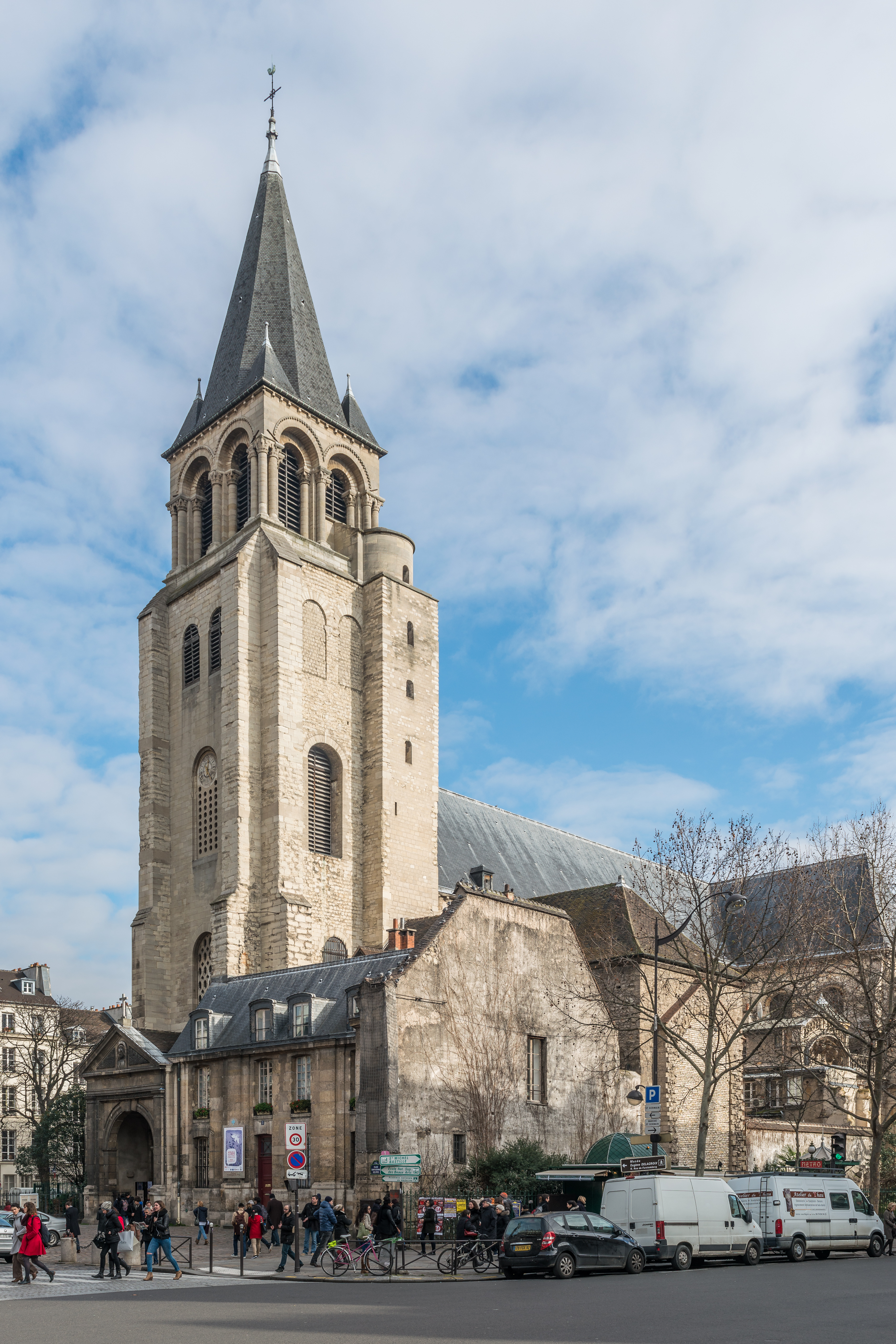
Saint-Germain-des-Prés Abbey Church with the bell tower

The Boulevard Saint-Germain (French pronunciation: [bulvaʁ sɛ̃ ʒɛʁmɛ̃]) is a major street in Paris on the Rive Gauche of the Seine.

It curves in a 3.5-kilometre (2.1 miles) arc from the Pont de Sully in the east (the bridge at the edge of Île Saint-Louis) to the Pont de la Concorde (the bridge to the Place de la Concorde) in the west and traverses the 5th, 6th and 7th arrondissements. At its midpoint, the boulevard is traversed by the north-south Boulevard Saint-Michel. The boulevard is most famous for crossing the Saint-Germain-des-Prés quarter from which it derives its name.

== History ==
The Boulevard Saint-Germain was the most important part of Haussmann's renovation of Paris (1850s and '60s) on the Left Bank. The boulevard replaced numerous small streets which approximated its path, including, from west to east (to the current Boulevard Saint-Michel), the Rue Saint-Dominique, Rue Taranne, Rue Sainte-Marguerite, Rue des Boucheries and Rue des Cordeliers. One landmark removed to make way for the project was the prison of the Abbey of Saint-Germain-des-Prés which stood entirely on what is now the boulevard, just west of what is now the Passage de la Petite Boucherie.

The boulevard derives its name from the church of Saint-Germain-des-Prés which dates back to the Middle Ages. This area around the boulevard is also referred to as the Faubourg ("Suburb") Saint-Germain which developed around the abbey.

In the 17th century, the Saint-Germain quarter became a major site for noble town houses, or hôtels particuliers. This reputation continued throughout the 19th century, where the old aristocracy of the Saint-Germain quarter is frequently contrasted with the new upper bourgeoisie of the Right Bank, having their homes on the Boulevard Saint-Honoré or on the Champs-Élysées (as noted, for example, in the novels of Honoré de Balzac and Marcel Proust).

From 1908 to the outbreak of World War II, number 195 was the headquarter of the Office international d'hygiène publique, ancestor of the WHO.

From the 1930s on, Saint-Germain has been associated with its nightlife, cafés and students (the boulevard traverses the Latin Quarter). Home to a number of famous cafés, such as Les Deux Magots and Café de Flore, the Saint-Germain quarter was the centre of the existentialism movement best associated with Jean-Paul Sartre and Simone de Beauvoir. On 27 March 2000, this was commemorated by the city of Paris which renamed the area in front of the Saint-Germain Church, at the intersection of the Boulevard Saint-Germain and Rue Bonaparte, the Place Jean-Paul Sartre et Simone de Beauvoir.

After the Second World War, the Boulevard Saint-Germain became the intellectual and cultural site for Parisian life. Philosophers, authors and musicians filled the night clubs and brasseries that line the boulevard.

The boulevard today is a thriving high-end shopping street with stores from Armani to Rykiel. The cafes continue to be sites for intellectual and political gatherings and the nightlife continues to thrive. Nearby is the Institut d'études politiques ("Sciences Po") and the College des Ingenieurs.

== Noted addresses ==
At 184 Boulevard Saint-Germain is the Société de Géographie, the world's oldest geographical society, founded in 1821 by von Humboldt, Chateaubriand, Dumont d’Urville, Champollion among others. It has had its headquarters here since 1878. The entrance is marked by two gigantic caryatids representing Land and Sea. It was here, in 1879, that the construction of the Panama Canal was decided. Nowadays the building accommodates Ipag - école supérieure de commerce.

== Vestiges of former streets ==
Some vestiges of the streets removed to make way for the Boulevard still remain today. There are still a few sections of original streets, e.g., the current Rue Gozlin, part of the former Rue Sainte-Marguerite, which now consists of a single very short city block between the Place du Quebec (at the Rue Bonaparte) and the Rue des Ciseaux.

As well, parts of original streets have more or less been maintained in their original state, but incorporated into the boulevard as short narrow sections separated from the main boulevard by a traffic island. For example, there is the south side of the boulevard at the Place Henri Mondor, south of the Odeon Metro station, which is the former Rue des Cordeliers (later renamed Rue de l'Ecole de Médecine) and an extension of the current Rue de L'Ecole de Médecine, but is now considered as being the Boulevard Saint-Germain. Another example is the south side of the boulevard just east of the Rue des Ciseaux, which extends the current Rue Gozlin, formerly Rue Sainte-Marguerite. The north side of the Rue Gozlin and this short section extending it represent exactly how much further south the abbey extended before the creation of the Boulevard Saint-Germain.

In some sections of the boulevard, a side of the former street was preserved and the buildings are much older than the Haussmannian facades that comprise most of the rest of the buildings on the boulevard. For example, the buildings on the north side of the boulevard between the Rue de Buci and the Rue de Seine are the original north side the former Rue des Boucheries (renamed Rue de l'Ecole de Médecine in 1846).

At 175 Boulevard Saint-Germain at the corner of the Rue des Saint-Peres stands a building originally built in 1678 and still bearing the street sign for the Rue Taranne.
