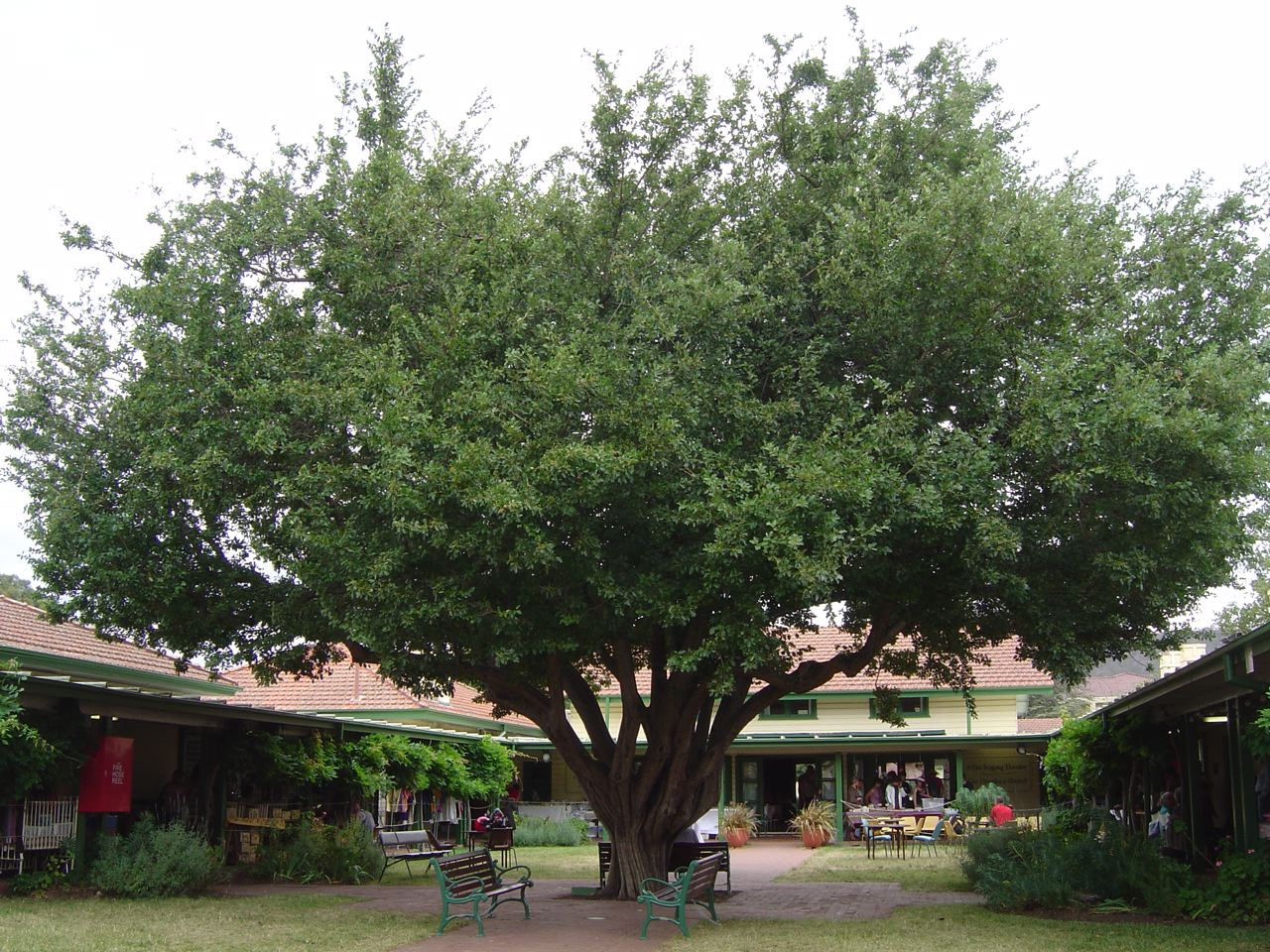

Scientific classification
- Kingdom: Plantae
- Clade: Tracheophytes
- Clade: Angiosperms
- Clade: Eudicots
- Clade: Rosids
- Order: Rosales
- Family: Rosaceae
- Genus: Crataegus
- Species: C. × grignonensis

Binomial name
- Crataegus × grignonensis Mouill.

= Crataegus × grignonensis =

Species of hawthorn

Crataegus × grignonensis sometimes spelled grignoniensis, is a hybrid hawthorn commonly known as "Grignon hawthorn". The hybrid originated as a seedling of Crataegus mexicana. It is an excellent small ornamental tree up to about 5 meters in height, with deep red fruit that contain 1 or 2 pyrenes.

== Ancestry ==
An atypical seedling from C. mexicana (which is often referred to by the illegitimate name Crataegus pubescens Steud.) appeared in 1873 among plants being cultivated at the Arboretum de Grignon, France. The male parent was thought at the time to be C. crus-galli, but that parentage produced C. x lavalleei, which looks quite different. It is thought to be more likely that the pollen parent was C. monogyna.

== Taxonomy ==
The Latin binomial Crataegus × grignonensis (or equivalently Crataegus grignonensis) was published in 1890 on the basis of a description written by Pierre Mouillefert, who was the professor of sylviculture at l'École nationale d'Agriculture de Grignon.
