= Collège des Ingénieurs =

Coordinates: 48.8570°N 2.3245°E

- Motto: qui agit intellegit (Latin)
- Motto in English: Learning Through Action
- Type: Private
- Established: 1986
- President: Philippe Mahrer
- Location: Paris, Munich, Turin, France, Germany, Italy
- Website: http://www.cdi.eu/
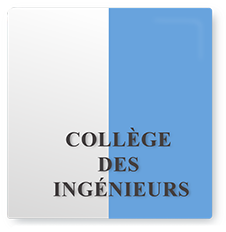
- The Collège des Ingénieurs Logo

The Collège des Ingénieurs (French pronunciation: [kɔlɛʒ dez‿ɛ̃ʒenjœʁ], CDI) is an independent international educational institution founded in Paris, France in 1986 and known for its postgraduate management training (MBA, Master of Business Administration). The training model is innovative for management training, it is exclusively aimed at engineers and scientists, directly following scientific education.

The aim of the Collège is to train graduates to combine scientific thinking with entrepreneurial action. The 10-month programme is about understanding economic and entrepreneurial contexts in order to be prepared for a management career.

In addition, the focus is on the personal development of the European graduates.

Theory and practical experience are structured according to an integrated dual model. The training is free of tuition fees. All accepted graduates are financed and supported by the CDI.

Admission to the Collège is based on a rigorous selection process that assesses academic performance and, in particular, the student's aptitude and potential for a management career. For this purpose, selection interviews with an admissions committee are part of the admission process.

The CDI has three locations in Europe (Paris, Munich, Turin) and each year selects around 150 young graduates (engineers, natural scientists) from more than 1,000 applications who have first successfully completed a master's degree or doctorate at a university.

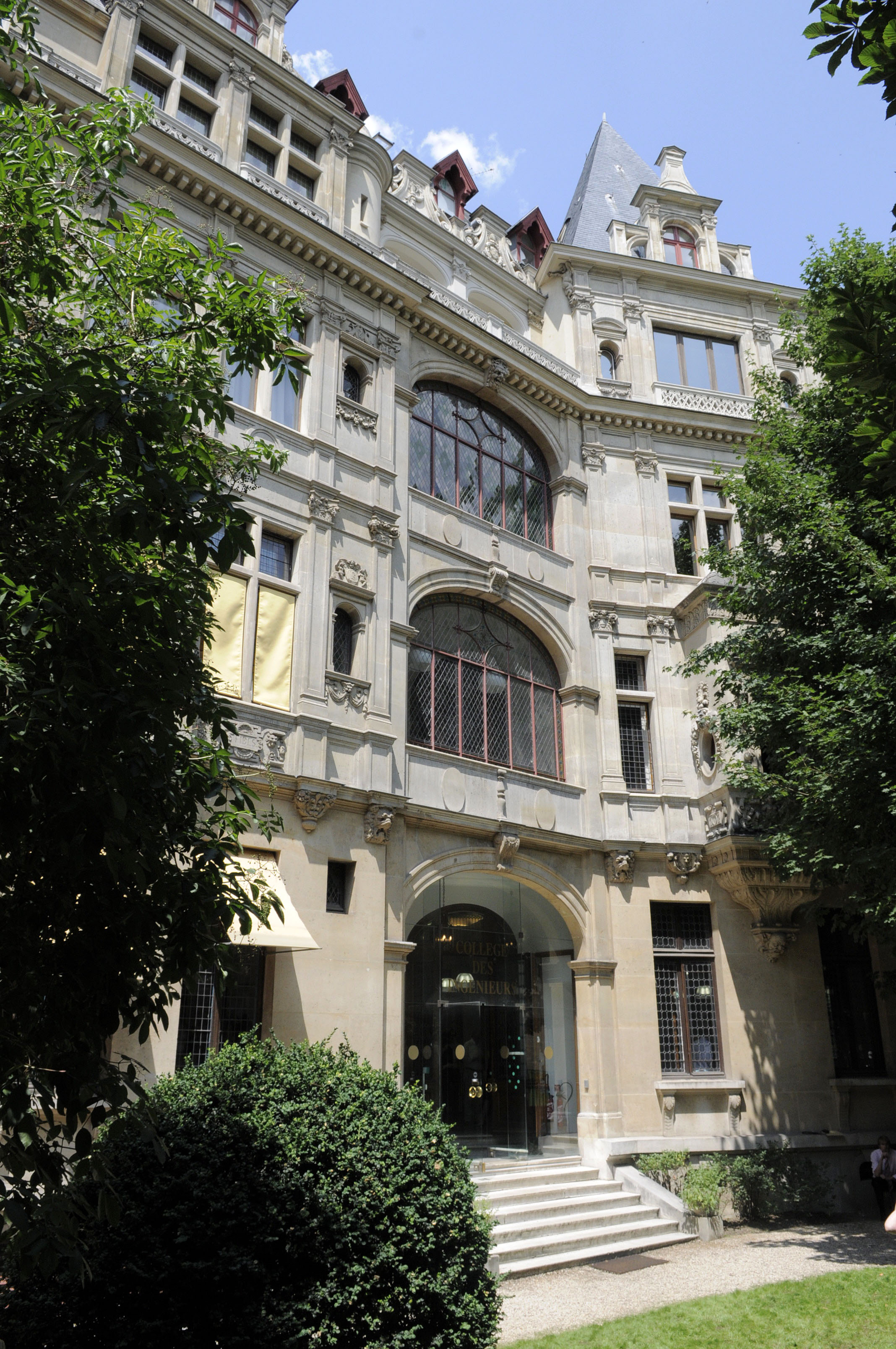
Collège des ingénieurs, Paris site

The Collège des Ingénieurs was founded in Paris in 1986 from a group of three leading Grandes Ecoles (Ecole des Ponts et Chausées, Ecole Normale (rue d'Ulm) and the ENGREF) on the initiative of companies. In Germany, the CDI is a recognised partner of the large German companies. The CDI in Italy was founded in partnership with the Agnelli Foundation, the Garrone Foundation and the Pirelli Foundation.

The educational concept is summarised by its Latin motto: "Qui agit intellegit".

Historically closely linked to the world of industry, its graduates (called "Fellows") come from the major European universities and Grandes Ecoles. In France, the CDI mainly accepts graduates from the leading Grandes Ecoles (École polytechnique, CentraleSupélec, Mines Paris, Ponts ParisTech, AgroParisTech, Télécom ParisTech, Espci, Ensta Paris) as well as from the Sorbonne Université, the research university Paris-Sciences-et-Lettres, the Université Paris-Saclay and the Écoles Normales Supérieures. In Germany, its students come from the major state universities of excellence (TU9, RWTH Aachen, Technical University of Munich, Karlsruhe Institute of Technology...). Likewise, in Italy they come from the state universities (Politecnico di Torino, Politecnico di Milano, Scuola Normale Superiore Pisa ...), as well as other European universities of excellence.

== Academics ==
=== Master of Business Administration of the Collège des Ingénieurs ===
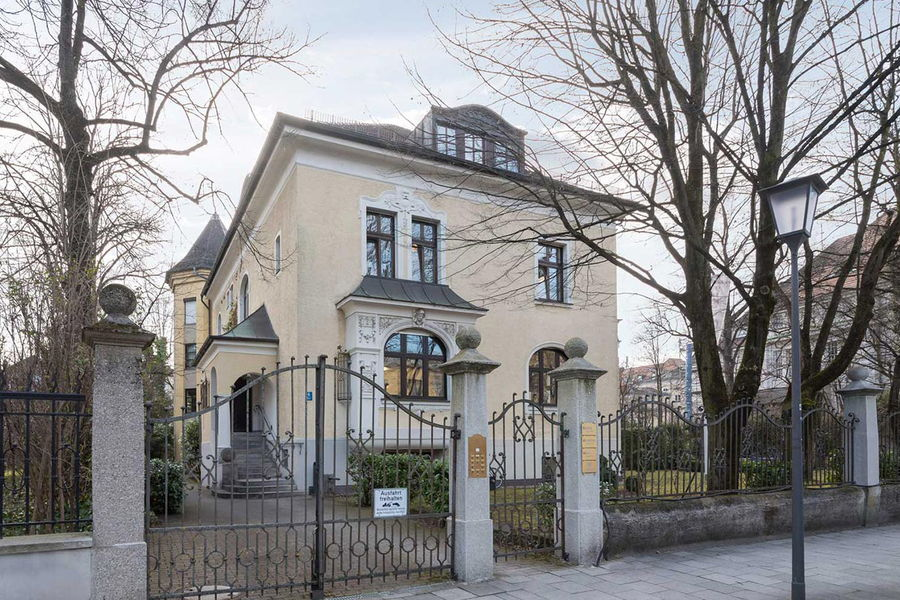
College des Ingenieurs, Munich site

Every year, the Collège des Ingénieurs graduates around 120-150 young engineers and scientists (STEM subjects) with a master's degree or higher (doctorate). The ten-month intensive full-time training concludes with an MBA diploma. A project assignment as a junior consultant in a company forms the second pillar of the programme. The programme is alternating, training units with intensive seminars and courses alternate with practical phases in the company.

The graduates at the CDI are employees of the school and work as junior consultants in the partner companies. They support the management there directly in strategy projects or are involved in innovation projects.

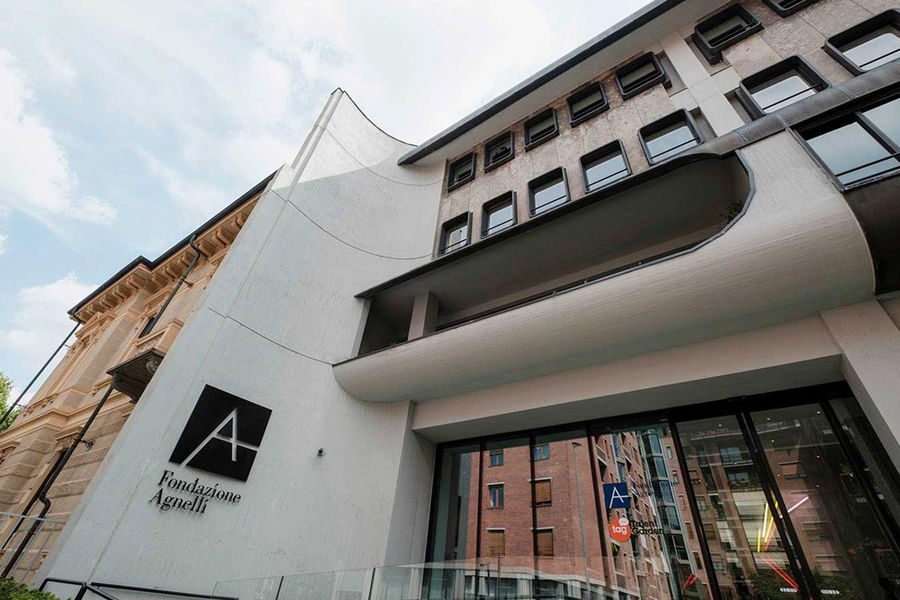
College des Ingenieurs, Turin site

The training is financed by the Collège des Ingenieurs and the graduates receive a salary at the college. The list of companies consists mainly of large industrial groups from France, Germany and Italy.

The training consists of thematic seminars assigned to five pillars: Finance, Operations, Innovation, Strategy and Marketing. In addition, Leadership & Personal Development occupy a crucial place in the training. Graduates are trained in particular with the aim of becoming leaders in companies or even company founders. The seminars and courses are held on a rotating basis at the European training bases.

Master classes by company leaders (CEO or chairman), entrepreneurs or personalities from society are also part of the training.

=== Science and Management Doctoral Programme ===
In 2009, the Collège des ingénieurs and the Université Pierre-et-Marie-Curie (now Sorbonne Université) founded the doctoral programme "Science et Management", which leads to the doctoral degrees in natural sciences of the UPMC and the MBA of the CDI.

This doctoral programme was extended to the Karlsruhe Institute of Technology (KIT) in the same year. However, in addition to doctoral students from the two universities in Paris and Karlsruhe, access is also open to doctoral students from other universities in Europe. Doctoral students from the research universities in Munich (Technical University of Munich and LMU Munich), Heidelberg, ETH Zurich, but also Paris Sciences et Lettres, the University of Paris-Saclay, the Institut Polytechnique de Paris as well as Sant'Anna Pisa are among the graduates of the Science & Management Programme. The programme combines a scientific doctorate at one of the university chairs. In parallel and after graduation, the theoretical and practical training modules take place at the Collège des Ingénieurs.

=== Copernic Programme ===
The Copernic Programme is a programme organised in France jointly with the Institut d'études politiques de Paris (Sciences Po) and the École nationale supérieure des mines de Paris, which trains graduates from the best universities in Central and Eastern Europe and prepares them for a management career. An intensive six-month training is followed by a full-time assignment in a company. The Copernic programme was financially supported by the French Ministry of Foreign Affairs through scholarships for all graduates.

It was launched in 1990. The programme trained over 1000 young graduates, mainly from Central and Eastern Europe, who were prepared in France for management careers in their home countries. The focus was on modern management and economic theory (market economy) and institutional framework conditions (parliamentary democracy), combined with a practical assignment in an international company.

=== Admission ===
Admission for the MBA programme takes place through an application process.

Admission is merit based and all programmes are tuition free.

On the basis of the academic profile, academic achievements and the personality and motivation of the applicants, the selection committee makes a recommendation for admission. Selection interviews with applicants are conducted with a selection panel in all 3 countries where the CDI is present. The selection juries are composed of representatives from companies.

From France, most graduates come from the French Grandes Ecoles (the ParisTech, Paris-Saclay networks) and the major universities: CentraleSupélec, École des mines, École des ponts, École polytechnique, École normale supérieure, AgroParisTech, Télécom ParisTech, ESPCI, Sorbonne Université.

In Germany, the graduates come mainly from the major state universities: RWTH Aachen University, Technical University of Munich, Karlsruhe Institute of Technology, Technische Universität Darmstadt, TU Dresden, University of Stuttgart. The CDI works together with some of the organisations that support gifted students (Studienstiftung des deutschen Volkes and Stiftung der deutschen Wirtschaft (SDW), among others) to enable graduates to gain access to the CDI.

From Italy, graduates come from the major technical universities: Politecnico di Milano, Politecnico di Turin, University of Padua, University of Bologna, Scuola Superiore Santa Anna in Pisa.

Other graduates come from European universities from Switzerland (ETH Zurich and EPF Lausanne), Universidad Politecnica de Madrid and Barcelona in Spain, Cambridge (UK), Delft, etc.

=== International ===
The Collège des Ingénieurs is a deliberately international institution. In addition to the historical intra-European cooperation (France, Germany, Italy), in which graduates work together in the joint seminar and training blocks, the institution promotes multicultural encounters. Graduates usually come from the three countries where the Collège is located, but a cohort often includes a number of graduates from all over Europe (Luxembourg, Austria, Switzerland, Spain, the UK...) as well as from North America and Asia.

80% of graduates have at least one year of experience abroad (study or research, employment), and 85% are at least trilingual and are among the top graduates of their respective universities.

The Collège des Ingénieurs has training sites in Munich, Paris and Turin.

It is common for graduates to live and work together during seminar blocks. This promotes close exchange between graduates, in an intensive working and learning environment.

== Notable graduates (Alumni) ==
Since 1986, the Collège des Ingénieurs, in association with the main players in European industry, has graduated more than 3000 MBAs (as of 2025) and 1000 fellows of the Copernic programme, who are now working in around 100 countries. The programme has helped train numerous business leaders and executives of global industrial groups, founders of technology companies, managers of innovation and heads of strategy consulting firms. Its graduates are active in Europe, China and North America. Some graduates have also held top-tier leadership positions in society.

=== Personalities from the world of business ===
CDI graduate	Name	Main activity
2021	Dr. Amelie Schönenwald	European Space Agency, ESA Reserve Astronaute, Senior manager Strategy at GSK
2015	Tobias von Mäßenhausen	CEO of ROLAND Rechtsschutz
2011	Jean-Charles Samuelian-Werve	Co-founder of Expliseat and Alan, Co-founding advisor & Board Member at Mistral AI
2003	Lars Wagner	CEO Commercial Aircraft at Airbus, former CEO MTU Aero Engines
2002	Anne-Christine Champion	Member of the senior management committee Natixis
2002	Guido Crespi	Senior partner and managing director, Boston Consulting Group, Italy (2006–2019)
2001	Li Jiaqing	Managing Director of Legend Capital
1998	Martha Crawford Heitzmann	Global R&D Director of Air liquide, Areva, L'Oréal
1997	Joachim Goldbeck	Founder and Geschäftsführer (CEO) of Goldbeck Solar, President Bundesverband Solarwirtschaft e.V.
1997	Karim Bousta	CEO of Getaround, VP Tesla, VP Lyft
1996	Isabel Marey-Semper	Member of the Board (Non-executive director) of Nokia, Rexel, L'Oréal
1996	Serge Magdeleine	Chief Executive Officer (CEO), Le Crédit Lyonnais
1996	John de Souza	Co-founder of Flash Communications (first instant messaging system acquired by Microsoft), CEO and c-founder of Ample (e-mobility)
1994	Erik Lamarre	Global Leader & Senior Partner of McKinsey
1993	Stéphane Dietrich	Co-founder of Neolane
1993	François Jackow	Chief Executive Officer (CEO) of Air Liquide
1993	Mohamed Kallala	CEO of Natixis and Member of the Executive Management Committee of Groupe BPCE
1992	Sonia Artinian-Fredou	Member of the senior management committee Michelin
1992	Pierre Luzeau	Président-directeur-général (CEO) of Seqens
1991	Frédéric de Courtois	Deputy CEO of AXA
1989	Pascal Minault	Directeur général (CEO) of Bouygues Construction
1989	Jacques Veyrat	Co-founder of Neuf Cegetel, président groupe Louis-Dreyfus, President of Impala
1988	François Venet	Member of the senior management committee of Air Liquide

=== Political personalities ===
CDI graduate	Name	Main activity
1987	Élisabeth Borne	Former French Prime-Minister and Minister of State: Higher Education and Research (2024– ), Première ministre (2022–2024), ministre des Transports (2017–2019), de l'Écologie (2019–2020), du Travail (2020–2022)
2004	Julien Denormandie	French Minister: Ministre chargé de la Ville et du Logement (2018–2020), Ministre de l'Agriculture et de l'Alimentation (2020–2022), coordinateur du parti En Marche !
1997	Nathalie Kosciusko-Morizet	French Minister: ministre de l'Écologie (2010–2012)
1994	Kristóf Szalay-Bobrovniczky	Hungarian diplomat and politician: ambassador of Hungary to the United Kingdom 2016 - 2022. Minister of Defence since 2022
1992	Philippe Léglise-Costa	French ambassador to the European Union (2017-)
1998	Valérie Rabault	French Member of Parliament, députée du Tarn-et-Garonne (2012–2024), First Vice-president of the National Assembly (France) (2022–2024)
2004	Mohamed Methqal	Ambassador, Director of the Agence marocaine de coopération internationale

== Alumni Association ==
The Alumni Association of the Collège des Ingénieurs in Germany (CDI Alumni Deutschland e.V.) cultivates relations with alumni and organises events such as the annual Alumni Convention, local working groups in workshops, lectures etc., discussion groups and meetings with personalities from science and industry.

The Alumni e.V. was founded on the initiative of 7 alumni in Baden Baden in 2007. The founding president is Dr. Marc Fischer (CDI 2003).

The German Leadership Award has been presented as part of the Alumni Convention since 2014.

== History ==
The Collège des Ingénieurs was initiated in 1986 by a founding group led by Jean Peyrelevade, then president of Compagnie Financière de Suez, and established under the direction of Philippe Mahrer at the Ecole Nationale des Ponts et Chausées (now PontsParisTech) in Paris.

According to its founders, there are ideas, principles and methods that cannot be understood through study alone, but only through action in a business context. Thus, the institution's motto is "Qui agit intellegit": "He who acts understands". Since its foundation, the Collège des Ingénieurs has not only trained graduates of the Grandes Ecoles and universities for a management career in companies, it also prepares a selection of future French civil servants (Fonctionnaires d'Etat) for a management career in the French civil service. This is done through cooperation with the Corps des Ponts et Chausées of the Ministry of Transport and Infrastructure and Ecology.

After the fall of the Berlin Wall in 1989, the Collège des Ingénieurs launched a programme for future talent for the integration of Western and Eastern Europe, the Copernic programme. It was aimed at graduates from Central-Eastern Europe and was run in cooperation with large French groups. This programme was launched with the approval of French President François Mitterrand in cooperation with the French Ministry of Foreign Affairs, and three educational institutions in France, the Institut d'études politiques de Paris (Sciences Po), the École des Mines de Paris and the École des Ponts et Chaussées. By 2010, the end of the Copernic programme, the Collège des Ingénieurs had trained more than 1000 graduates from Central-Eastern Europe for management careers in industry.

In 1990, the college moves to 49, rue de l'Université, in Paris.

1992: The Collège des Ingénieurs is recognised in France for the award of the Actuarial Diploma (diplome d'actuaire).

1994: The signing of the agreement for a CDI-China Programme with the Ministry of Science and Technology of the People's Republic of China allows graduates of top Chinese universities to graduate from the Collège. The CDI diploma is officially recognised in China. The cooperation was concluded in Dresden in 2019 for another 25 years.

In 1996, the European expansion of the Collège des Ingénieurs began. Knut Stannowski, himself a graduate of the Collège des Ingénieurs, establishes a first programme base outside France in Stuttgart, Germany with the support of the cabinet of the Minister President of Baden-Württemberg. Relations with Germany are rapidly expanded.

In 2003, a third local office is opened in St. Gallen, Switzerland, and in 2006, a local office is also opened in Munich, Germany.

In 2006, through Philippe Mahrer, the Collège des Ingénieurs in France was an active member of the Commission Hetzel, which is preparing the law on the responsibilities of universities in France (Loi relative aux libertés et responsabilités des universités, LRU law) to reform the French higher education system.

In 2009, the doctoral programme Sciences & Management was created in cooperation with the Université Pierre-et-Maire-Curie (UPMC) in Paris (now Sorbonne Université). It enables doctoral students to complete the MBA of the Collège des Ingénieurs parallel to their scientific dissertation at a university. It is being extended to German doctoral graduates through a cooperation with the Karlsruhe Institute of Technology (KIT).

In September 2009, on the initiative of Philippe Mahrer, John Elkann, vice-president of the Agnelli Foundation, Marco Tronchetti Provera, President of the Pirelli Foundation, and Riccardo Garrone, President of the Garrone Foundation, the Italian counterpart of the CDI was founded in Turin: the Scuola di Alta Formazione al Management (now CDI Italia), whose MBA is linked to that of the Collège des Ingénieurs and developed according to the same educational principles.

In 2009, the Collège moved its training base in Paris to 215 Boulevard Saint-Germain.

In 2015, the Brain and Spine Institute (ICM: l'Institut du Cerveau et de la Moelle épinière) in Paris and the Collège des Ingénieurs initiated a summer university dedicated to the ideation of entrepreneurial solutions in the field of neuroscience.

In 2016, the college created CDI-Labs to support industry partners in their innovation strategy, and in particular to identify European and Israeli start-ups and facilitate the implementation of pilot collaboration projects between start-ups and companies.

Also in 2016, Silvia Petocchi, Director of CDI Italia, and Fabiola Gianotti Director General of CERN, agreed on a partnership including the development of the Innovation-for-Change (i4c) programme. The aim of the cycle, carried out with the Politecnico di Torino, is the ideation of startups (high societal impact startups) as part of the training programmes of the Collège des Ingénieurs.

In 2017, CDI Italia will be fully integrated into the CDI network, returning to Via Giacosa 38 in Turin, Italy. The move to the historic villa of Senator Giovanni Agnelli underlines the link between the Collège des Ingénieurs and the innovative spirit of the Agnelli family.

2018 Move to the CDI's new site in Munich, Germany at Möhlstraße 6.

2018 Launch of the School of Entrepreneurship and Innovation (SEI) together with the Fondazione Agnelli. Entrepreneurship training programmes will be offered in Turin. SEI will transfer to Vento of EXOR in 2021.

In 2019, the Science&Management doctoral programme will also be extended to Italy, in cooperation with Scuola Normale die Pisa.

In 2025, the Collège des Ingénieurs becomes partner and shareholder of SouthwestX, one of the 10 Startup Factories launched as beacons of the German startup ecosystem. The excellence-oriented Startup Factories are created as public-private partnerships between scientific institutions and cooperation and financing partners from industry, funded by the German Ministry of Economy.
