= Frederique Olivier =

French scientist and cinematographer

- Known for: Antarctic snow petrels studies, BBC Earth cinematography
- Scientific career
- Fields: Animal Behavior, Glaciology, Landscape ecology
- Workplaces: University of Tasmania
- Website: https://fredpics.smugmug.com/

Frederique Olivier is a French scientist and cinematographer. She studied snow petrels in Antarctica and is best known for her work with the BBC for her film work on penguins.

== Education and research career ==
Olivier started her career at ArgoParisTech where she got a Masters of Science in Engineering for environmental engineering on October 18, 1998. She then continued her education at James Cook University where she focused her studies on marine biochemistry, graduating on May 18, 2000. After she got her Masters of Science degree there she continued her education at the University of Tasmania where she got her PhD in Antarctic Ecology, awarded December 19, 2005. Since graduating she has continued to work with the University of Tasmania while also working on her cinematography as a freelancer.

From 2002 to 2006 Frederique's work was on the snow petrels of Antarctica, where she was able to model their nesting habitats. was Her papers were about GIS (geometric information system) on East Antarctica and the snow petrel populations there. Her focus mainly being on nesting and breeding habits of the snow petrels in the East Antarctic and on sea ice. This data collection is important for monitoring populations of the petrels as well as how the birds react to changes within Antarctica.

== Film career ==
In 2005 Frederique was a film assistant to Wade Fairley for a BBC's Planet Earth TV series. The team wanted to capture imagery of the Emperor Penguins huddling behavior. They wanted to be able to capture how the penguins behavior was essential for survival, without being caught in a blizzard. In the year spent filming on the continent the team was able to monitor the penguin colony and collect lots of data on their behaviors. During filming Frederique found a baby penguin stuck under the ice and chipped away at the ice to free it, while wildlife production crews try to avoid interference she deemed her aide to be reasonable due to their proximity and time spent together.

In 2013 Frederique was a part of the film team for the BBC Earth's Penguins: spy in the huddle, also named Penguins: waddle all the way. The crew spent over 330 days in the Antarctic, leaving February 12, 2012 and returning on February 1, 2013. She found the biggest challenges to filming in such a remote place was the long periods exposed to the weather. The use of specialized spy cams disguised as either chicks or eggs made the Emperor Penguins behave as normal rather than stressed by human interference. The small chick replica cameras allowed for some closeup shots that would have been impossible by human hands alone.

== Selected works ==
Frederique Olivier, Michael Ridd, David Klumpp "The use of transplanted cultured tropical oysters (Saccostrea commercialis) to monitor Cd levels in North Queensland coastal waters (Australia)". Marine Pollution Bulletin 44,1051–1062 (2002).

Olivier, F., Lee, A.V. & Woehler, E.J. "Distribution and abundance of snow petrels Pagodroma nivea in the Windmill Islands, East Antarctica". Polar Biol 27, 257–265 (2004).

Olivier, Frederique. “Variations of Snow Petrel Breeding Success in Relation to Sea-Ice Extent: Detecting Local Response to Large-Scale Processes?” Polar Biology, Springer Nature, 2005.
