= Jardin botanique de l'Institut National =

Botanical garden in Île-de-France, France

Coordinates: 48.8471°N 1.9428°E

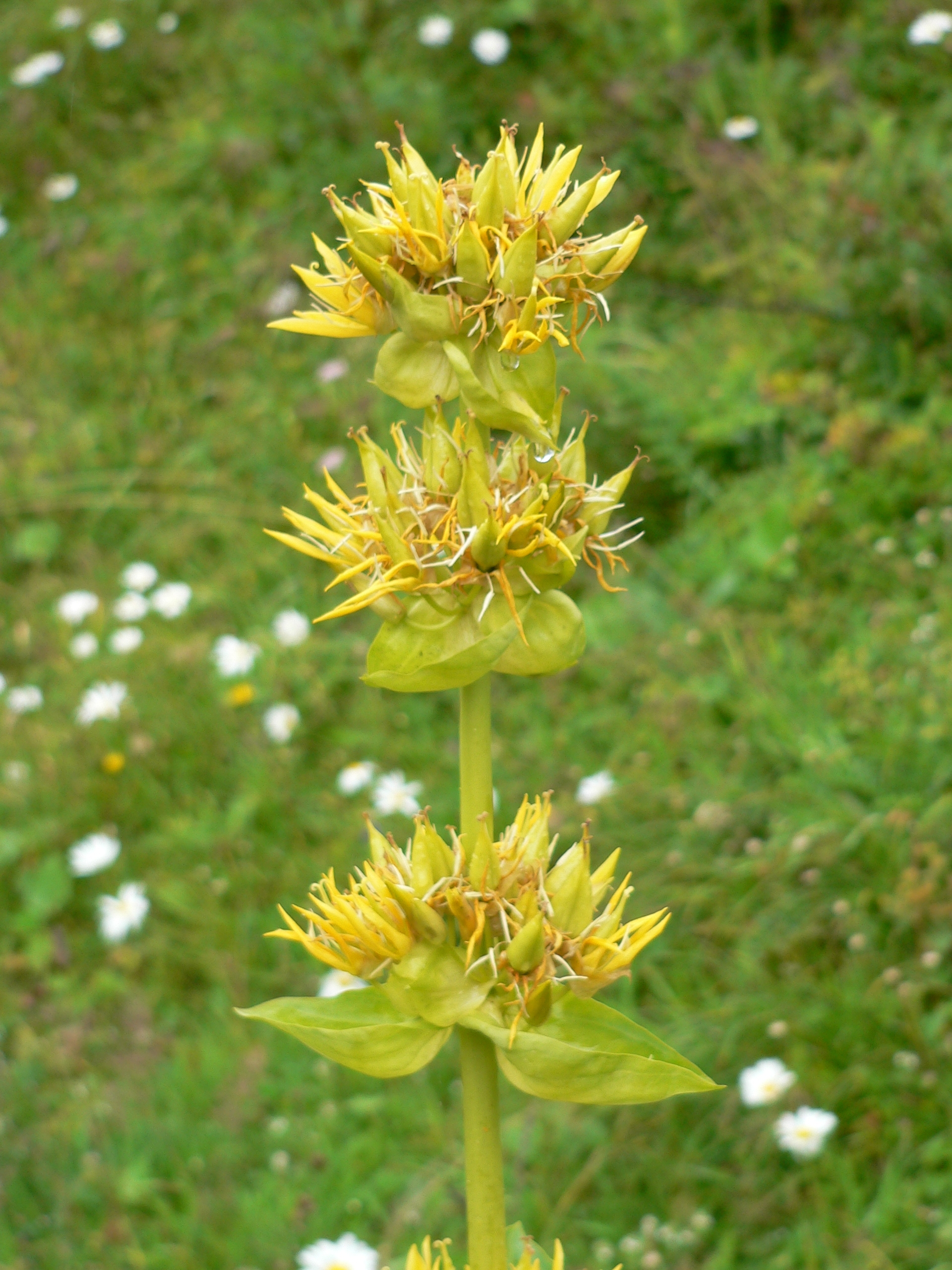

The Jardin botanique de l'Institut National (French pronunciation: [ʒaʁdɛ̃ bɔtanik də lɛ̃stity nɑsjɔnal]; Botanical Garden of the National Institute") is a small botanical garden located within the campus of the Institut des sciences et industries du vivant et de l'environnement (AgroParisTech), formerly known as the Institut National Agronomique Paris-Grignon, on the Avenue Lucien Brétignières, Thiverval-Grignon, Yvelines, Île-de-France, France. It is closed to the public but may be visited by groups.

The garden was established sometime before 1979 on a plot of land adjacent to the Arboretum de Grignon. Today it consists of 34 beds containing about 1,000 taxa with an emphasis on Graminae, Leguminosae, ornamental plants, and plants of limestone soils. The Association de l'arbre de fer was established in 2001 to protect and enhance the campus' natural environment, and in 2003 it began restoration and enlargement of the arboretum, as well as creation of a botanical trail and rehabilitation of the garden.

== See also ==
- Arboretum de Grignon
- List of botanical gardens in France
