= Robin Rivaton =

French entrepreneur, investor and author

- Born: 17 July 1987 (age 39); Firminy, Loire, France
- Education: Sciences Po (MA, 2011); ESCP Europe (2012)
- Occupations: Entrepreneur; investor; essayist
- Organization(s): Stonal, BCG
- Known for: Proptech, housing policy, impact of AI on urban development
- Title: CEO of Stonal
- Website: robinr.substack.com

Robin Rivaton (born July 17, 1987) is a French entrepreneur, investor, and essayist. He is known for his work on real estate, housing policy, AI, and the impact of new technologies on urban development.

== Biography ==
=== Early life ===
Rivaton grew up in Firminy, a former steelmaking town in the suburbs of Saint-Étienne, and has described his background as working-class. He completed his secondary education at the Albert Camus public high school in Firminy. He then pursued higher education at Sciences Po, where he earned a master's degree in economic law in 2011, followed by a degree in management from ESCP Europe in 2012.

=== Career ===
In 2012, Rivaton joined the Boston Consulting Group (BCG) as an associate. In April 2016, he joined the office of Valérie Pécresse at the Île-de-France Regional Council as an advisor in charge of economic attractiveness and development. In September 2016, he was appointed to the executive management of Paris Region Enterprises (PRE), the agency responsible for promoting the Île-de-France region, later renamed Choose Paris Region. He left the organization in 2018, following initiatives aimed at attracting companies relocating from London after Brexit.

After working as a venture capitalist, he became a partner and president of Stonal in 2022. Stonal raised €20 million in 2022 and €100 million in 2024 to expand its AI-powered real estate SaaS platform. He is also a co-founder of Vibiscus, a deep tech company specializing in acoustics.

=== Real estate and urban policy ===
In March 2019, Julien Denormandie, then Minister for Housing and Urban Affairs, tasked Rivaton with examining the digital transformation of the construction and real estate sectors. He was later appointed to the board of directors of Sogeprom, a subsidiary of Société Générale, and joined the supervisory board of CDC Habitat in 2022. Rivaton has published eight essays on economy and real estate. He appears regularly as a commentator on BFM Business and has contributed to major newspapers including Le Monde and Le Figaro.

== Selected publications ==
- Relancer notre industrie par les robots, Paris: Du Quesne, 2013.
- La France est prête, Paris: Les Belles Lettres, 2014. ISBN 978-2-7440-7450-9.
- Aux actes dirigeants, Paris: Fayard, 2016.
- Quand l’État tue la nation, Paris: Plon, 2016.
- L’Immobilier demain, Paris: Dunod, 2017.
- La Ville pour tous, Paris: L’Observatoire, 2019.
- Souriez, vous êtes filmés, Paris: L’Observatoire, 2021. ISBN 979-1032914502.
- Why China will run the 21st century, self-published, 2026.
