= Michel Griffon =

French agronomist (1948–2026)

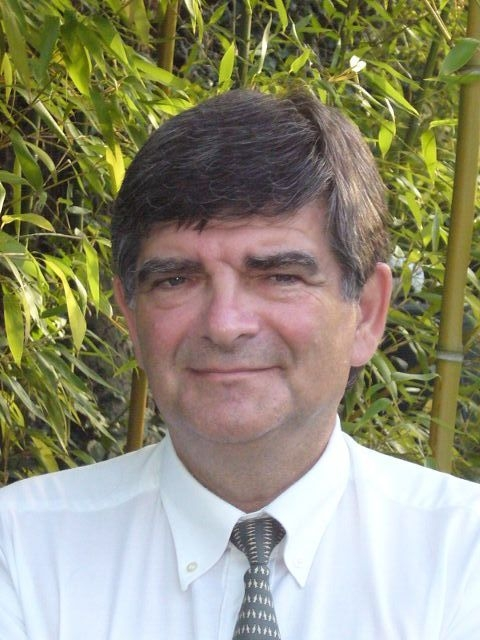
- Griffon in 2014
- Born: 31 October 1948; Bourges, France
- Died: 4 January 2026 (aged 77)
- Education: Institut national agronomique Paris Grignon (Dipl.Ing.)
- Occupation: Agronomist

Michel Griffon (French: [miʃɛl gʁifɔ̃]; 31 October 1948 – 4 January 2026) was a French agronomist.

== Life and career ==
Born in Bourges on 31 October 1948, Griffon earned his Diplôme d'Ingénieur from the Institut national agronomique Paris Grignon in 1971. He then worked as a public policy analyst for the Société d'études pour le développement économique et social, an organization created by the Caisse des dépôts et consignations. He was then a program secretary for the Ministry of Cooperation from 1982 to 1986. While working as a research scientist for the Centre de coopération internationale en recherche agronomique pour le développement, he invented the term "ecologically intensive agriculture" to describe farming practices in the Global South. In 2015, he joined the scientific council of the Centre d'information des viandes.

Griffon died on 4 January 2026, at the age of 77.

== Decorations ==
- Knight of the Legion of Honour
- Knight of the Ordre national du Mérite
- Titular member of the Académie d'Agriculture (2003)
- Commander of the Ordre du Mérite agricole (2017)

== Publications ==
- Les politiques agricoles et alimentaires en Afrique (1991)
- Vers une révolution doublement verte (1995)
- Institutional Changes for Sustainable Agricultural and Rural Development (1996)
- Le jardin d'agronomie tropicale (2006)
- Nourrir la planète (2006)
- La planète, ses crises et nous, économie et écologie d'un monde enviable (2008)
- L'Homme viable : du développement au développement durable (2011)
- Pour un monde viable : changement global et viabilité planétaire (2011)
- Pour des agricultures écologiquement intensives (2011)
- Qu’est-ce que l’agriculture écologiquement intensive ? (2013)
- Écologie intensive. La nature, un modèle pour l'agriculture et la société (2017)
