= CPI Group =

CPI Group may refer to:

- China Power Investment Corporation, a Chinese utility company
- CPI International, a US electronics company
- Czech Property Investments, a Czech real estate company
- CPI Property Group, real estate developer based in Luxembourg
- CPI SAS, Europes largest book manufacturer, a subsidiary of Impala SAS
