= Arboretum de Grignon =

Arboretum in Île-de-France, France

Coordinates: 48.8476°N 1.9433°E

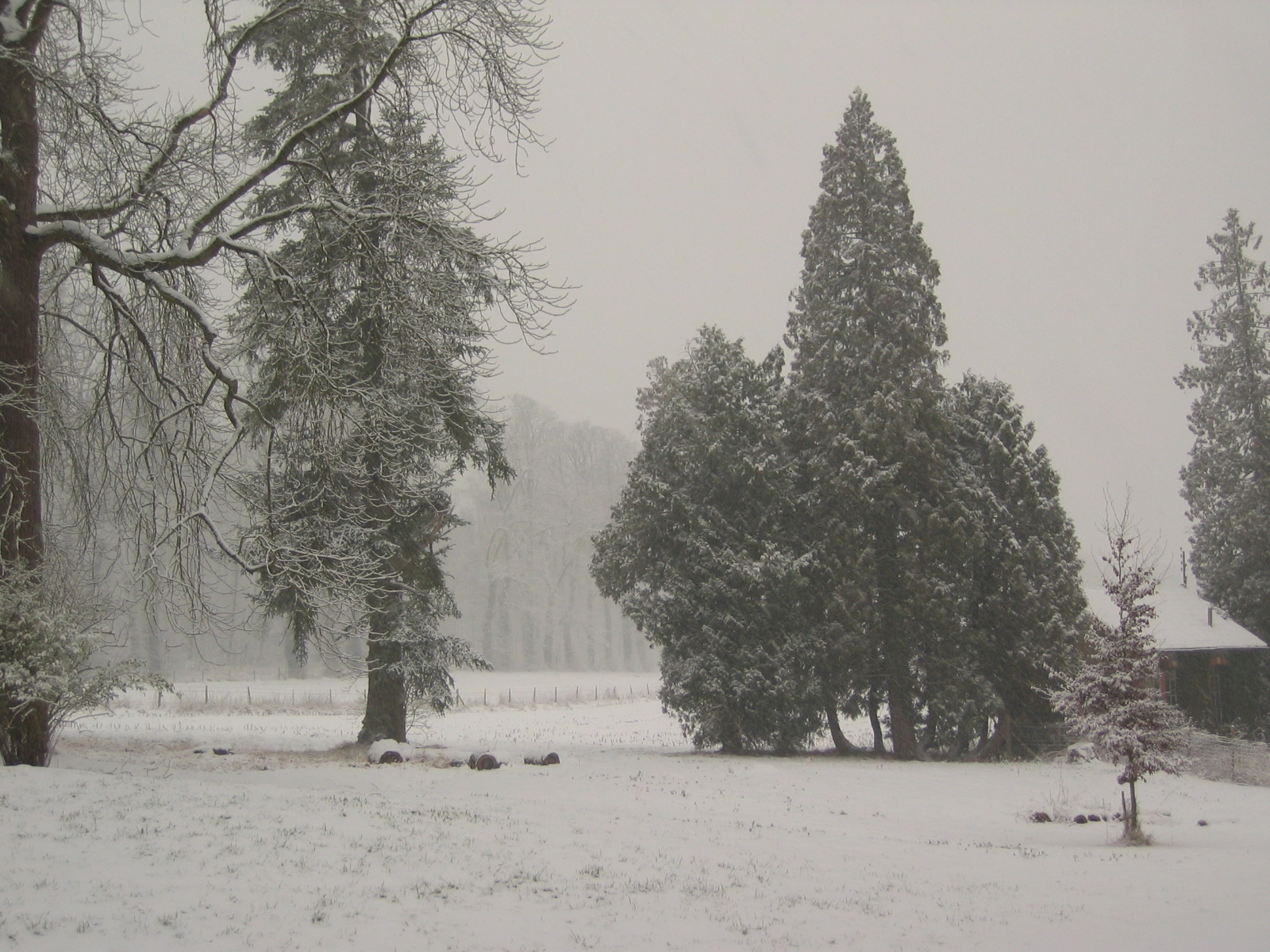
The arboretum under snow

The Arboretum de Grignon (French pronunciation: [aʁbɔʁetɔm də ɡʁiɲɔ̃]; 0.8 hectares) is an arboretum located within the campus of the Institut des sciences et industries du vivant et de l'environnement (AgroParisTech) on Avenue Lucien Brétignières, Thiverval-Grignon, Yvelines, Île-de-France, France. It is closed to the public but may be visited by groups.

The arboretum was established in 1873 by Pierre Mouillefert, professor at Grignon, who published in 1896 a pamphlet describing the arboretum at that date; however, it was lost in 1940. The arboretum grew gradually over time, with the most recent plantings between 1976-1978. Various of the trees were labeled in 1975 by Mr. George Callen of the Arboretum de Chèvreloup, and in 1991 Mr. Augustin Scalbert created a map identifying almost all trees. At that time, the arboretum contained approximately 230 specimens (66% deciduous, 34% conifers).

Unfortunately, the arboretum was heavily damaged in the storm of December 1999, which destroyed 23 trees and severely damaged 16. In response, the Association de l'arbre de fer was established in 2001 to protect and enhance the natural environment of the former Institut National Agronomique Paris-Grignon. In 2003 it began restoration and enlargement of the arboretum, as well as creation of a botanical trail and rehabilitation of the campus botanical garden.

Today the arboretum contains about 125 tree species and varieties, including notable, mature specimens of Cedrus atlantica, Fagus sylvatica var. "Tortuosa", Ginkgo biloba, Gleditsia triacanthos, Parrotia persica, Pinus nigra subsp. laricio, Sophora japonica "pendula", and Zelkova carpinifolia.

== See also ==
- Jardin botanique de l'Institut National
- List of botanical gardens in France
- Crataegus grignonensis
