= Julien Denormandie =

French politician (born 1980)

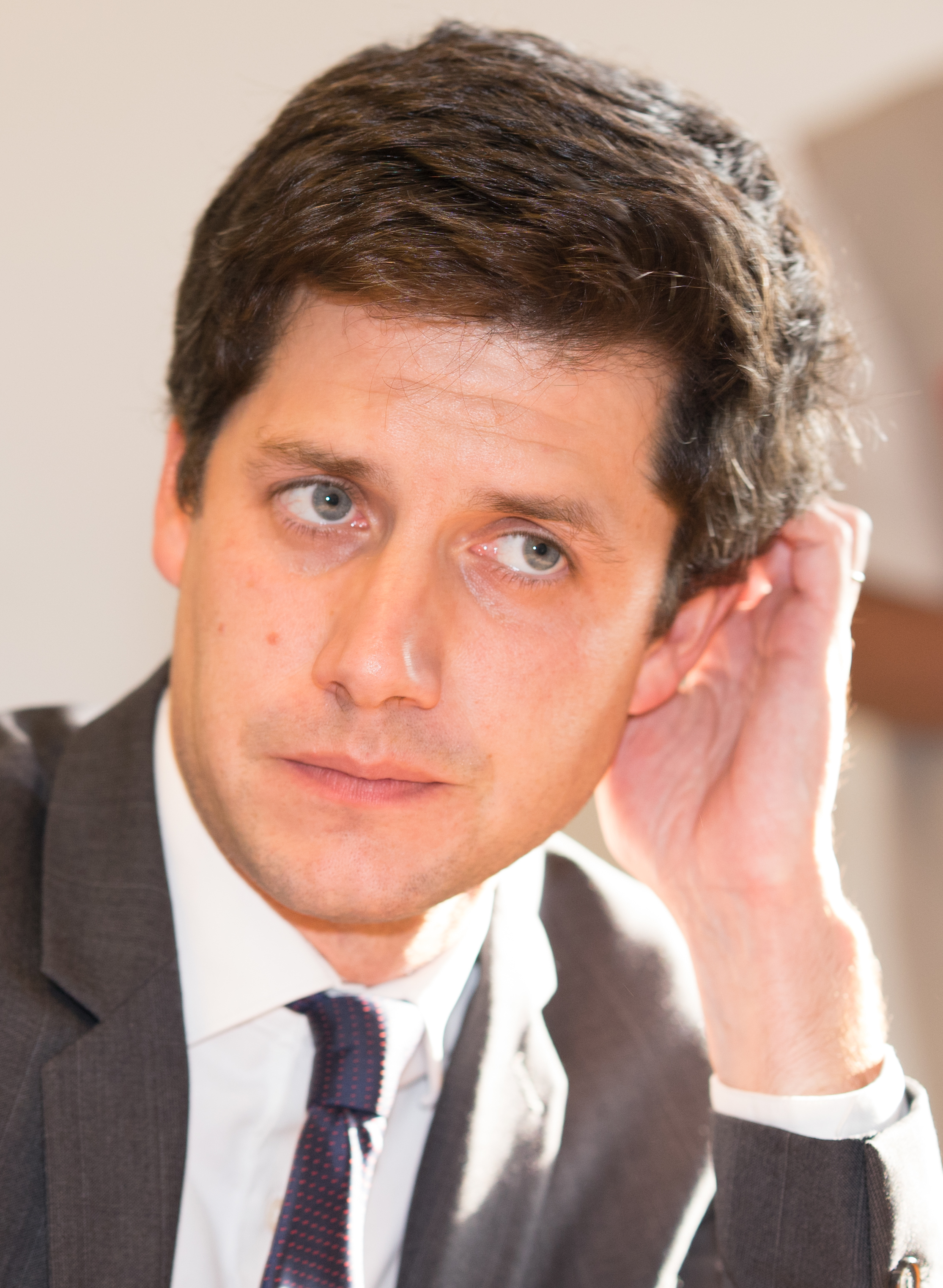
- Denormandie in 2018

Minister of Agriculture and Food
- In office 6 July 2020 – 20 May 2022
- President: Emmanuel Macron
- Prime Minister: Jean Castex
- Preceded by: Didier Guillaume
- Succeeded by: Marc Fesneau

Minister of the City and Housing
- In office 16 October 2018 – 6 July 2020
- President: Emmanuel Macron
- Prime Minister: Édouard Philippe; Jean Castex
- Preceded by: Hélène Geoffroy
- Succeeded by: Emmanuelle Wargon

Secretary of State to the Minister of Territorial Cohesion
- In office 21 June 2017 – 16 October 2018
- Prime Minister: Édouard Philippe
- Preceded by: Post created
- Succeeded by: Post deleted

Personal details
- Born: 14 August 1980 (age 46) Cahors, France
- Party: La République En Marche!
- Education: Agro ParisTech; Collège des Ingénieurs
- Profession: Engineer

Julien Denormandie (born 14 August 1980) is a French engineer and politician of La République En Marche! (LREM) who served as Minister of Agriculture in the government of Prime Minister Jean Castex from 2019 to 2022.

Denormandie was named Minister (in France named Secretary of state) of Territorial Cohesion on 21 June 2017, and then Minister for Towns and Housing in October 2018.

== Early life and education ==
After being admitted in 2000 to Agro ParisTech, Denormandie passed the entry exam into the Rural, Water and Forest Engineer's Corps in 2002. After studying as an apprentice in the 2002-2004 group, he took the ENGREF course in the first year and an MBA at the Collège des Ingénieurs in the second year.

== Early career ==
After being named a Countryside, Water and Forests engineer on 1 October 2004, Denormandie was assigned to a position at the Ministry of the Economy and Finances. In 2011, he was chief of the foreign offices of Turkey, the Balkans, the CEI and the Middle East concerning bilateral economic relationships and the Treasury Office.

He rejoined the ministerial cabinets, before becoming Counsel to the Minister of Foreign Commerce Nicole Bricq and Minister of Finances Pierre Moscovici in July 2012, a position where he was noticed by the Cabinet Director Rémy Rioux, then by Emmanuel Macron, the then-secretary general at the Élysée (French Presidential Office).

In the summer of 2014, Denormandie created a start-up with Ismael Emelien. The aim of the project 'was to see how technology (through educational applications) could benefit early years learning,' until Emmanuel Macron (who had been Economics Minister for a number of years) got them on his side. He became the joint cabinet director in September 2014.

== Political career ==
Denormandie left his government post in March 2016 to participate in the creation of La République En Marche! of which he became the joint secretary. In this capacity, he was part of Macron’s campaign staff.

Following the 2017 elections, Denormandie was a Minister of the City and Housing (2018-2020) and State Secretary to successive Ministers of Territorial Cohesion Jacques Mézard and Jacqueline Gourault (2017-2018) in the government of Prime Ministers Édouard Philippe. During that time, he notably announced in 2017 cuts to a housing allowance scheme enjoyed by 10 percent of the population and promised to free up social housing for the most needy as the government sought to rein in public spending.

In 2020, Denormandie oversaw work on a draft law reversing a ban on a class of pesticides and allowing sugar beet growers to use neonicotinoids, in a move portrayed as essential to save the country’s sugar industry.

== Career in the private sector ==
Since he left government in 2022, Denormandie has been serving as Chief Impact Officer at French startup Sweep, a carbon emission management service. He also joined Clara Gaymard’s investment fund Raise as advisor.

== Other activities ==
- Institut de la Finance Durable (IFD), Member of the Board of Directors (since 2022)
