= Veyrat =

Veyrat is a French surname. Notable people with the surname include:

- Jacques Veyrat (born 1962), French businessman
- Marc Veyrat (born 1950), French chef
- Xavier Veyrat (1807–1876), French playwright
