= Sonia Garel =

French immunologist and academic

- Born: March 1, 1972 (age 54); Paris
- Education: AgroParisTech; Paris-Sorbonne University
- Scientific career
- Workplaces: Ecole Normale Superieure; Collège de France; Inserm

Sonia Garel (born March 1, 1972) is a French neurobiologist, professor at the Collège de France and head of a research team at the Institut de biologie de l'Ecole normale supérieure in Paris.

== Early life and education ==
Garel was born in Paris. She studied engineering at the AgroParisTech as an undergraduate. She moved to the Paris-Sorbonne University for graduate research, where she specialised in molecular and cellular neurobiology. Her doctoral research considered developmental biology. She moved to the University of California, San Francisco as a postdoctoral researcher with John Rubenstein. In 2003, she returned to France as an Inserm Research Officer.

== Research and career ==
In 2008, Garel joined the Institut of Biology of the Ecole Normale Superieure. She was made professor at the Collège de France in 2020. She was elected to the Scientific Council of the City of Paris in 2021.

Sonia Garel's research focuses on understanding the mechanisms by which neuronal circuits are assembled during embryogenesis9,10 and after birth. She is particularly interested in the dynamics of neuronal migration and the roles of cells of the brain's immune system, known as microglia11. Her research has shown that these brain macrophages contribute to the proper wiring of brain circuits. It has also shown that microglia are involved in the deleterious effects of prenatal inflammation, a potential risk factor for neurodevelopmental diseases. This work also highlights the fact that microglia respond to environmental modifications, such as changes in intestinal microbiota, as early as the prenatal stages.

== Awards and honours ==
- 2008 Young European Researchers Award
- 2012 EMBO Young Researchers Award
- 2012 European Research Council Consolidator Grant
- 2014 Antoine Lacassagne Prize of the Collège de France
- 2016 Chevalière de l’ordre national du Mérite
- 2018 EMBO Member
- 2019 Fondation Schlumberger pour l’Education et la Recherche (FSER) laureate
- 2020 Grad Prize of the NRJ – Institut de France Foundation
- 2022 Member of the French Science Academy
