= Martha Crawford =

American researcher (born 1967)

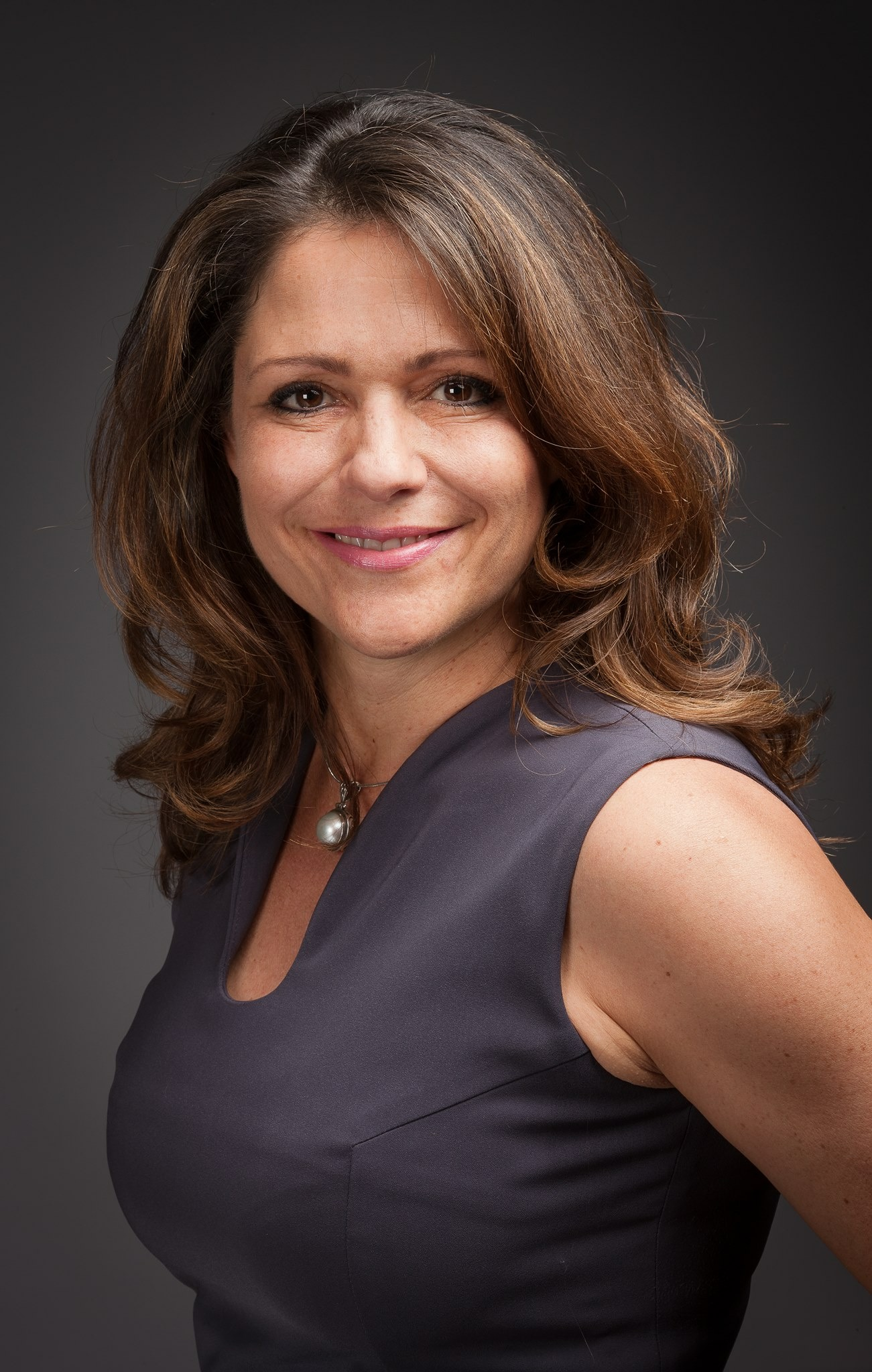
- Crawford in 2024
- Born: September 30, 1967 (age 58); Tucson, Arizona, US
- Education: Harvard University; University of Arizona; Collège des Ingénieurs, France
- Occupations: Environmental engineer, business executive

Martha Crawford (born September 30, 1967) is an American technologist and international business leader. She was the head of research and innovation on the managing board of Areva, the French state-owned nuclear power conglomerate (renamed Orano in 2021). She also served as vice president for group research and development at Air Liquide, one of the top 40 private-sector companies in France. Crawford has served on the boards of several French publicly listed companies (Ipsen Pharma, Altran Technologies, Suez SA), and on the boards of the French national energy research labs (CEA, CNRS). One of a very few Americans in the upper ranks of French business, she has an academic background in environmental and chemical engineering, finance and business. After being based in Paris for 20 years, Crawford returned to the United States in 2016. She taught at Harvard Business School, and served as Dean of the Jack Welch College of Business, before rejoining the private sector as board member and advisor to large private equity groups, since 2021. Crawford is a frequent invited speaker on environmental infrastructure investments and the energy transition, and was honored in Kuwait in 2024 with a lifetime achievement award at the International Hydrogen Energy Symposium.

== Early life ==
Born in Tucson, Arizona, she grew up on a ranch north of Tucson and attended University High School, a public school for the academically gifted and talented. She studied ecology and evolutionary biology at the University of Arizona in Tucson on an Arizona Board of Regents academic scholarship and a fellowship from the E. Blois du Bois Foundation of Phoenix, Arizona.

After graduating in 1989, she worked as an environmental policy intern in the office of Senator Al Gore in Washington, D.C., then as adviser to the head of the Environmental Protection Authority in the republic of the Marshall Islands in Micronesia. She returned to the United States in 1992 to pursue her master's degree and PhD in environmental engineering at Harvard University (with master's coursework and PhD supervision in chemical engineering based at the Massachusetts Institute of Technology). She was awarded the PhD in 1997 and moved to Paris, where she received her Master of Business Administration degree from the Collège des Ingénieurs.

== Career ==
=== Early career ===
After working at Suez S.A. in Paris, in 1999 Crawford joined the Organisation for Economic Co-operation and Development. She was an analyst and later principal administrator in the OECD Environment Directorate's program of environmental performance reviews of member and non-member countries, leading multinational teams of experts in evaluating how countries measured up to their own environmental commitments as defined in domestic legislation and international agreements.

=== Air Liquide ===
In 2007, Crawford was named vice president of research and development for Air Liquide, where she was responsible for setting strategic direction and leading Air Liquide's R&D activities worldwide. Overseeing the Air Liquide group's eight main R&D centers in Europe, North America and Asia, she administered an innovation budget of over €230 million a year in areas including energy efficiency and industrial process optimization; renewable energy forms such as solar photovoltaics technology, biofuel and hydrogen fuel; and carbon capture and storage.

=== Areva ===
At Areva, as a member of the Executive Operations Committee since early 2011, Crawford manages the group's R&D activities (including a €350 million annual budget and ten technical centers in France, Germany and the United States), its intellectual property portfolio, and technological communications and expertise. Areva's R&D areas range from uranium mining and chemical conversion to advanced nuclear reactors and the recycling of spent nuclear fuel. Under Crawford, the R&D portfolio has increased its emphasis on development of alternative energy technologies, including offshore wind power (5 MW turbines), concentrated solar power (Fresnel reflectors) and low-temperature electrolysis coupled with hydrogen fuel cells (Areva's "Green Energy Box").

=== Board memberships ===
Crawford serves on the boards of the following organizations:

Areva Med, a subsidiary of Areva producing radioisotopes that target specific types of cancer.

The Areva Foundation, a charitable foundation supporting efforts to fight illiteracy and AIDS.

The Centre National de la Recherche Scientifique (CNRS), France's premier public research agency.

The Commissariat à l'Énergie Atomique et aux Energies Alternatives (CEA).

The Agence nationale de la recherche, which awards funding to public and private scientific research projects.

=== Other activities ===
A frequent public speaker in France, Germany and the United States, Crawford contributes in several countries to work on strategy to improve public-private cooperation for R&D and to strengthen education in the sciences and engineering. She is active in international women's networks and, in a country where a 2010 survey of major companies showed that women made up only 37% of the workforce and no women were CEOs, is one of relatively few women executives (and only a handful of Americans) at her level. In 2011, Crawford joined the advisory board of the European Professional Women's Network.

=== Awards and honors ===
In 2010, largely because of changes made by Crawford to Air Liquide's global R&D operations, the global management consulting firm A.T. Kearney and the French economic newspaper Les Échos presented Air Liquide with their Best Innovator award, which recognizes companies that integrate strategy, organization, culture and performance into their innovation process. The jury cited the alignment of the Air Liquide innovation strategy with the overall strategy of the group, as well as its structured innovation process, which is shared and open to its partners.

In 2011, Crawford was nominated as Woman of the Year in the Green Business category by the French financial newspaper La Tribune.

Crawford was made a chevalier in the National Order of Merit (France) in May 2012.

== Selected bibliography ==
In addition to being lead author on 16 country volumes in the OECD Environmental Performance Review series from 1999 to 2008, Crawford has written or co-written, among other publications:

Heitzmann, M. (2011) "Von natülichen Kohlen-wasserstoffen zu Produkten," Chapter 8 in Energie und Rohstoffe, Spektrum Adademischer Verlag, Heidelberg.

Heitzmann, M. (2010) "Managing Expertise in a World-wide Technology Company," in Commerce in France, American Chamber of Commerce quarterly magazine (March).

Heitzmann, M. (2009) "Air Liquide dévoile son réseau de R&D," in Innovation: L'Economie de la Croissance, 20:14-20 (March).

Rogers, P., Heitzmann, M. et al. (1997) Measuring Environmental Quality in Asia. Harvard University Press, Cambridge, MA.

Crawford, M. and Wilson, R. (1996) "Low-Dose Linearity: The Rule of the Exception?" in Human and Ecological Risk Assessment International 2(2): 305-330.

Crawford, M. (1993) "Sustainable Development in the Pacific Island Nations," in Environmental Science and Technology 27(12): 2286-2290.

Crawford, M. J. (1992) Republic of the Marshall Islands National Environmental Management Strategy, Parts A & B. Developed with RMI National Taskforce on Environmental Management and Sustainable Development, Asian Development Bank.

Crawford, M., Holthus, P. et al. (1992) Vulnerability Assessment to Accelerated Sea Level Rise: Case Study of Majuro Atoll. US National Oceanic and Atmospheric Administration and South Pacific Regional Environment Program.
