= David Hutchins =

British forester

Sir David Ernest Hutchins FRGS (22 September 1850 – 11 November 1920) was a British forestry expert who worked around the British Empire.

Hutchins was educated at Blundell's School and the National School of Water Resources and Forestry (French: École nationale des eaux et forêts) at Nancy, France. He then joined the Imperial Forestry Service in India, in which he served for ten years; then the South African Forest Service for another twenty-three years. There he recommended that a forestry service be started in the Transvaal and that certain Mexican pine species, such as Pinus patula, be cultivated. He finally served three years in the British East Africa Forest Service, from which he retired as Chief Conservator of Forests. In 1908 and 1909, he explored the forests around Mount Kenya.

After his retirement, he reported on the forests of Cyprus in 1909 for the Colonial Office, toured the forests of Australia in 1914–1915 for the government of Western Australia, and in 1916 toured the forests of New Zealand to compile a report for the country's government.

He was knighted in the 1920 New Year Honours.

Brachylaena hutchinsii, a species of African tree in the family Asteraceae, was originally named after him.
