= Rykiel =

Rykiel is a surname. Notable people with the surname include:

- Jean-Philippe Rykiel (born 1961), French musician
- Sonia Rykiel (1930–2016), French fashion designer and writer
