= École nationale supérieure des industries agricoles et alimentaires =

French grande école of agriculture

The École Nationale Supérieure des Industries Agricoles et Alimentaires (French pronunciation: [ekɔl nɑsjɔnal sypeʁjœʁ dez‿ɛ̃dystʁi aɡʁikɔl e alimɑ̃tɛːʁ]), or ENSIA, was a French grande école of agriculture, located in Massy, near Paris. It was affiliated to the Ministry of Agriculture. The school was founded in 1893 and merged into AgroParisTech in 2006.

After initial training in food science and engineering, students are able to contribute to research / production project and development of the food industries. The ENSIA graduate has the know-how in industrial processes, food product, quality and management.

Research at ENSIA is strongly associated with teams from national scientific research institutes (INRA, CNRS, CIRAD, CEMAGREF, ...) and universities. ENSIA also develops partnerships with various food companies.

Initial training :

- Received Master's degree (Food Science Engineer Diploma) in food engineering
- Received Master's degree (Food Science Engineer Diploma) in food engineering specialized in Mediterranean and tropical agro-products.
- Received Master of Science in Mediterranean and tropical food science and technology
- Asian-European master's degree programme in food science and technology (taught in English in SEA).

PhD programmes

- Food science
- Food process engineering
- Biology and microbiology

Continuous education

- Professional master's degree
- 350 students
- 100 graduate students conducting research
- 50 teachers-researchers
- 70 technical and administrative staff

== See also ==
- Universities in Île-de-France
