= Pierre Mouillefert =

French botanist

- Born: 1846
- Died: 1903 (aged 56–57)
- Scientific career
- Fields: Dendrology

Pierre Mouillefert was a French botanist who specialized in dendrology, the study of trees. He was professor of silviculture at l'École nationale d'Agriculture de Grignon, and the present-day Arboretum de Grignon. His herbarium and some of his publications were lost in 1940.
