= French National School of Forestry =

National technical school in France

Coordinates: 48.693°N 6.188°E

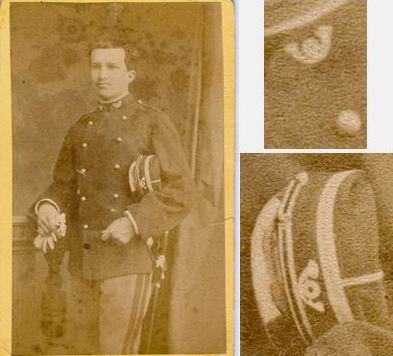
Nancy National Water and Forest School student in 2nd lieutenant forest hunter military corps uniform in 1889.

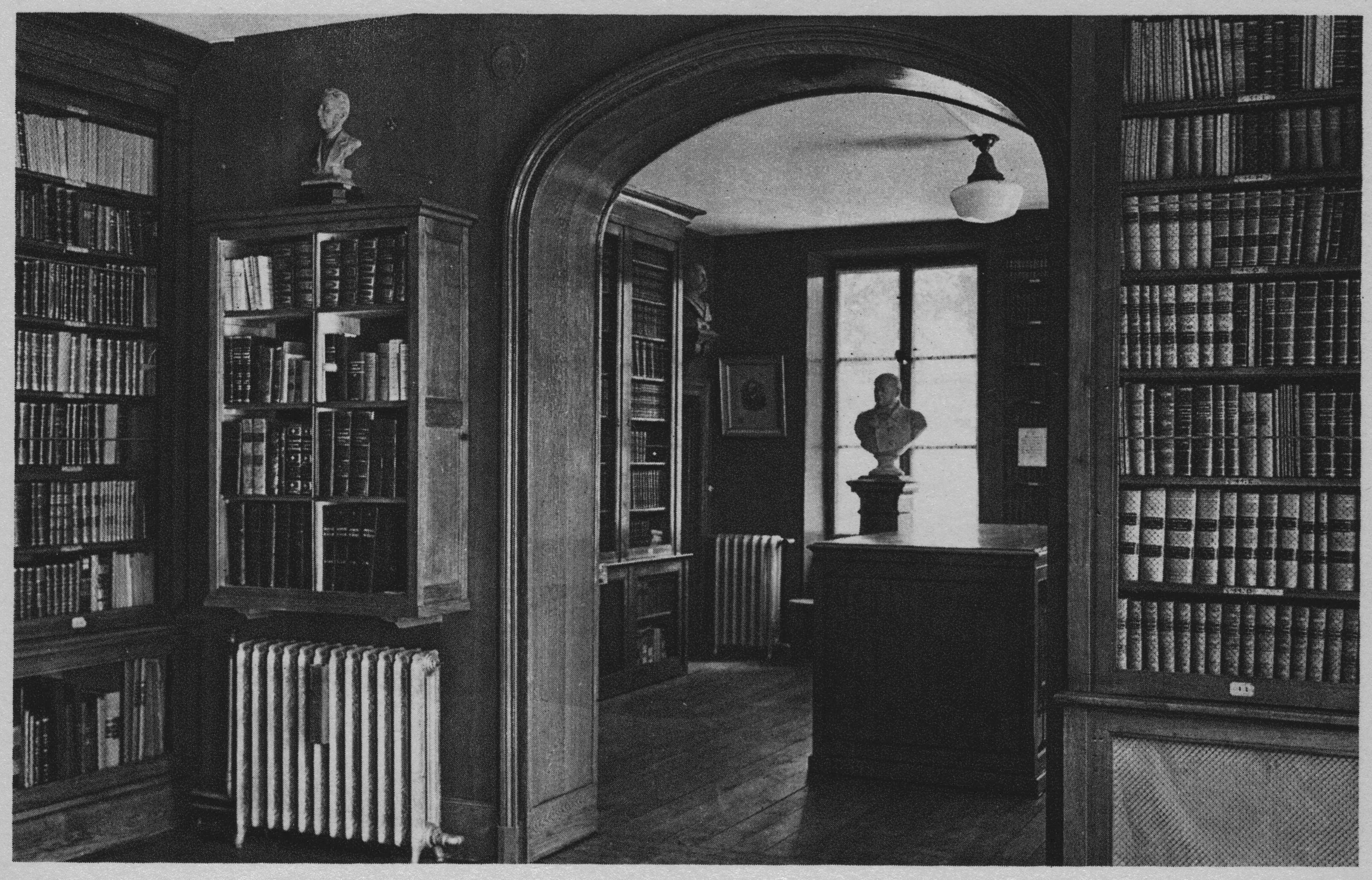
Library circa 1900 at the French National School of Forestry

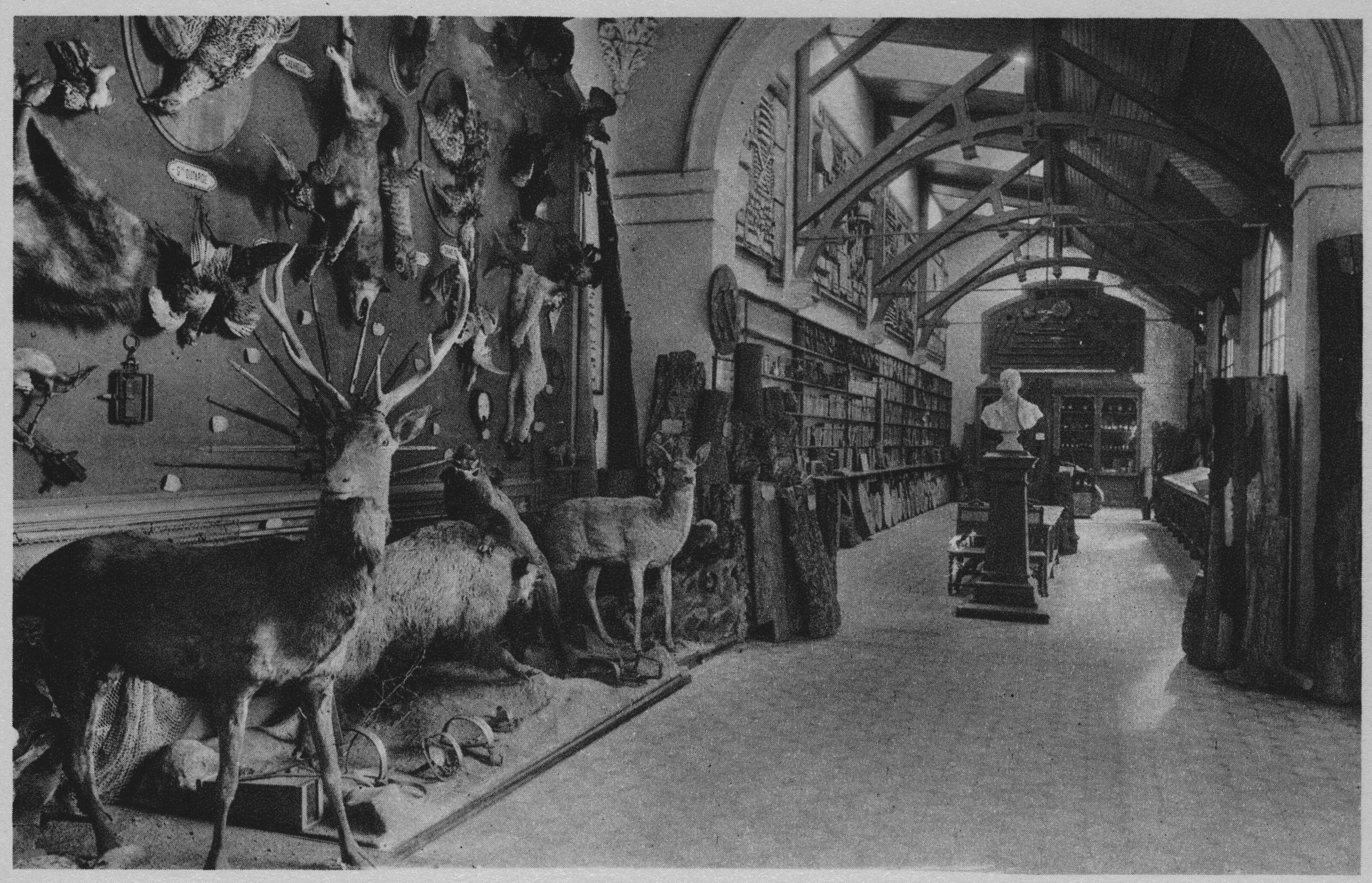
Fauna specimen circa 1900 at the French National School of Forestry

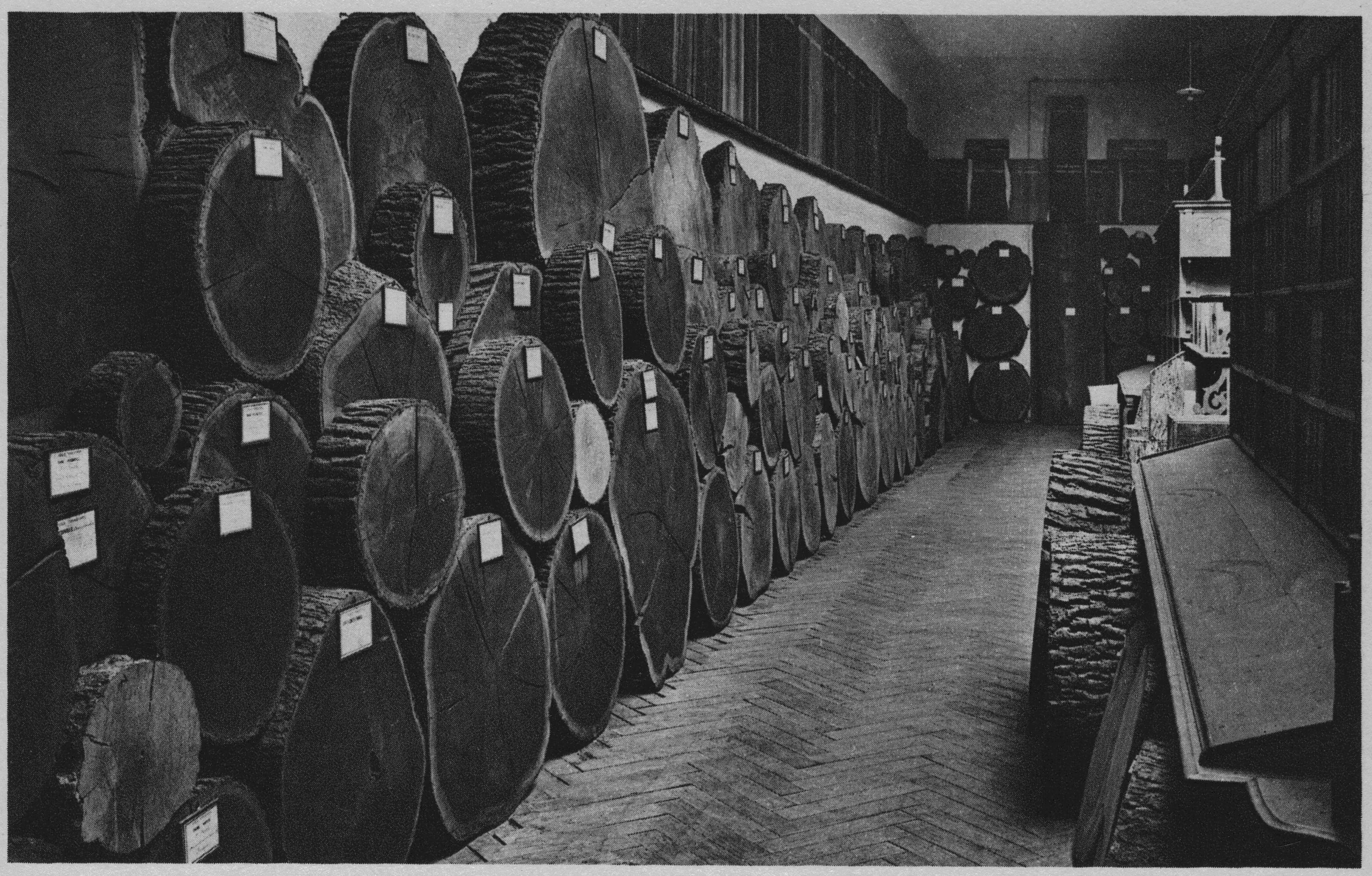
Wood specimen circa 1900 at the French National School of Forestry

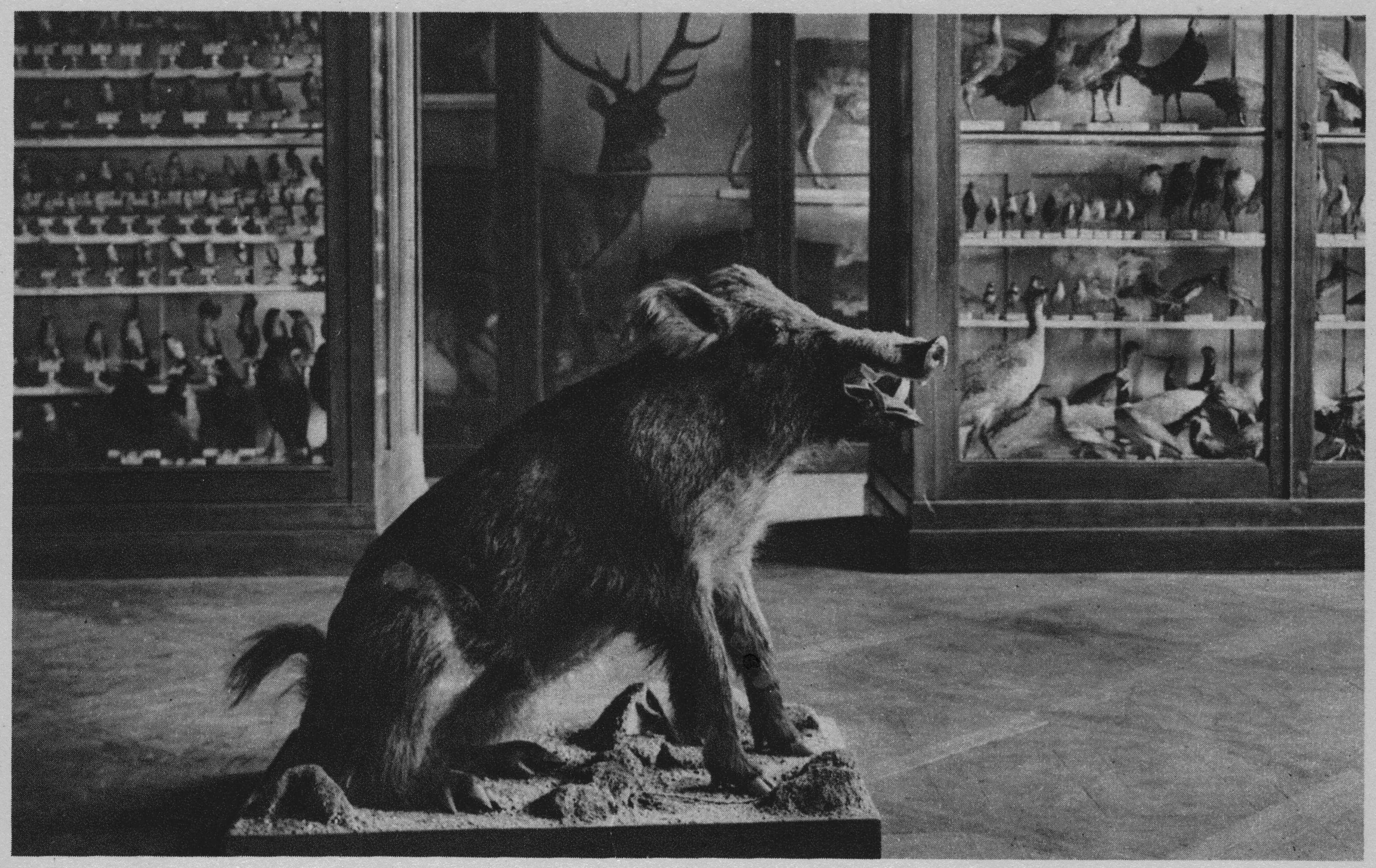
Sanglier specimen circa 1900 at the French National School of Forestry

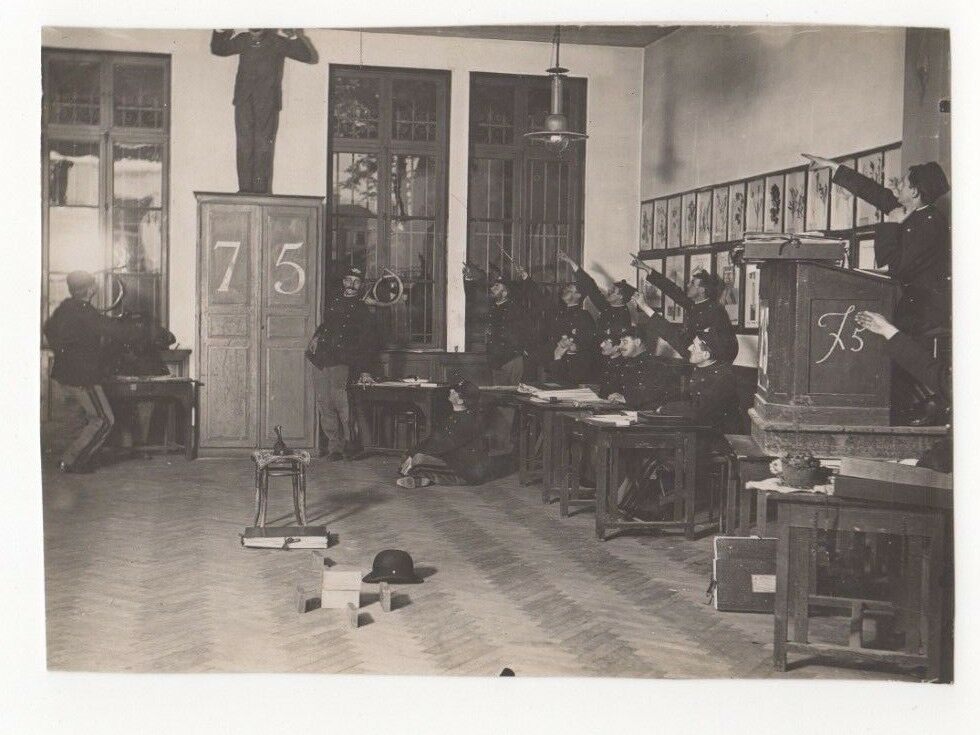
Class activity, French National School of FOrestry, ca 1900

The French National School of Forestry or National School of Water Resources and Forestry (French: École nationale des eaux et forêts, pronounced [ekɔl nɑsjɔnal dez‿o e fɔʁɛ]; abbr. ENEF), established in Nancy, France, in 1824, was the first national training institute for foresters in France, and a premier early school of forestry in Europe and globally.

In 1964, it was merged into the National School of Rural Engineering, Water Resources and Forestry (École nationale du génie rural, des eaux et des forêts, or ENGREF), which in turn became part of AgroParisTech (Institut des sciences et industries du vivant et de l’environnement, or Paris Institute of Technology for Life, Food and Environmental Sciences) in 2006.

== Notable alumni ==
- Georges Fabre
- Philibert Guinier
- James Sykes Gamble
- Augustine Henry
- David Hutchins
- Louis Lavauden
- Charles Lane Poole
- Gifford Pinchot
- Sir David Earnest Hutchins

== See also ==
- Agro ParisTech
- List of historic schools of forestry
