= Impala SAS =

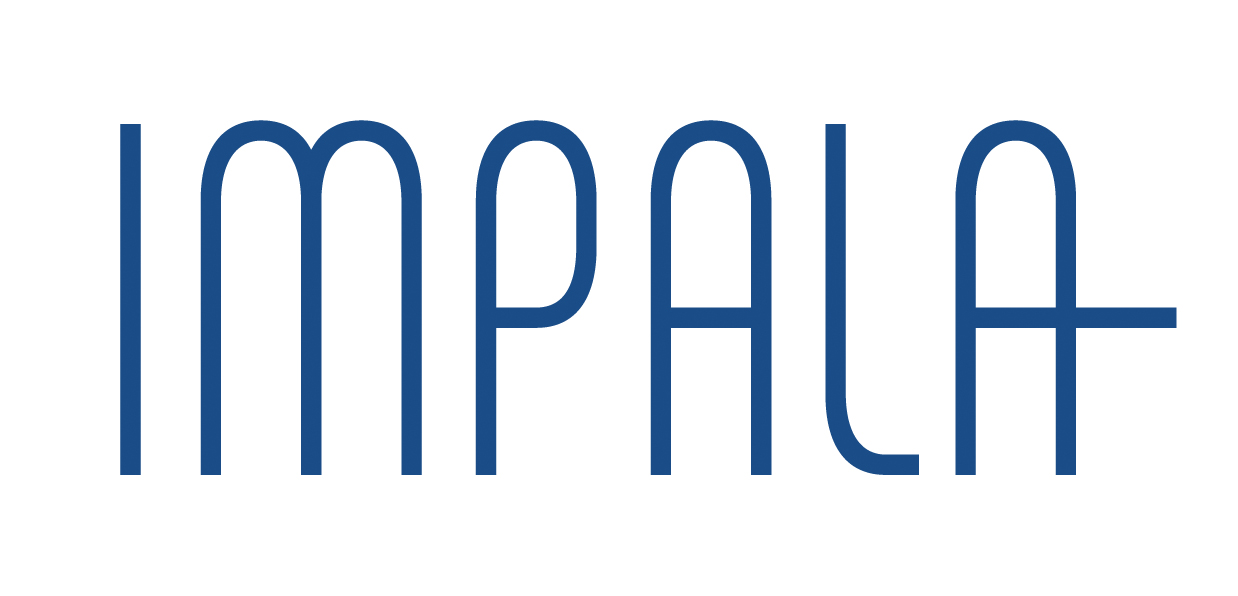
- Company type: Simplified joint-stock company
- Industry: Energy, Asset management, Manufacturing, Brands
- Founded: France (2011)
- Founder: Jacques Veyrat
- Headquarters: Paris, France
- Area served: Worldwide
- Key people: Jacques Veyrat
- Number of employees: 6,000 (2013)
- Website: impala-sas.com

Impala is a diversified company in energy, manufacturing, brands and asset management. In 2013, total group invested over €300 million. Group companies employ approximately 6,000 people. Impala SAS was founded by Jacques Veyrat after stepping down as CEO of the global conglomerate Louis Dreyfus.

== Activity ==
Impala builds controlling interests in projects with high international growth potential operating in four industries: energy, manufacturing, brands and asset management.

== Main Investments ==
- Direct Énergie : 3rd largest electricity and natural gas supplier on the French market
- Neoen : Power producer from renewable energy sources
- Castleton Commodities International : Established global commodities merchant
- Eiffel Investment Group : Alternative asset investor
- CPI : Largest manufacturer of monochrome books in Europe
- Technoplus Industries : Manufacturer of critical mechanical components
- Electropoli : European leader in surface finishing on metal substrates
- Clestra : Manufacturer and installer of office partitions
- Pull-in : Underwear and swimwear brand

== Governance ==
The group's chairman is Jacques Veyrat, the CEO is Fabrice Dumonteil.
