= Jacques Veyrat =

French businessman (born 1962)

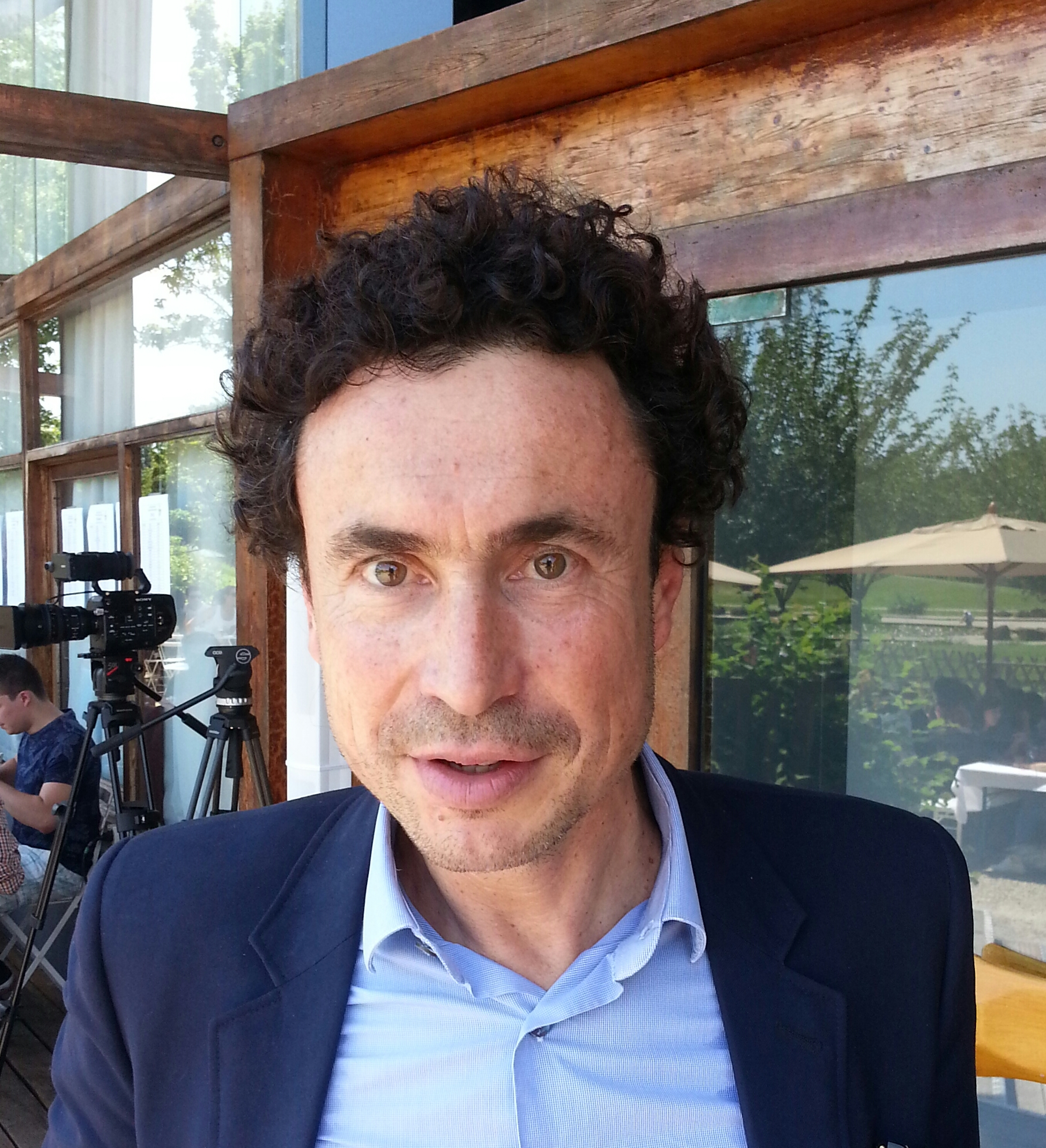
- Veyrat in 2016
- Born: 4 November 1962 (age 63); Chambéry, Savoie, Auvergne-Rhône-Alpes, France
- Occupation: Businessman

Jacques Veyrat (born 1962) is a French businessman.

== Early life ==
Jacques Veyrat was born on 4 November 1962 in Chambéry, Savoie, France. He earned a master of science degree from the École Polytechnique in 1983 and a master of science degree in Civil Engineering from École des ponts ParisTech in 1988 and an MBA from Collège des Ingénieurs in 1989.

== Career ==
Veyrat served as the chief executive officer of Neuf Cegetel from 2005 to 2007. He served as the chief executive officer of the Louis Dreyfus Group from 2009 to 2011. He founded Impala SAS in 2011. By 2013, he was the owner of CPI and Technoplus Industries.

He serves on the advisory board of Sotheby's.

According to Challenges, he had an estimated wealth of €480 million in 2015.
