= Thiverval-Grignon =

- Commune
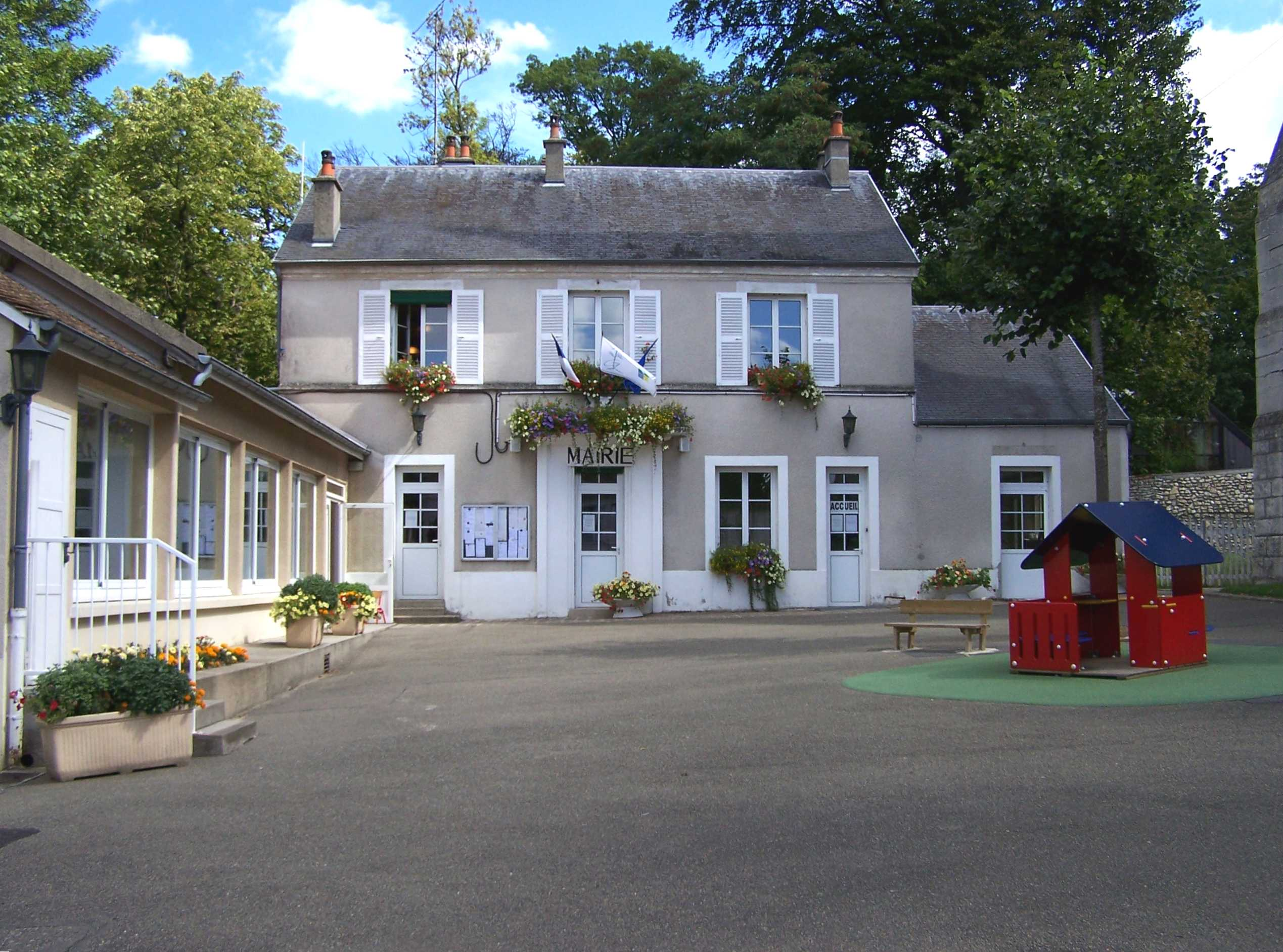
- Town hall

- Coat of arms
- Location of Thiverval-Grignon
- Location within France Location within Île-de-France (region)
- Coordinates: 48°51′07″N 1°55′05″E
- Country: France
- Region: Île-de-France
- Department: Yvelines
- Arrondissement: Rambouillet
- Canton: Plaisir
- Intercommunality: Cœur d'Yvelines

Government
  - Mayor (2020–2026): Nadine Gohard
- Area^{1}: 11.17 km^{2} (4.31 sq mi)
- Elevation: 77 m (253 ft)
- Highest elevation: 132 m (433 ft)
- Lowest elevation: 56 m (184 ft)
- Population (2023): 1,023
  - Density: 91.58/km^{2} (237.2/sq mi)
- Time zone: UTC+01:00 (CET)
  - Summer (DST): UTC+02:00 (CEST)
- INSEE/Postal code: 78615 /78850
- ^{1} French Land Register data, which excludes lakes, ponds, glaciers > 1 km^{2} (0.386 sq mi or 247 acres) and river estuaries.

Thiverval-Grignon (French pronunciation: [tivɛʁval ɡʁiɲɔ̃]) is a commune in the Yvelines department in the Île-de-France region in north-central France.

== Points of interest ==
- Arboretum de Grignon
- Jardin botanique de l'Institut National

== See also ==
- Communes of the Yvelines department
