= National School of Rural Engineering, Water Resources and Forestry =

Coordinates: 48.6937°N 6.1879°E

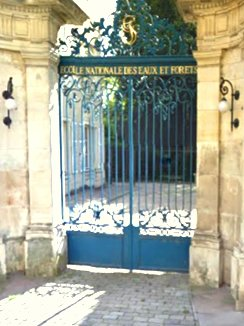
Gates of the ENGREF Campus in Nancy

The National School of Rural Engineering, Water Resources and Forestry (French: École nationale du génie rural, des eaux et des forêts, pronounced [ekɔl nɑsjɔnal dy ʒeni ʁyʁal dez‿o e de fɔʁɛ]; abbr. ENGREF) was an internal college of AgroParisTech for foresters and students of the Corps of Bridges, Waters and Forests. It was still an independent institution up until 2006.

It was created in 1964, from the merger of the French National School of Forestry (École nationale des eaux et forêts, or National School of Water Resources and Forestry) and the National School of Rural Engineering (École nationale du génie rural) and became part of AgroParisTech (Institut des sciences et industries du vivant et de l’environnement, or Paris Institute of Technology for Life, Food and Environmental Sciences) in 2006.

== See also ==
- Agro ParisTech
- French National School of Forestry
- List of historic schools of forestry
