= AgroParisTech =

French higher education institution

Coordinates: 48°50′23″N 2°20′54″E

Paris Institute of Technology for Life, Food and Environmental Sciences Paris-Saclay University
- Institut national des sciences et industries du vivant et de l'environnement
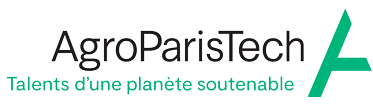
- Motto: "Talents d'une planète soutenable"
- Motto in English: "Talents for a sustainable planet"
- Type: Public
- Established: 2007 (merger of 3 grandes écoles)
- Parent institution: Paris-Saclay University
- Director: Laurent Buisson
- Administrative staff: 230
- Students: 2,420
- Doctoral students: 420
- Location: Paris and Paris region (Grignon, Massy), Nancy, Montpellier, Kourou, France
- Campus: 9 campuses (4 in Paris and the greater Paris area). The campuses of Paris area will be moved into a single campus in Paris-Saclay in 2021
- Website: http://www.agroparistech.fr/

AgroParisTech (French pronunciation: [aɡʁopaʁitɛk]; officially Institut national des sciences et industries du vivant et de l’environnement, or Paris Institute of Technology for Life, Food and Environmental Sciences) is a French higher education institution, known as a grande école. It is a constituent member of the Paris-Saclay University. It was founded on January 1, 2007, by the merger of three life sciences grandes écoles (INA P-G, ENGREF and ENSIA).

AgroParisTech is one of the founding members of the Université Paris-Saclay, which will be the largest European multidisciplinary campus. AgroParisTech will consequently be moving to the Paris-Saclay business and research-intensive cluster in 2021.

AgroParisTech is a part of the Paris-Saclay University and a member of the Paris Institute of Technology (ParisTech). The latter is a consortium of ten graduate institutes of science and engineering. AgroParisTech is also part of 'The Life and Environmental Science and Technology Hub' of the Paris region, together with INRAE, Cemagref, AFSSA, École nationale vétérinaire d'Alfort and the Versailles National School of Landscape architecture.

== History ==
AgroParisTech is the merger of three graduate institutes of science and engineering located around Paris:

- Institut National Agronomique Paris-Grignon (INA P-G), founded in 1826
- École nationale du génie rural, des eaux et des forêts (ENGREF), founded in 1964
- École Nationale Supérieure des Industries Agricoles et Alimentaires (ENSIA), founded in 1893.

The public higher education system in France includes universities and other institutions called the grande école. The grandes écoles are the best rated pathways for higher education in Engineering and Management. The vast majority of the chief executives in major French companies and of top managers in the French Administration are graduates from the grandes écoles. The features are:

- A very selective admission process through which students are either admitted by a nationwide entrance exam (notably after two or three years of prépas) or by the virtue of excellent academic records
- 5 years (Master’s degrees) to 8 years (PhD and post-Master’s degrees) of higher education
- The degree course at the grandes écoles includes compulsory internships in laboratories and companies, in France or abroad
- The prestige of the grandes écoles and contacts with major companies provide an easy access to the job market

The university includes a museum, which has objects on loan from institutions in Wallis and Futuna, such as Uvea Museum Association, including a coca cola bottle dating to 1942.

== Organization ==
AgroParisTech is organized into five departments:

- Agronomy, Forestry, Water and Environmental Science and Technology,
- Life Science and Health,
- Science and Engineering for Food and Bioproducts,
- Social science, Economics and Management,
- Modeling: Mathematics, Informatics and Physics

== Academic programs ==
AgroParisTech offers different Masters:

- 3 different Masters of Engineering (MEng):
  - Agronomy
  - Food Science and Engineering
  - Forestry
- 2 Masters of Science (MSc)
- 1 Master's program with 5 domains that cover most fields of Life Science and Technology
- one of 7 partner universities in the Master of Science in European Forestry program

It also offers:

- a wide range of Ph.D. programs.
- 1 Post-Master's degree for Management and Administration in environmental sciences and policies, proposed by ENGREF, a post-graduate institute of AgroParisTech.
- 9 Post-master professional certificates (one-year post graduate training)

== Research programmes ==
AgroParisTech has:

- 39 research laboratories,
- 300 researchers

== See also ==
- National School of Rural Engineering, Water Resources and Forestry
- French National School of Forestry
- Agrocampus Ouest
- SupAgro
