= Établissement public à caractère administratif =

An établissement public à caractère administratif (French pronunciation: [etablismɑ̃ pyblik a kaʁaktɛʁ administʁatif], lit. 'public establishment of an administrative nature'; EPA) is, in France, a public law legal person with a certain administrative and financial autonomy to fulfil a mission of public interest (that is not industrial or commercial in nature) under the control of the State or a local authority.

It is a category of public undertaking in France, and includes some research institutes and infrastructure operators. As opposed to the Établissements publics à caractère industriel et commercial, which are subject to private law, EPAs are mainly governed by public law. This legal distinction is recognised by the French precedent.

== Different types ==
EPAs under the supervision of the Ministry of Armed Forces include:

- The Institut supérieur de l'aéronautique et de l'espace (ISAE)
- The ENSTA ParisTech
- The École nationale supérieure de techniques avancées Bretagne (ENSTA Bretagne)
- The École Polytechnique
- The Naval Hydrographic and Oceanographic Service (SHOM)
- The Établissement de communication et de production audiovisuelle de la Défense (ECPAD)
- The Établissement public d'insertion de la défense (EPIDE)
- The Musée de l'Armée
- The Musée national de la Marine
- The Musée de l'Air
- The Académie de Marine
- The Etablissement public national des fonds de prévoyance militaire et de l'aéronautique

EPA under the supervision of the Ministry of the Interior:

- The Right of Asylum in France (OFPRA).
- The Conseil national des activités privées de sécurité (CNAPS).

EPA under the supervision of the Ministry of Labour, Employment and Economic Inclusion:

- The Agence Nationale pour l'Amélioration des Conditions de Travail

EPA under the supervision of the Ministry of the Economy, Finance and Recovery:

- Mines ParisTech
- The École Nationale Supérieure des Mines de Saint-Étienne
- The École des Mines de Douai
- The École des mines d'Alès
- The École des mines de Nantes
- The École des Mines d'Albi-Carmaux

EPA under the supervision of the Ministry of Higher Education, Research and Innovation:

- The Groupe Concours Polytechniques
- 4 of the 5 Groupe des écoles nationales d’ingénieurs (Groupe ENI):
  - École nationale d'ingénieurs de Brest,
  - École nationale d'ingénieurs de Metz,
  - École nationale d'ingénieurs de Tarbes,
  - École nationale d'ingénieurs du Val de Loire.
- 7 of the 9 Institut d'études politiques
- The École Nationale Supérieure de l'Électronique et de ses Applications
- The École nationale supérieure d'informatique pour l'industrie et l'entreprise
- The Institut français de mécanique avancée
- The École nationale supérieure de la nature et du paysage
- The École nationale supérieure des arts et techniques du théâtre
- The Louis Lumière College
- The Côte d'Azur Observatory
- The Jean-François Champollion University Center for Teaching and Research
- The Institut national supérieur de formation et de recherche pour l'éducation des jeunes handicapés et les enseignements adaptés;
- The National Computer Center for Higher Education (France) (CINES)

EPA under the supervision of the Ministry of National Education, Youth and Sports and of the Ministry of Higher Education, Research and Innovation:

- The Centre international d'études pédagogiques (CIEP)
- The Centre national d'enseignement à distance (CNED)

EPA under the supervision of the Ministry of Agriculture and Food:

- The Établissement national des produits de l'agriculture et de la mer (FranceAgriMer)
- The Agence de services et de paiement (ASP)
- The Institut français du cheval et de l'équitation
- The Inventaire Forestier National (IFN);

EPA under the supervision of the Ministry of the Ecological Transition:

- The Agence nationale de l'habitat (Anah);
- The six Agence de l'eau;
- The École des Ponts ParisTech;
- The École nationale de l'aviation civile (ÉNAC);
- The Institut Géographique National (IGN);
- Météo-France;
- The French Office for Biodiversity (OFB).

EPA under the supervision of the Ministry of Europe and Foreign Affairs:

- The Agency for French Teaching Abroad (AEFE).

EPA under the supervision of the Ministry of Culture:

- The Bibliothèque nationale de France;
- The bibliothèque publique d'information;
- The Centre des monuments nationaux;
- The Centre Georges Pompidou;
- The Centre national des arts plastiques;
- The National Center of Cinematography and the moving image;
- The Centre national du livre;
- The Cité nationale de l'histoire de l'immigration;
- The CNSAD;
- The Conservatoire de Paris;
- The Conservatoire national supérieur de musique et de danse de Lyon;
- The École du Louvre;
- The écoles nationales supérieure d'architecture;
- The école nationale supérieure d'arts de Cergy-Pontoise;
- The École nationale supérieure de la photographie;
- The École nationale supérieure des arts décoratifs;
- The École nationale supérieure des Beaux-Arts;
- The opérateur du patrimoine et des projets immobiliers de la culture;
- The Institut national du patrimoine (INP);
- The Institut national de recherches archéologiques préventives (INRAP);
- The Palace of Fontainebleau;
- The Guimet Museum;
- The Musée national Jean-Jacques Henner;
- The Sèvres – Cité de la céramique;
- The Musée du Louvre;
- The Musée national Gustave Moreau;
- The Musée d'Orsay;
- The Musée Picasso;
- The Musée Rodin;
- The Établissement public du château, du musée et du domaine national de Versailles

EPA under the supervision of the Ministry of Health:

- The École nationale supérieure de sécurité sociale (EN3S)

EPA under the supervision of the Ministry of Territorial Development:

- The Institut national des études territoriales;

Not classified:

- IAE Paris
- The Institut des hautes études de défense nationale (IHEDN)
- The French Academy of Technologies
- The Agence centrale des organismes de sécurité sociale (ACOSS)
- The Agence nationale de sécurité sanitaire de l'alimentation, de l'environnement et du travail (ANSES)
- The Agence Nationale de la Recherche (ANR)
- The AD Isère Drac Romanche
- The Centre d'études et de recherches sur les qualifications (CEREQ)
- The Institut national supérieur de formation et de recherche pour l'éducation des jeunes handicapés et les enseignements adaptés (CNEFEI)
- The Centre national des œuvres universitaires et scolaires (CNOUS) and the Centre régional des œuvres universitaires et scolaires (CROUS)
- The Caisse nationale de solidarité pour l'autonomie (CNSA)
- The Centre de ressources, d'expertise et de performance sportives (CREPS)
- Chamber of Commerce and Industry (CCI)
- The Service départemental d'incendie et de secours (SDIS)
- Île-de-France Mobilités (IDFM)
- Association syndicale autorisée.

== See also ==
- Water agency (France)
