= École nationale d'ingénieurs du Val de Loire =

Coordinates: 47°35′04″N 1°19′33″E

École nationale d'ingénieurs du Val de Loire - ENIVL
- Type: Public-École d'ingénieurs (EPA)
- Established: 1993
- Affiliations: ENI Group; University of Tours
- President: Romuald Boné
- Students: 490
- Location: Blois, France
- Website: http://www.enivl.fr

The École nationale d'ingénieurs du Val de Loire (ENIVL) is a French grande école leading to the French “Diplôme d’Ingénieur” under the authority of the French Ministry of Education and Research. It is a public school accredited by the Commission for engineering qualifications (CTI) to deliver an engineering degree. The ENIVL is a 5-year school.

In September 2014, ENIVL became a member of the network of the National Institutes of Applied Sciences (INSA), merging with the National School of Engineers of Bourges (ENSIB) to give INSA Val de Loire.

== Admission ==
The first year admission to the ENIVL is made through a selective examination during the year leading to the baccalauréat (S serie). To enter the school for 2nd, 3rd and 4th year, admission is through various examinations: E3a, ENSEA, and Banque PT.

== Study Program ==
- 2 years Preparatory course
- 3 years Engineering Cycle including a 6-months internship

The ENVL trains multipurpose generalist engineers and land intended for the production function: Design, manufacturing, maintenance, purchasing, procurement, management of internal flows, analytical management, logistics, people management, methods, ...

== Specialization ==
At the ENIVL

- Industrial purchasing engineering (IAI)
- Operational Safety and Industrial Systems (SDF-SI)
- Production methods, Automotive, Transport (PMAT)
  - Production and Methods (PM)
  - Automotive and Transportation (AT)
- Automated Systems, Industrial Computing and Instrumentation (SA3I)
  - Instrumentation and Automated Systems course (ISA)
  - Computer Science and Industrial Systems (ISI)

Partnership with another ENI

- Logistics and Industrial Management (LGI)

Partnership with foreign universities

- Biomedical Engineering (Germany, Scotland)
- Mechanical and Aerospace (Argentina)
- Acoustics (Spain)
- French (USA)

== International ==
- In 2010/2011 124 of 465 students are on mobility
- 35 partnership agreements with foreign universities
- 72% mobility offerings are submitted by school

== Research Laboratories ==
- LMR laboratory (Laboratory of Mechanics and Rheology)
- The ACOUSTIC and piezoelectric POLE is a component of GREMAN (Materials Research Group, Microelectronics, and Nanotechnologies Acoustic), a laboratory associated with CNRS.

== See also ==
- Grandes Ecoles
- Diplome d'ingénieur
- ENI Group
- Engineer
- Baccalauréat
