= Agence nationale de la recherche =

The Agence Nationale de la Recherche (ANR, fr: National Agency for Research) is a French institution tasked with funding scientific research. It was founded on 7 February 2005 as a groupement d'intérêt public, and has acquired the status of établissement public à caractère administratif on 1 August 2006.

The ANR funds scientific teams, both public and private, in the form of short-term research contracts. Its budget was 350 million Euros in 2005, rose to 955M€ in 2009 but then fell to 703M€ in 2019. The ANR was supervised by Jacques Stern from 2007 until 2010 and by Eva Pebay-Peyroula since 2010.
