= List of national parks of France =

French national parks in red, regional parks in green, marine parks in blue

The national parks of France are a system of eleven national parks throughout metropolitan France and its overseas departments, coordinated by National Parks of France (French: Parcs nationaux de France) within the French Office for Biodiversity (Office français pour la biodiversité), an établissement public à caractère administratif guided by the Ministry of Ecological Transition and Ministry of Agriculture and Food.

The first national park was established in 1963; the most recent park was established in 2019. National parks are created by decree with the signature of the Prime Minister of France and publication in the Journal Officiel de la République Française.

French national parks protect a total area of 26,168 square kilometres (10,104 sq mi) in core area and 30,651 square kilometres (11,834 sq mi) in buffer zones. This puts over 9.5% of French territory under the protection of national parks; 29.5% of French lands and 22% of French waters are covered by some level of protection. French national parks draw over 8.5 million visitors annually.

== List ==
Name	Photograph	Department(s)	Core area	Buffer zone	Established
Calanques National Park (Parc national des Calanques)		Bouches-du-Rhône	520 km^{2} (201 sq mi)	1,060 km^{2} (409 sq mi)	18 April 2012
Cévennes National Park (Parc national des Cévennes)		Lozère, Gard, Ardèche and Aveyron	937 km^{2} (362 sq mi)	2,793 km^{2} (1,078 sq mi)	2 September 1970
Écrins National Park (Parc national des Écrins)		Isère and Hautes-Alpes	925 km^{2} (357 sq mi)	1,788 km^{2} (690 sq mi)	27 March 1973
Forêts National Park (Parc national des forêts)		Haute-Marne and Côte-d'Or	560 km^{2} (216 sq mi)	1,850 km^{2} (714 sq mi)	8 November 2019
Guadeloupe National Park (Parc national de la Guadeloupe)		Guadeloupe (overseas department)	221 km^{2} (85 sq mi)	2,244 km^{2} (866 sq mi)	20 February 1989
Guiana Amazonian Park (Parc amazonien de Guyane)		French Guiana (overseas department)	20,236 km^{2} (7,813 sq mi)	13,615 km^{2} (5,257 sq mi)	27 February 2007
Mercantour National Park (Parc national du Mercantour)		Alpes-Maritimes and Alpes-de-Haute-Provence	679 km^{2} (262 sq mi)	1,467 km^{2} (566 sq mi)	18 August 1979
Port-Cros National Park (Parc national de Port-Cros)		Var	46 km^{2} (18 sq mi)	1,451 km^{2} (560 sq mi)	14 December 1963
Pyrénées National Park (Parc national des Pyrénées)		Hautes-Pyrénées and Pyrénées-Atlantiques	458 km^{2} (177 sq mi)	2,077 km^{2} (802 sq mi)	23 March 1967
Réunion National Park (Parc national de la Réunion)		Réunion (overseas department)	1,054 km^{2} (407 sq mi)	877 km^{2} (339 sq mi)	5 March 2007
Vanoise National Park (Parc national de la Vanoise)		Savoie	534 km^{2} (206 sq mi)	1,427 km^{2} (551 sq mi)	6 July 1963

== See also ==
- Regional natural parks of France
- List of national parks in the Alps
- Tourism in France
