= OR7 =

OR 7, OR7, or OR-7 may refer to:

- Oregon Route 7, a highway in the U.S. state of Oregon
- OR-7, a gray wolf being electronically tracked in the Northwest United States
