= Gray wolf population by country =

As of 2026, the global grey wolf population was estimated at 200,000–250,000. More recent regional censuses provide updated figures: a 2022 assessment estimated at least 21,500 wolves in Europe, about 19,000 of them in the European Union, a 58% increase over the previous decade. Once abundant over much of North America and Eurasia, the grey wolf inhabits a smaller portion of its former range because of widespread human encroachment and destruction of its habitat, and the resulting human-wolf encounters that sparked broad extirpation. Wolf reintroduction programs have been instituted where there is suitable wilderness. Considered as a whole, however, the grey wolf is regarded as being of least concern for extinction according to the IUCN. Wolves are protected in some areas, hunted for sport in others, or may be subject to extermination as perceived threats to people, livestock, and pets.

Wolves tend to quickly adapt to change, and are often referred to as an indicator species; a species delineating an ecoregion or indicating an environmental condition such as a disease outbreak, pollution, species competition or climate change. Wolves do not seem to be able to adapt as readily to expanding civilization as the way coyotes do. While human expansion has seen an increase in coyote population, it has caused a drop in wolves.

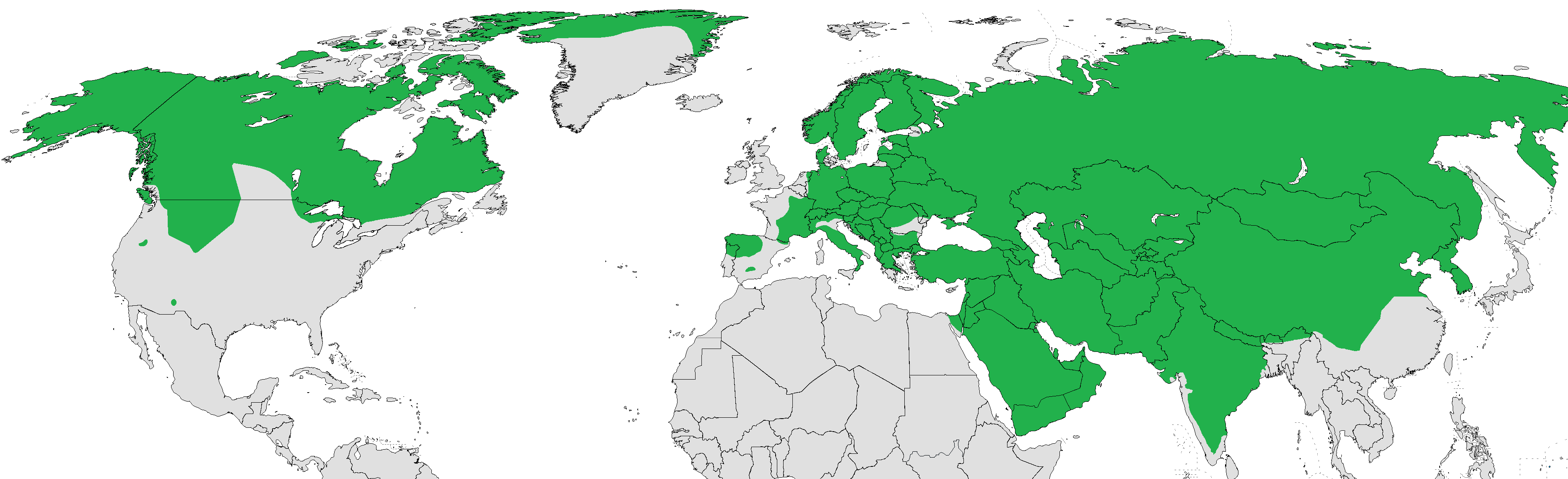

Present distribution (IUCN 2023)

== Europe ==
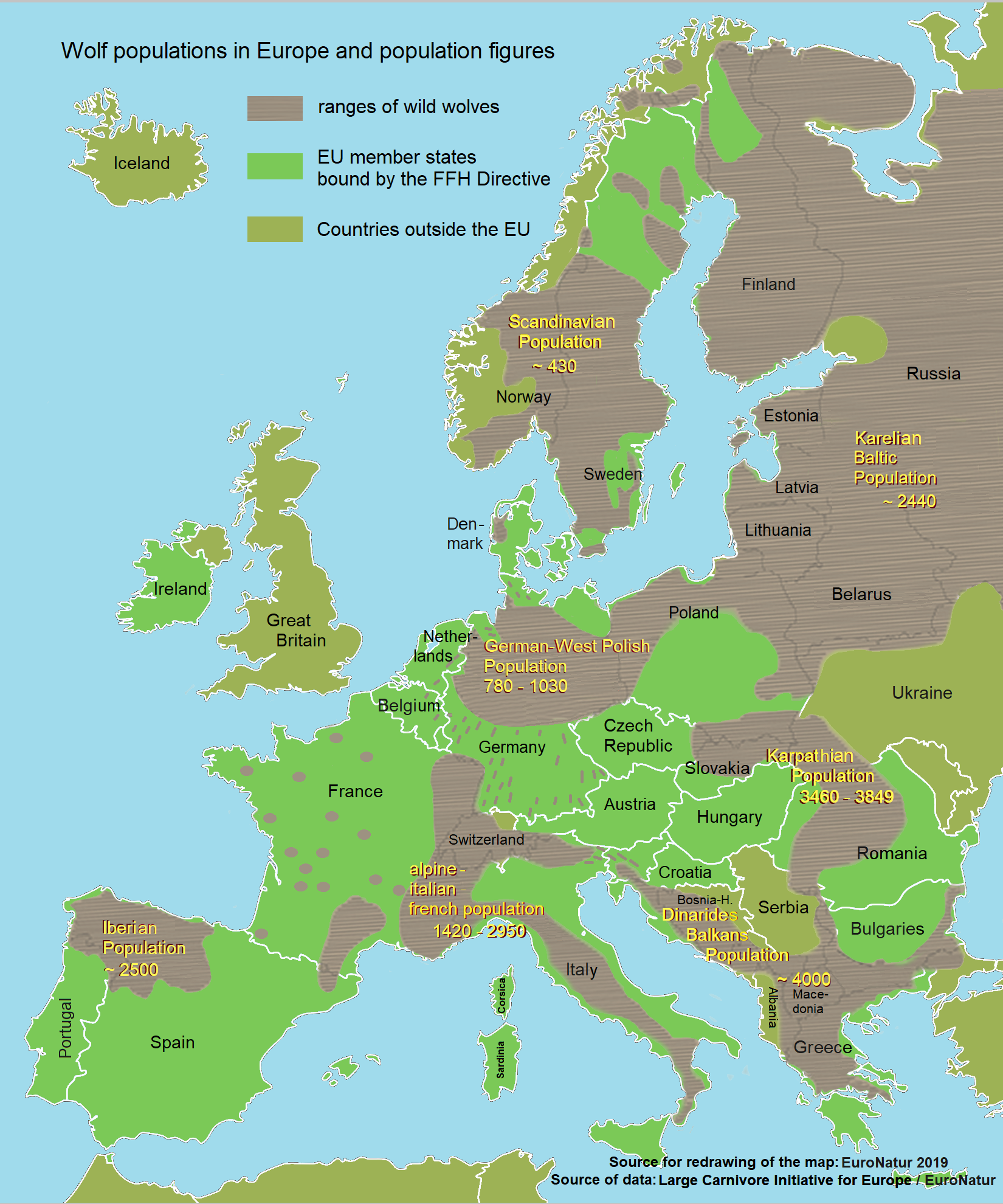
All populations, except that of Italy and Spain, are made up of the Eurasian wolf. Canis lupus italicus and Canis lupus signatus have been defined as separate subspecies.

Europe as of 2018 – excluding Russia, Belarus and Ukraine – has 17,000 wolves in over 28 countries.

An in-depth analysis of the situation of the wolf in the European Union was made in 2023 by J. C. Blanco and K. Sundseth.

As written in the document, there was a significant increase in wolf numbers in the EU between the previous assessment of the wolf, effectuated during 2013–2018, and the assessment done in 2023:

"According to the latest conservation status assessment [...], covering the reporting period 2013-2018, the wolf was reported to be present in 21 EU countries. Its overall EU population at that time was estimated at around 11,000 - 17,000 wolves. [...] In 2023, wolves have been detected across all EU Member States except Ireland, Cyprus and Malta, and there are breeding packs in 23 countries. In this analysis, 20 300 wolves have been estimated in 2023 across the EU."

Information on the number of wolves in the European Union across time is given in the table below from the document:

Number of wolves in the European Union (from Blanco and Sundseth, 2023).
Species Population/Year	2012	2022	2023
Grey Wolf	11,193	19,400	20,300

=== Austria ===
Austria's wolf population is increasing and is the home of 7 packs as of 2022.

The table below gives information on the size of the Austrian wolf population:

Number of wolves in Austria.
Species Population/Year	2013 - 2018	2022
Grey Wolf	29 - 36	58

=== Portugal ===
Portugal has a stable population of wolves distributed in 50 to 60 packs as of 2023.

Population numbers estimate across time is given from Blanco and Sundseth (2023) in the table below:

Number of wolves in Portugal.
Species Population/Year	2013 - 2018	2023
Grey Wolf	118	300

The wolf in Portugal is afforded full protection. Compensation is paid for livestock damage.

=== Spain ===
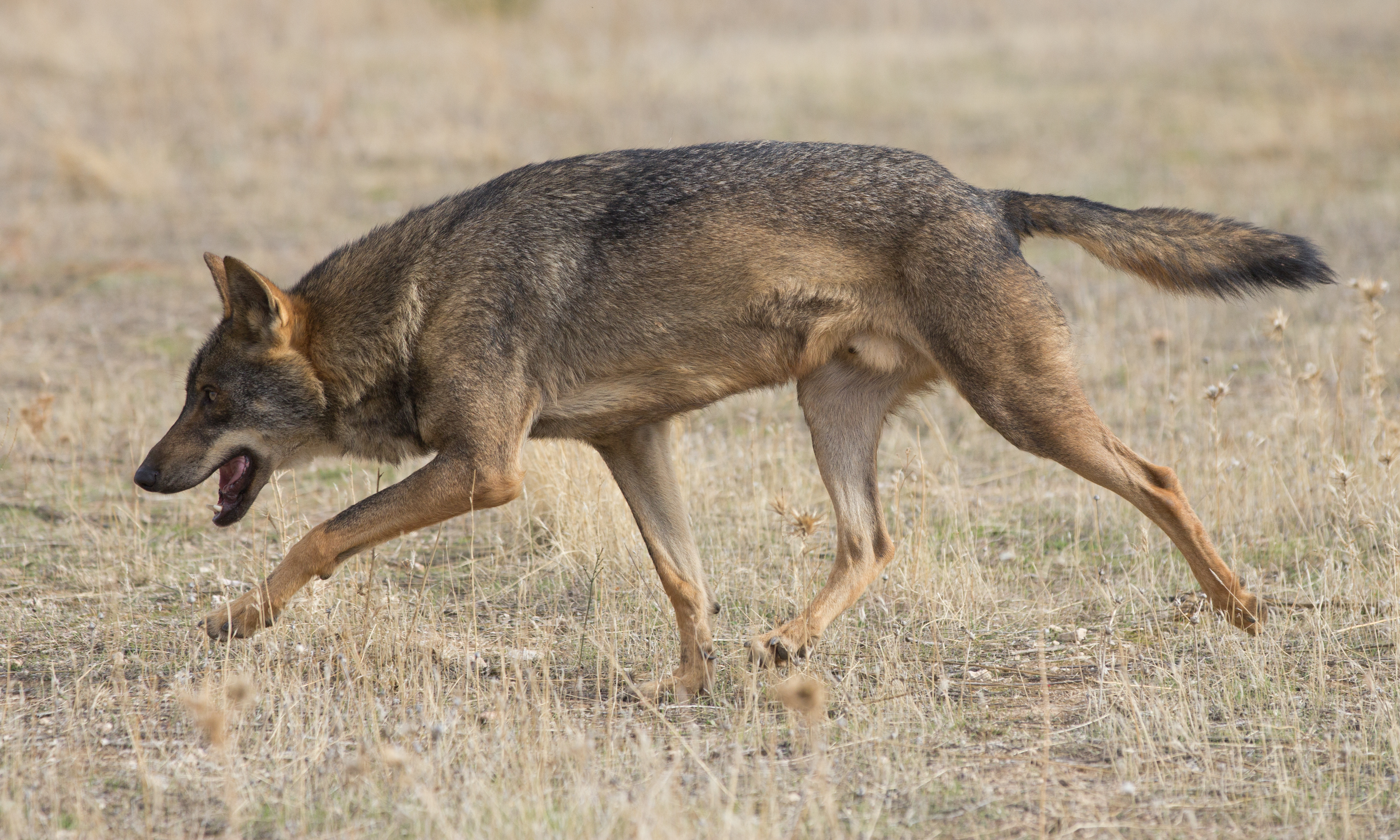
Iberian wolf (Canis lupus signatus) in semi-captivity in the Community of Madrid, Spain.

Spain's wolf population is estimated at 2,000–3,000 and growing. Their population is concentrated in two autonomous communities: around 700 in Galicia and 1,600 in Castille and León.

Wolves were considered a game species, though protected in the southern regions of the country. In February 2021, a hunting ban was enacted in the rural North as well. Compensation is paid for livestock damage, though this varies according to region. The population is expanding southwards and eastwards from the northwest, having recently reached Madrid, Ávila, Guadalajara and Salamanca. A southern relict population has survived in Andalusia, although contrary to the populations in the northwest and center of the country, it is not doing well.

=== Italy ===
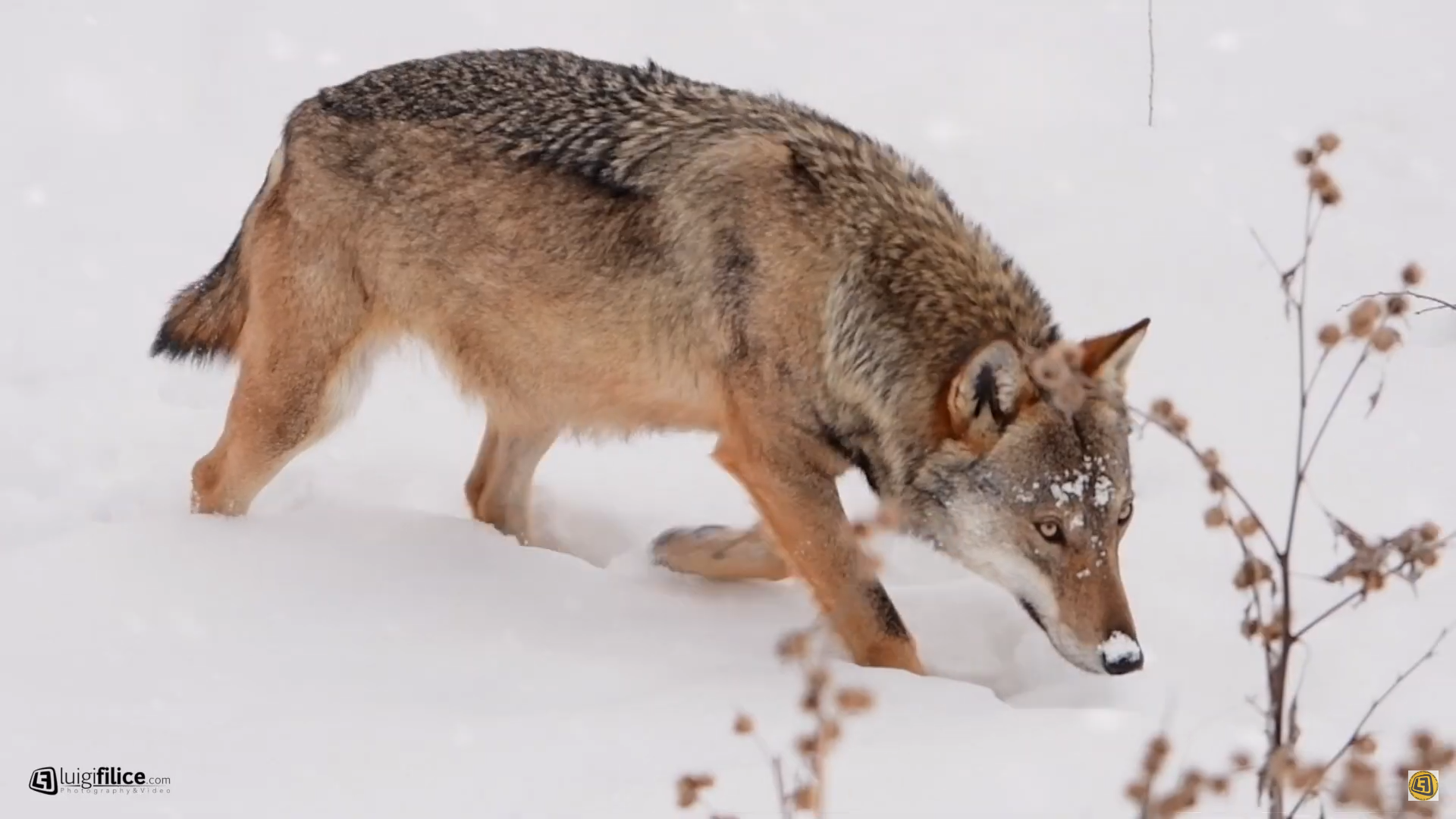
Italian wolf (Canis lupus italicus) in Abruzzo, Lazio e Molise National Park, Italy

Italy's wolves are a protected species with current estimates indicating that there are approximately 3,300 wolves living in the wild. The largest concentrations of wolves occur in the Italian national parks in Abruzzo, mostly in the Abruzzo, Lazio e Molise, in Calabria, in the Pollino and Sila, on Appennino Tosco-Emiliano, and, more recently, on the Alps. Isolated individuals have been sighted in the vicinity of human populated areas such as Tuscany, Bologna, Parma and Tarquinia. Wolves have also been sighted denning 25 miles from Rome, with one small population living in the regional park of Castelli Romani. Currently, Italian wolf populations are said to have been increasing at a rate of 6% a year since the 1970s, though 15% of the total Italian wolf population is reported to succumb annually to illegal poaching and road accidents. Compensation is paid by regional governments for livestock damage. Italy's leading wolf biologist, professor Luigi Boitani of the Sapienza University of Rome, expressed concern that the Italian wolf recovery may have been too successful, due to a large portion of the public refusing to concede to the possibility of rising wolf populations requiring management in the future.

Wolves from Italy started to disperse and colonize (or re-colonize) many adjacent countries starting in the 1990s. Today, the Italian population can be found in Italy, France, Austria, Switzerland, Slovenia, Liechtenstein and Germany.

=== France ===
Wolf recolonization of France started in the early 1990s, with some Italian wolves entering France in 1992.

Monitoring of wolves in France result from a large-scale national network of citizen scientists and scientists (over 4,000) who compile data on wolf incidence via many key observations (feces, sightings, carcass of prey, etc.) and transfer their finds to the coordinators of the 'Office de la Biodiversité' (OFB). This office, a public agency, is in charge of national monitoring and provides plentifully information on wolves. Alongside non-invasive studies, conducted since 1995, annual population estimates are available. The French wolf population at the end of the winter 2022/2023 consisted of an estimated 1,104 wolves, in 128 packs and a few other pairs. This is an increase of the population estimate of 926 to 1,096 wolves done by the OFB in 2021/2022.

Population numbers estimate across time is given from Blanco and Sundseth (2023) in the table below:

Number of wolves in France.
Species Population/Year	2013 - 2018	2023
Gray Wolf	387 - 477	1,104

Under the Berne Convention, wolves are listed as an endangered species and killing them is illegal. Official culls are permitted to protect farm animals so long as there is no threat to the national population as a whole.

=== Germany ===
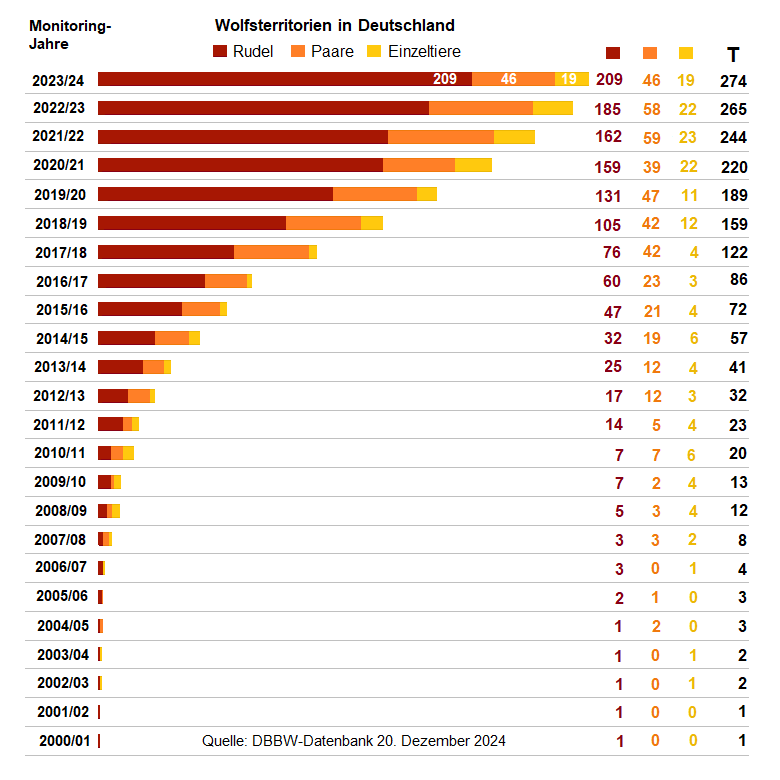
Development of the number of Wolf territories in Germany, 2000/2001 to 2020/2021, for packs (of at least 8) and couples

Germany's wolves were first spotted in 1998, and are thought to have migrated from western Poland.

In 2007, there were around 200 wolves in 36 packs roaming in Germany, most of them in the eastern German region of Lusatia. In July 2012, for the first time in 150 years, wolves were born in Heidekreis in Lower Saxony, which confirms the spread of wolves from the eastern part of Germany. In October 2014 Lower Saxony already had a wolf population of circa 50 animals: 5 packs, all with confirmed pups in 2014, 2 confirmed mated pairs and one territorial unpaired female. By August 2020 the number of packs in Lower Saxony had already risen to 35.

By 2020, Germany's total wolf population had grown to about 128 packs, most of them living in Brandenburg, Saxony and Lower Saxony. In these states, the density of wolves is higher than in Canada.

Between May 2022 and April 2023, 184 packs (of at least 8 wolves), 47 pairs and 22 loners were documented in Germany. Wolves are present in all 16 German states, including the city states of Berlin, Hamburg and Bremen, with the Saarland being the last state to confirm a wolf in September 2023. The gap to the wolf population in Eastern France is about to close.

Under German (and international) law wolves are a protected species; in several regions livestock damage compensation programs exist.

=== Belgium and Netherlands ===
In Belgium and the Netherlands wolves were spotted in several locations in 2011. The different lone wolves came probably from the French or Italian populations. Since wildlife corridors and wildlife crossings over highways were created to connect wildlife areas in the Netherlands, such as the Veluwezoom National Park and the Oostvaardersplassen with the Klever Reichswald in Germany, nature conservation organisations expected wolves to migrate to the low countries in the near future. In 2018, a wolf was recorded in Flanders, Belgium for the first time in over a century. The wolf's radio collar showed that it had come from Germany through the Netherlands, and that it had covered 500 km in just 10 days. In 2022, there were an estimated 15 wolves in four wolf packs living in the Netherlands. As of 2022, Belgium was home to at least 9 wolves in two packs.

Population numbers estimate across time is given from Blanco and Sundseth (2023) in the table below:

Estimated number of wolves in Belgium and the Netherlands.
Country/Year	2013 - 2018	September 2023
Belgium	4 - 6	28
Netherlands	0	63

=== Luxembourg ===
In 2020, DNA analysis of sheep killed in Luxembourg confirmed presence of wolves in the country after over a century.

=== Switzerland ===
The first wolf returned to Switzerland in 1995. In 2012, the first pack was established in the canton of Grisons. By January 2023, the number of packs has grown to 18 Swiss and 5 cross-border packs. Swiss authorities gave permission to shoot 42 wolves between the years 2000 and 2022.

=== Liechtenstein ===
Liechtenstein has reported one wolf, possibly dispersing from Switzerland.

=== Norway ===
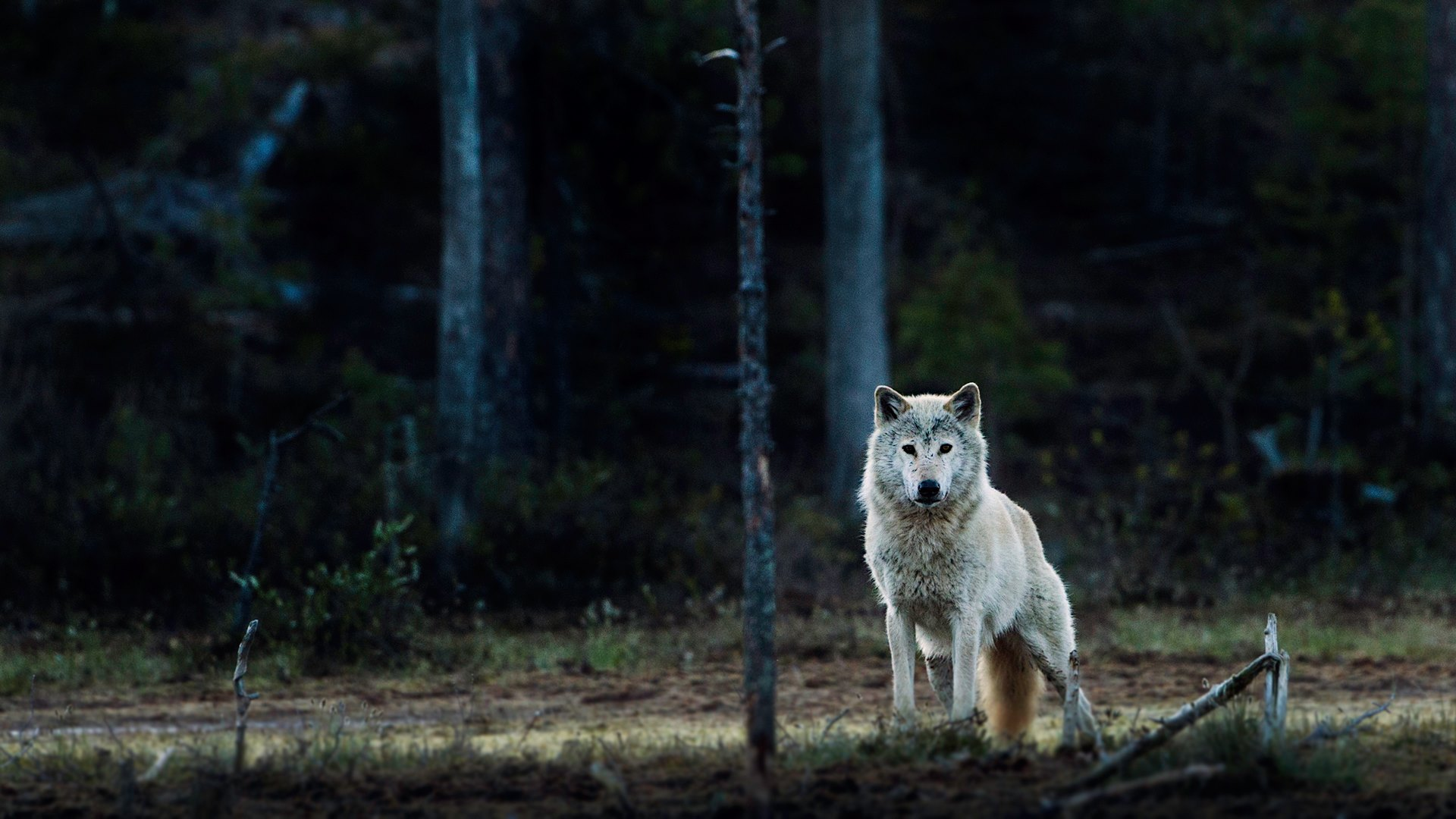
Eurasian wolf (Canis lupus lupus) in Norway

Norway's wolf population is located in the south-east, close to the Swedish border, and consists of around 100 wolves (roughly a third of which cross the border into Sweden).

According to an estimate made in the winter of 2022/2023, Norway was home to 9 wolf packs (6 of them being shared with Sweden) and 7 territorials pairs (3 of them being shared with Sweden).

Wolves are hunted in Norway and the Norwegian Parliament approved an amendment in June 2020 that further reduced protections for wolves.

=== Sweden ===
The Swedish Environmental Protection Agency estimated there were between 289 and 474 in Sweden in the winter of 2019–2020, which is an increase. Wolves are hunted in Sweden, with an aim to keep a sustainable population. The Swedish Environmental Protection Agency states that a minimum of 300 wolves is necessary in order to keep a genetic diversity that ensures long-term sustainability. A total of 24 wolves are planned to be killed by hunters during the winter of 2020–2021, in the regions of Värmland, Örebro, Västmanland and Gävleborg.

Estimates made during the winter of 2022/2023 recorded 49 packs in Sweden and Norway, with 40 packs solely in Sweden. The population of wolves in the country was estimated at 450 wolves for that winter.

=== Denmark ===
In Denmark the last wolf had been shot in 1813, but beginning in 2009 there was speculation that a wolf had crossed the border from Germany due to numerous observations. A wolf that had died from a cancerous tumor was found in 2012; it was the first confirmed in the country in 199 years. In 2013, three different lone wolves were observed in Denmark. According to local biologists, one pair had pups in 2013 based on sound recordings, but the first definite confirmation came in 2017 when an adult wolf with eight pups was filmed. The population has subsequently increased and by 2024 about 40 adult wolves were known in Denmark (all living in Jutland), including 8 pairs and at least 6 of them had pups that year. Wolves are fully protected and compensation is paid for livestock damage. It has been estimated that the carrying capacity is between 46 and 121 adults in Jutland, equal to a total winter/spring population (both adults and immatures born previous years) of 77 to 220. Unlike Jutland that is directly connected to the European continent, it would be difficult but not impossible for wolves to establish populations on the Danish islands; there is a single recent report from Funen of a wolf that presumably arrived on the island by swimming across the Little Belt. While the small Danish population originated from wolves that immigrated from Germany, DNA evidence has revealed that Danish-born wolves have also moved to Germany.

=== Finland ===
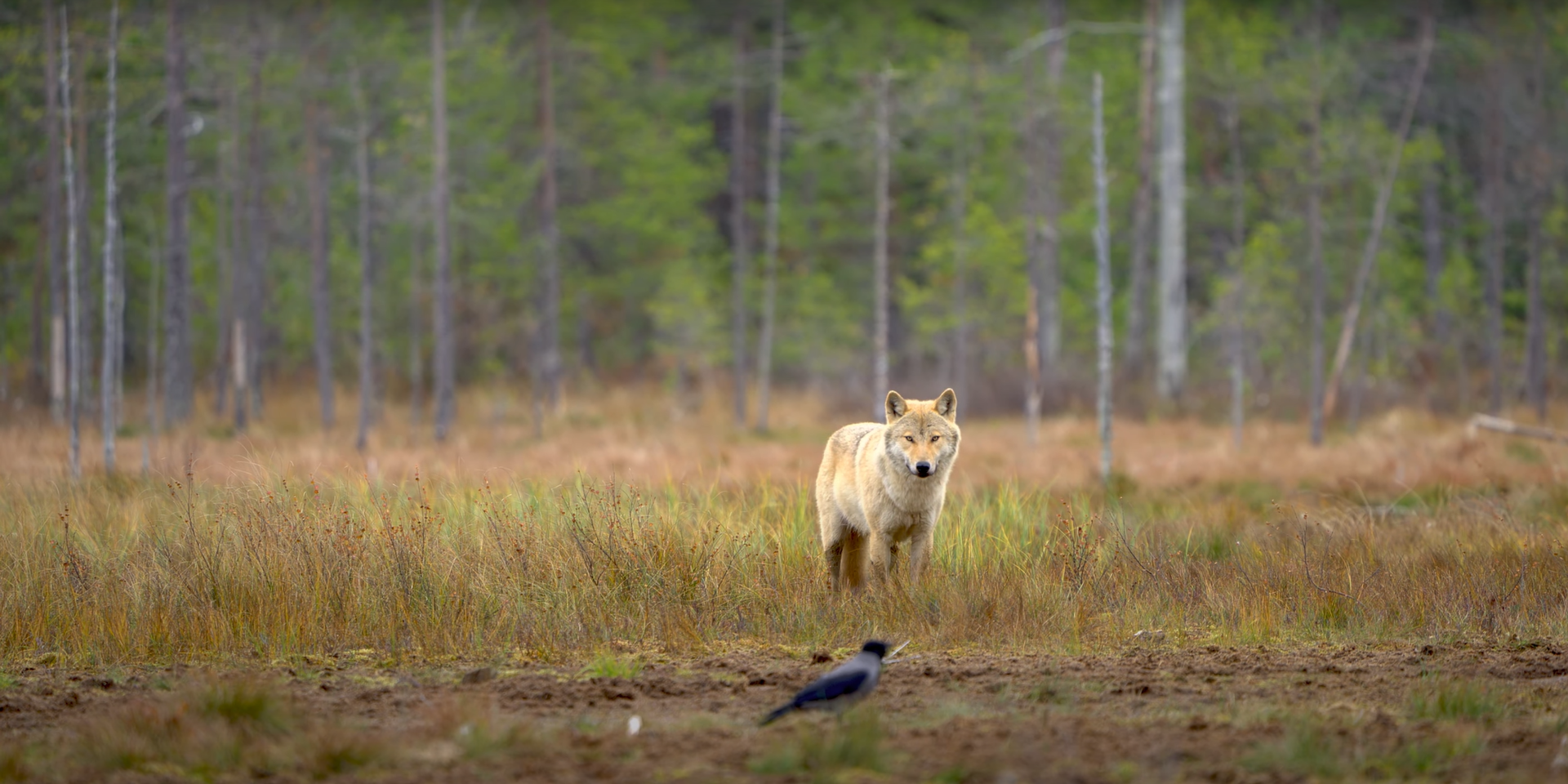
Eurasian wolf (Canis lupus lupus) on the swamp in Finland

Finland was estimated in 2020 by the National Resources Institute of Finland to contain 216-246 wolves in up to 30 packs. The population is connected to the large Russian wolf population.

Population numbers estimate across time is given in the table below:

Estimated number of wolves in Finland.
Species Population/Year	2013 - 2018	2020	March 2023
Grey Wolf	168 - 193	216 - 246	291 - 331

Wolves are legally hunted only in areas with high reindeer densities. Compensation for livestock losses are paid by the state and insurance companies.

=== Poland ===
As of 2021, Poland has a population of approximately 1,900 wolves and increasing.

Since 1995, they have been a protected species, and compensation is paid for livestock losses.

=== Estonia ===
Estonia has an increasing wolf population of around 300 wolves, down from around 500 in the middle of the 1990s. The official standpoint considers the optimal population to be 100–200. At rough scale the distribution range includes the whole country.

Population numbers estimate across time is given from Blanco and Sundseth (2023) in the table below:

Estimated number of wolves in Estonia.
Species population/Year	2013 - 2018	November 2022
Grey Wolf	180 - 260	300 - 330

In 2007, a new version of the law on nature conservation introduced compensation for livestock damage, paid by the state.

=== Latvia ===
Latvia has an unprotected population of 700 wolves, down from 900 in the middle of the 1990s. Wolf numbers are unstable, with drops and increases occurring frequently.

No compensation is paid for livestock damage.

=== Lithuania ===
Lithuania has a population of at least 500, which is increasing in number. In 2023, there was an estimate of 91 packs and 728 wolves in Lithuania.

The species is not protected, and only insured livestock receives compensation.

=== Belarus ===
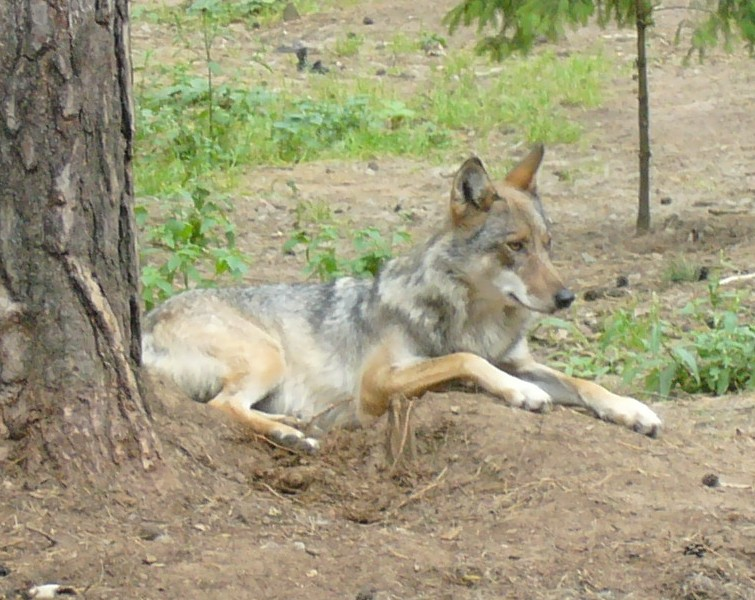
A wolf in Belarus

Belarus is home to a population of 1,500–2,000 wolves. With the exception of specimens in nature reserves, wolves in Belarus are largely unprotected. They are designated a game species, and bounties ranging between €60 and €70 are paid to hunters for each wolf killed. This is a considerable sum in a country where the average monthly wage is €230. No compensation is paid for livestock losses.

=== Ukraine ===
Ukraine has an unprotected, yet stable population of 2,000 wolves. In May 2007, the killing of pregnant females and pups was banned. No compensation is paid for livestock losses. Many of the wolves live in the Zone of alienation north of Chernobyl, where they face few natural threats. This applies equally to the Belarusian part of the zone.

=== Czechia ===
Czech Republic has an increasing and protected population of 100 wolves as of 2021 and was the home of an estimated 29 wolf packs in 2023.

Population numbers estimate across time is given in the table below:

Estimated number of wolves in Czechia.
Species population/Year	2013 - 2018	2021	March 2023
Gray Wolf	5 - 80	100	120 - 150

The livestock damage compensation programme is in place.

=== Slovakia ===
Slovakia has a stable population of around 500 wolves.

Population numbers estimate across time is given from Blanco and Sundseth (2023) in the table below:

Estimated number of wolves in Slovakia.
Species population/Year	2013 - 2018	2023
Gray Wolf	302 - 610	400 - 600

As of 1 June 2021 they are legally protected and can't be hunted.

Compensation is paid for livestock losses.

=== Slovenia ===
Slovenia has a stable population of approximately 120 wolves.

Population numbers estimate across time is given from Blanco and Sundseth (2023) in the table below:

Estimated number of wolves in Slovenia.
Species population/Year	2013 - 2018	2022/2023
Gray Wolf	72 - 78	116

Since 1991, they have been a protected species, and compensation is paid for livestock losses.

=== Croatia ===
Croatia has a stable population of around 200 wolves.

Since May 1995, they have been a protected species, and the deliberate killing of wolves can result in a fine equivalent to $6,000. However, according to Dr. Đuro Huber of the University of Zagreb, illegal wolf killings increased after the protection scheme began, resulting in the deaths of 40 wolves.

Compensation is paid for livestock losses.

=== Bosnia and Herzegovina ===
Bosnia and Herzegovina is thought to have a population of 400 wolves, though they are decreasing in number and are afforded no legal protection. Compensation for livestock losses is not paid.

=== Serbia and Montenegro ===
The former State Union of Serbia and Montenegro has a stable population of 500 wolves, though it is unknown if they are afforded any protection and no compensation is paid for livestock damage.

=== Hungary ===
Hungary has a stable population of 50-100 wolves, which are protected, though with some exceptions.

No compensation is paid for livestock damage.

=== Romania ===
Romania has an increasing population of 2,500 - 3,000 wolves, which are granted legal protection.

No compensation is paid for livestock damage.

=== Bulgaria ===
Bulgaria has an increasing population of wolves.

Population numbers estimate across time is given from Blanco and Sundseth (2023) in the table below:

Estimated number of wolves in Bulgaria.
Species population/Year	2013 - 2018	2021
Gray Wolf	800 - 1,200	2,712

Wolves in Bulgaria are granted no legal protection.

Wolves are considered a nuisance and have an active bounty on them. No compensation is paid for livestock damage.

=== Greece ===
Greece has a population of approximately 1,020 wolves, which are legally protected. They are located in the northern and central mainland regions (Epirus, Macedonia, Thrace, Thessaly), though in 2024 they reappeared in the Peloponnese after a 90 year absence.

Compensation is paid for livestock losses, with over 80% of it from insurance.

=== North Macedonia ===
North Macedonia has an increasing, yet unprotected population of 1,000 wolves, with no livestock compensation programmed.

=== Albania ===
Albania has a protected population of 250 wolves, which are increasing in number, though no compensation is paid for livestock losses.

=== Russia ===
Russian wolves have no legal protection and, according to official estimates, number about 67,000 (as of 2021), yet the actual number is suspected to be much higher. The population has been increasing since the late 1980s, when their number was estimated at 4,500. Some villages in Chechnya's Nadterechny district have been reporting increasing wolf numbers since the decrease of military activities. On the other hand, in more populated regions of Central and Southern Russia the number of wolves is very small. In some regions, bounties are paid for the destruction of wolves and dens. Wolves live in comparatively few numbers in the Sikhote-Alin region due to competition with a growing Siberian tiger population. This competitive exclusion of wolves by tigers has been used by Russian conservationists to convince hunters in the Far East to tolerate the big cats, as they are less harmful to livestock, and are effective in controlling the latter's numbers. No livestock damage compensation is paid.

== Asia ==
=== Armenia ===
In 2014, Armenia was estimated to have a stable population of between 600 and 900 wolves.

=== Bangladesh ===
In Bangladesh, an Indian wolf appeared after no sightings for 70 years and 450 km eastwards from the nearest population. Another wolf was sighted in 2017 in the same region but on the Indian side of the border. Vast tidal estuaries exist in this area that have not been surveyed for wildlife.

=== China ===
China's wolf population largely lives in areas where little human-influenced change has occurred - the Qinghai–Tibet Plateau, the Mongolia Plateau, and the northeast Plain. In 2003, an estimated 12,500 wolves were living in China. In 2015, wolves were listed as a vulnerable species in the Red List of China's Vertebrates, with all hunting being banned for this legally protected animal.

In the Qinghai Lake Region of China (Northeastern Tibet), wolf density was estimated at 0.14 +- 0.04 wolves by square kilometers in 1998, where the hunting of the wolf was stopped in 1994.

=== The Sinai Peninsula (Egypt) ===
Egypt's Sinai Peninsula has a confirmed, but rare, presence of Arabian wolves around St. Katherine, Sheikh Awad, and the Blue Desert, although there are no accurate population estimates available.

=== Georgia ===
There are few population estimates of Georgia's wolves, but research on human-wolf conflict have suggested that the population is increasing.

=== India ===
India has a population of approximately 2,000 to 3,000 Indian wolves (Canis lupus pallipes) in addition to their population of Tibetan wolves (Canis lupus chanco).

According to the study of Jhala et al. (2022), India could potentially be the home of about 3,170 adults (2,568 - 3,847) wolves, in a potential 423 to 540 packs. The study also regarded population estimates across many states of India, and the states of Madhya Pradesh, Rajasthan, Gujarat, Maharashtra and Chhattisgarh all had wolf populations estimates surpassing 300 individuals, with Madhya Pradesh inhabiting the most wolves at a mean estimate of 772. The states of Andhra Pradesh, Telangana, Odisha, Jharkhand, Karnataka, Uttar Pradesh and Bihar also had a population estimate done, ranging from means of 165 to 33 wolves. Aswell, the states of Tamil Nadu, Uttarakhand, West Bengal and Haryana had casual visiting wolves.

Wolves in India are legally protected. Populations are decreasing due to hunting from farmers. No livestock damage compensation is paid.

=== Iran ===
Iran has a population of 1,500 wolves. As of 2015, the government pays for livestock killed by wolves. There is also a $3,000 fine for hunting wolves.

=== Iraq ===
Iraq has a stable population of around 115 wolves; no livestock compensation is paid.

=== Israel ===
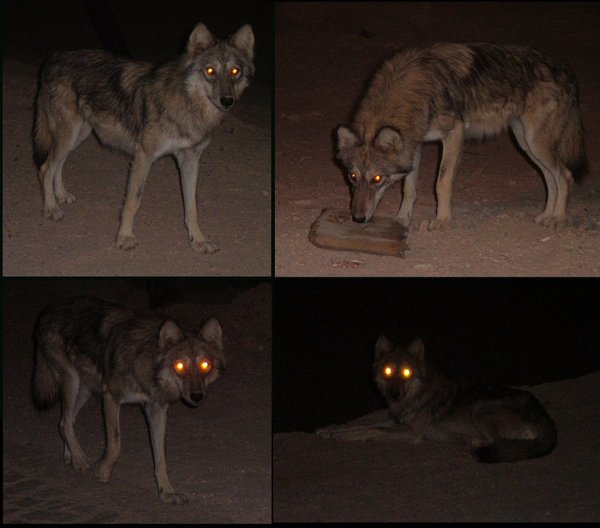
Arabian wolf (Canis lupus arabs) in Southern Israel

Israel has a stable population of approximately 180 - 250 wolves: at least 80 - 100 Indian wolves in the north (Carmel, Galilee, and Golan Heights), and 100-150 Arabian wolves in the south (Negev Highlands, Arava Valley, and Eilat Mountains).

Some livestock damage compensation is paid.

Israel's wolves are legally protected under the 1955 Wildlife Protection Law.

=== Jordan ===
Jordan has an unprotected, unknown number of wolves, thought to be roughly numbering 200. The population is decreasing due to hunting. No livestock damage compensation is paid.

=== Kazakhstan ===
Kazakhstan had a stable population of about 30,000 wolves in the 2000s. Lider et al. (2020) estimated the population of wolves in the country in 2018 as 13,200 animals.

About 2,000 are killed yearly for a $40 bounty, though the animal's numbers have risen sharply.

No livestock damage compensation is paid.

=== Kyrgyzstan ===
Kyrgyzstan has a stable population of about 4,000 wolves, which are unprotected.

Wolves are treated as a nuisance in the country, where killing of animals are rewarded financially. In 2010, some 157 wolves were killed.

No livestock damage compensation is paid.

=== Lebanon ===
Lebanon has a population of about 50 wolves. Wolves are afforded no legal protection, nor is livestock damage compensation paid.

=== Mongolia ===
Mongolia has a stable population of 10,000–20,000 wolves.

The wolf population in Mongolia suffered quite intensive hunting periods in the early years of the 20th century, with up to 18,000 wolves being killed each year in the 1930s and 1940s, under the big and wide-range wolf hunts fostered and planned by the government. These massive "controls" rapidly impacted the wolf population and the yearly bag count. It stabilized at around 4 000 wolves taken by year in the 1950 - 1975 and 1980 - 1985 periods. Recrudescence of wolf bagging numbers happened as a nationwide survey, including markets, made in the summer of 2004 left assuming that 20,000 to 30,000 wolves could be taken by hunters each year. Kaczensky et al. (2008) expressed their concern with these numbers, noting that such high takes could not be supported by the wolf population, and that it assumedly resulted in the local extinction of many wolves populations of some steppe areas. Furthermore, it was also noted that not knowing the size of the country wolf population, the impact of these hunts could not be assessed on a conservation basis.

Wolves are partially protected in strictly protected areas (SPA's) under the Mongolian law on protected areas which prohibits the act of hunting and carrying firearms in SPAs. Therefore, some wolves populations like in the Great Gobi B SPA, the Bogdkhan Mountain Strictly Protected Area, and others benefits from some protection.

In Hustai National Park, legally protected since 1994, activities such as hunting, logging and letting livestock graze in the park were banned. A study published in 2009 by van Duyne et al., estimated the wolf population of this park at 20 - 50.

Wolves are given no legal protection, and no livestock damage compensation is paid.

=== Nepal ===
Nepal had at least 40 instances of wolf presence in the 2010s, with evidence that they are recovering.

A number of 30 to 50 wolves were estimated to inhabit Nepal in the late 2000s, on the northern part of the country.

=== Pakistan ===
Pakistan has an estimated population of at least 365-415 Tibetan gray wolves (Canis lupus chanco): 350 - 400 across Gilgit-Baltistan, and at least 15 in South Waziristan.

A study conducted in 2008 and 2009 in Lehri Nature Park, in the district of Jhelum, suggested that the park was home to an estimated 6 Indian wolves (Canis lupus pallipes).

=== Palestine ===
The Palestinian Territories have an unknown number of Arabian and Indian wolves, but their presence is confirmed in the West Bank and Gaza. As of 2022, population surveys were ongoing.

=== Saudi Arabia ===
Saudi Arabia has a stable population of 250 to 700 wolves, which are given no legal protection. No livestock damage compensation is paid.

=== Syria ===
Syria has an unprotected, unknown number of wolves, thought to be roughly numbering 200. No livestock damage compensation is paid.

=== Tajikistan ===
Tajikistan has a population of 1,700 wolves in 2016, which are stable and unprotected. However some data reports suggest they have a population estimate of 5,300 wolves present in 2019 according to Tajikistan's Agency of Statistics.

=== Turkey ===
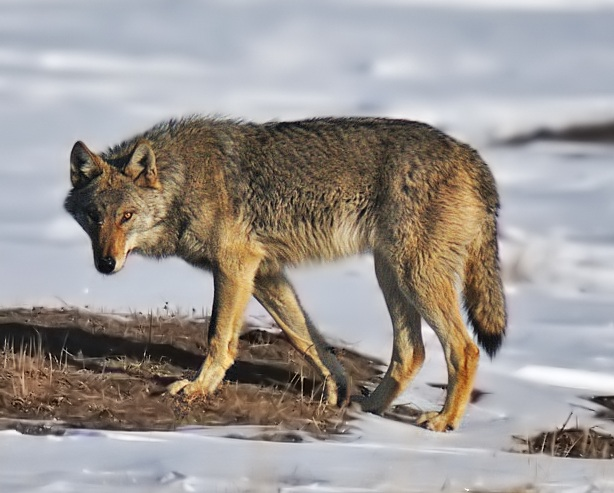
Steppe wolf (Canis lupus campestris) in Turkey

Turkey has a population of about 7,000. The wolf can be found in central, northern, and eastern Anatolia away from coastal areas and at altitudes above 900 metres. It has recently begun to re-establish itself in western Anatolia.

=== Turkmenistan ===
Turkmenistan has a stable population of 1,000 wolves, which are unprotected. No livestock damage compensation is paid.

=== Uzbekistan ===
Uzbekistan has a stable population of 2,000 wolves, which are unprotected. No livestock damage compensation is paid.

=== Afghanistan and Bhutan ===
There are currently no recent or reliable estimates on wolf populations in Afghanistan or Bhutan.

== North America ==
=== Canada ===
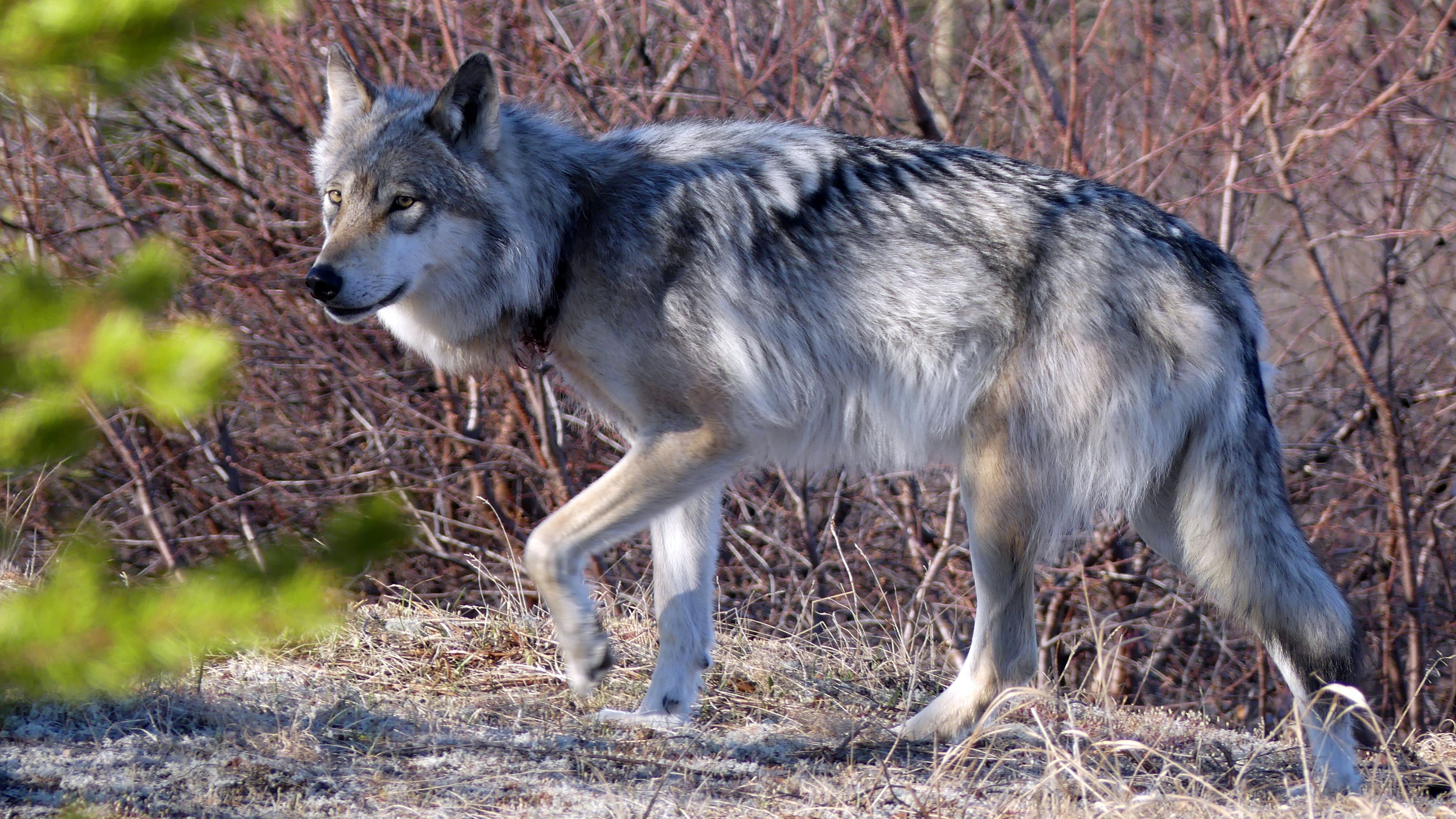
Labrador wolf (Canis lupus labradorius) in Baie-James, Canada

Canada has over 60,000 wolves, which are legally considered a big game species, though they are afforded protection in 3% of Canada's territory. The Northwest Territories, Nunavut and Yukon have 5,000 wolves each, British Columbia has 8,500 wolves, Alberta 7,000, Saskatchewan 4,300, Manitoba 4,000-6,000, Ontario 9,000, Quebec 7,000 and Labrador 2,000. In the fall of 2012, the government of British Columbia was considering a cull of the wolf population in some areas. In the winter of 2015 the government of British Columbia began undertaking a cull of up to 184 wolves in an effort to combat dwindling caribou populations in the South Selkirk Mountains and the South Peace region. The cull, like ones before it, was opposed by certain environmental groups.

On 12 March 2012, a Labrador wolf, mistakenly thought to be a coyote, was shot in Newfoundland. It was the first confirmed Labrador wolf in Newfoundland since c. 1930.

=== Greenland ===
In 2018, it was estimated that the total population of Greenland wolves was about 200, but with significant uncertainty due to their very remote Arctic range in the north and northeast (wolves are not known to have permanently inhabited the southern or southwestern regions where almost all the island's people live, though wolves have been documented in western Greenland around Uummannaq and Disko Bay over the last 200 years). As of 2021, north Greenland is estimated to have a total population of 32 wolves during optimal years. The Greenland population is connected via regular sea ice to the population on Canada's Ellesmere Island. After having contracted in the first part of the 1900s, the range of wolves in Greenland historically rebounded and covered an area roughly similar to the area originally inhabited. However, the range has contracted again since the beginning of the 2000s. Wolves had been fully protected in Greenland from 1988 to 2020. Under updated regulations implemented in 2020, wolves remain generally protected in Greenland but licensed hunters in Qaanaaq and Ittoqqortoormiit are permitted to hunt them under a government-set quota system.

=== United States of America ===
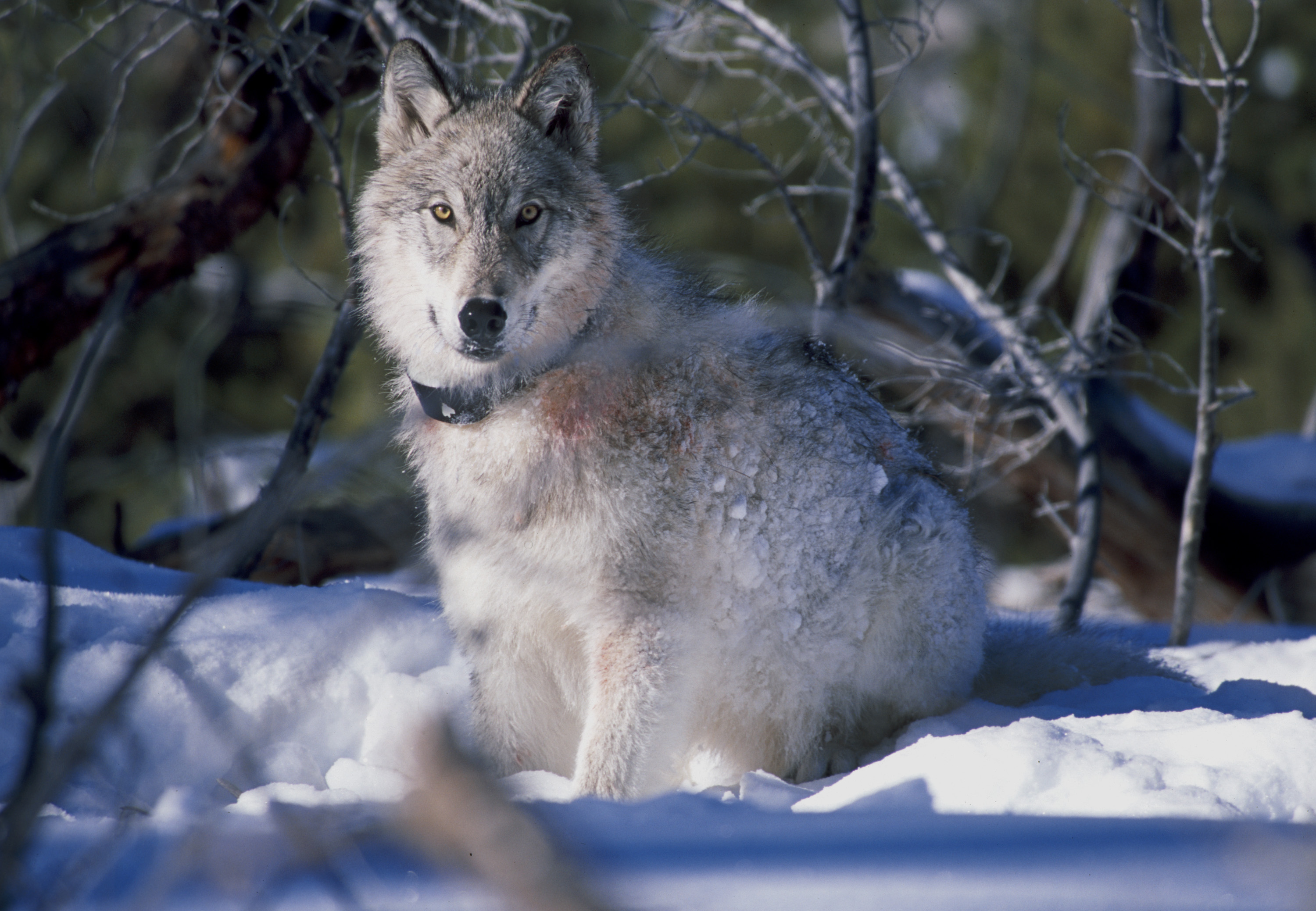
A radio collared Northwestern wolf (Canis lupus occidentalis) in Yellowstone National Park, Wyoming

As of 2017, the United States has up to 18,000 wolves, about two thirds of which are in Alaska. They are increasing in number in all their ranges. Usually, however, wolves in the United States are mostly seen during the winter months in northern Minnesota, northern Wisconsin, Michigan's Upper Peninsula, and portions of Washington, Idaho, northern Oregon, northwest Wyoming, California, and Montana, as the majority of wolf populations migrate from Canada to the Northwestern states and some of the Midwestern and Great Lakes States during the winter months for the competition over eating bison, elk, white-tailed deer and other large ungulates, disputed between other carnivores such as grizzly bear, cougar, and coyote. Wolf recovery has been so successful that the United States Fish & Wildlife Service removed the western gray wolf from the federal endangered species list on 28 March 2008. Due to the controversy over wolf shootings, a coalition of environmental groups sued the federal government to put the gray wolf back on the Endangered Species list.

On 18 July 2008, a federal judge ruled in favor of renewed endangered species protection.

On January 14, 2009, the United States Department of the Interior removed the gray wolf from the Endangered Species List in every American state except Wyoming. This move was blocked by lawsuits filed by conservation groups, but was successfully delisted on 15 April 2011, by the US Congress as part of a budget bill. On 31 August 2012, Governor Matt Mead of Wyoming announced that wolves were no longer on the endangered species list in the state of Wyoming; therefore, they no longer need special protections from the US Fish and Wildlife Service. The wolf population in Wyoming was then controlled by the state. But on 23 September 2014, wolves in Wyoming were again listed as nonessential experimental population under the Endangered Species Act.

As of 2014, the Northwestern United States, with the exception of Alaska, has an estimated population of 1,802 wolves.

On 29 October 2020, it was announced that the gray wolf would be delisted from the Endangered Species Act. Wildlife advocates worried that this action will jeopardize the recovery of the species throughout the United States. President Joe Biden said he would review the decision by President Donald Trump. Noting that the delisting had been in the works for many years, the Biden administration supported the removal of protections.

==== Alaska ====
Alaska has a stable population of 10,500-12,000 wolves, which are legally hunted from August to April (in deer-rich areas) as a big game species.

==== Minnesota ====
As of the winter of 2021-2022 Minnesota was estimated to have a population of approximately 2691 wolves. They are legally protected, though they are occasionally culled for depredation control. Minnesota used to have control over its wolf population, but this was revoked by a federal appellate court on 1 August 2017, making wolf management the charge of the federal government. The court decided to retain the state's minimum population of 1,600 animals. It has been argued by state officials that management should remain in the hands of the state, allowing for the wolf to be removed from protected status, since the population has exceeded recovery goals for more than 25 years.

==== Wisconsin and Michigan ====
In 2023, Wisconsin had an estimated 1007 wolves. "During the winter of 2020, a minimum estimate of 695 (+75) wolves lived in the" Upper Peninsula of Michigan. On 19 December 2014, all wolves in states of Michigan, Wisconsin, and Minnesota became protected again under the U.S. Endangered Species Act.

==== Wyoming, Idaho and Montana ====
The Northern Rocky Mountain states (Wyoming, Idaho and Montana) have an approximate population of 1,657 wolves in 282 packs (including 85 breeding pairs). In 1995 and 1996, wolves were reintroduced to Yellowstone National Park and in Idaho.

==== Washington ====
Two gray wolves were captured in north-central Washington state in July 2008, one of which was a nursing female. This was the first evidence of reproducing wolves in the state since the 1930s. As of the end of 2022, Washington has at least 216 wolves in 37 packs with 5 breeding pairs.

==== Oregon ====
In northeast Oregon, also in July 2008, wolf howls were heard by biologists who identified at least two adults and two pups. This was the first confirmed breeding pair in Oregon. By December 2011, Oregon's gray wolf population had grown to 24. One of the Oregon gray wolves, known as OR-7, traveled more than 700 miles (1,100 km) to the Klamath Basin and crossed the border into California.. |quote=OR-7, the gray wolf that wandered all the way to southern Oregon after dispersing from the Imnaha pack several months ago, has crossed the California border. [...] Based on the GPS data, he is now more than 300 miles from where his journey began. His journey, in total, has been more than twice that far with many changes in direction. [...] There are now at least 24 wolves in Oregon in four reproducing packs. [...]}} The newspaper published a somewhat abridged rerun of this article on 4 January 2012 (posted online 3 January 2012; NewsBank 14FD3A7030E015C0, 13C132A6CF2DD570), which has all of the sentences quoted above, except for the one about the number of wolves in Oregon.</ref> Wolf OR-7 became the first wolf west of the Cascades in Oregon since the last bounty was claimed in 1947. Oregon's wolf population increased to 77 wolves in 15 packs with 8 breeding pairs as of the end of 2015. As a result, Oregon Department of Fish and Wildlife proposed to delist wolves from their protected species list. As of 2022, Oregon had 178 wolves in 24 packs.

==== California ====
In 2011, Wolf OR-7 became the first wolf to return to California. As of 2024, the state has at least four breeding packs: the Lassen Pack, Beckwourth Pack, the Whaleback Pack, and the Yowlumni Pack. A fifth pack, the Shasta Pack, was last detected in 2015.

==== Colorado ====
Wolves from the Greater Yellowstone Ecosystem have dispersed into Colorado several times in the 21st century. In 2021, scientists documented the first litter of pups born to wolves in the state since the wolves' original extirpation. This resident wolf pack is monitored by Colorado Parks & Wildlife. As part of the 2020 elections, voters in Colorado narrowly voted to deliberately reintroduce wolves to the state. In December 2023, 10 wolves were released onto public land in the Western Slope, in Summit and Grand Counties. They were translocated from Oregon. The group consisted of two adult males, two juvenile males, and six juvenile females.

==== Arizona and New Mexico ====
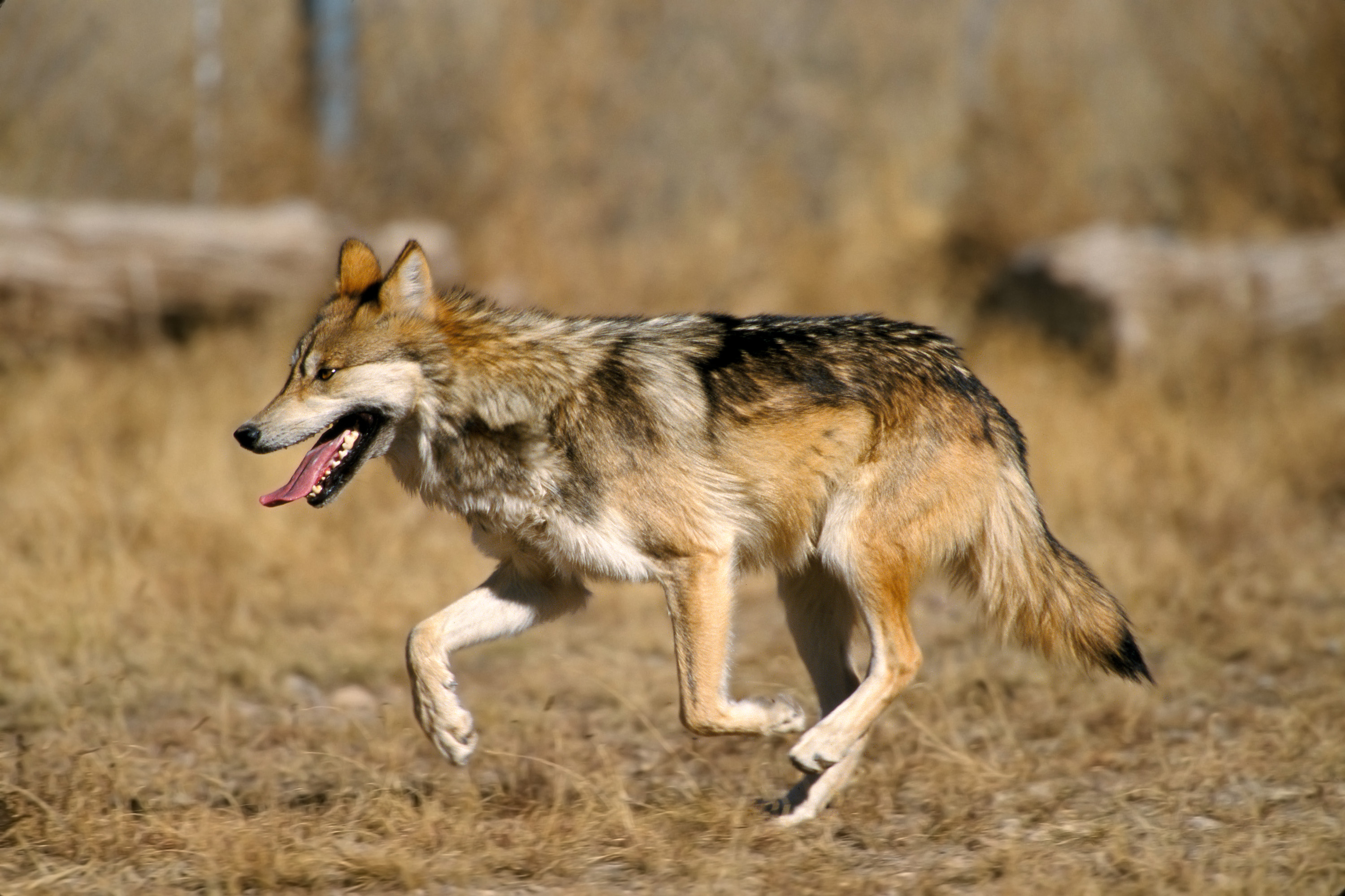
Captive Mexican wolf (Canis lupus baileyi) at Sevilleta National Wildlife Refuge, New Mexico

The wolf was extirpated from Mexico in the 1970s, when the U.S. and Mexican governments cooperated to capture all remaining wild Mexican wolves and initiate a captive-breeding program in an attempt to save the local subspecies. The Mexican Wolf was reintroduced into the Apache-Sitgreaves National Forest in Arizona in 1998 as part of a captive breeding program. There were at least 42 wild Mexican wolves in the southwest United States in 2008. In 2014, there were around 83 Mexican wolves in the wild. In 2021, there were an estimated 196 wolves in the wild, distributed across western New Mexico and eastern Arizona. As of March 2026, there were at least 319 Mexican wolves across New Mexico and Arizona, representing 10 years of continued population growth.

On 27 October 2014, a collared wolf-like canid was seen in north of Grand Canyon, and in November 2014, the same animal was videoed.: "Exclusive: Tourists video Grand Canyon wolf". YouTube. 25 November 2014.</ref> It was later confirmed to be a northwestern wolf from the Northern Rocky Mountains on 21 November 2014. On 28 December 2014, it was shot dead in southwestern Utah near the Arizona border.

==== Other states (vagrant wolves) ====
Occasionally, wolves from Canada disperse into upstate New York. This has been officially confirmed three times in the 21st century. The most recent wolf found in New York was killed by a hunter who mistook it for a coyote during the latter's hunting season in 2021.

=== Mexico ===
The wolf was extirpated from Mexico in the 1970s, when the U.S. and Mexican governments cooperated to capture all remaining wild Mexican wolves and initiate a captive-breeding program in an attempt to save the local subspecies.

On 9 March 2022, two new breeding pairs of Mexican gray wolves were released into the wild in the state of Chihuahua in northern Mexico, bringing the total number of Mexican gray wolves in the country to around 45 wild individuals. In 2026, eight wolves were released into Durango.

== See also ==
- Mexican wolf
- Wolves in the British Isles
- Subspecies of Canis lupus
- List of wolves

== Bibliography ==
Carmine Esposito (2007). "Il Lupo" Roma- Franco Muzzio Editore. Franco Muzzio Editore. p. 127. ISBN 978-88-7413-143-3.
