= École nationale d'ingénieurs de Saint-Étienne =

Engineering college in Saint-Etienne, France

Coordinates: 45°25′48″N 4°25′18″E

École nationale d'ingénieurs de Saint-Étienne (ÉNISE)
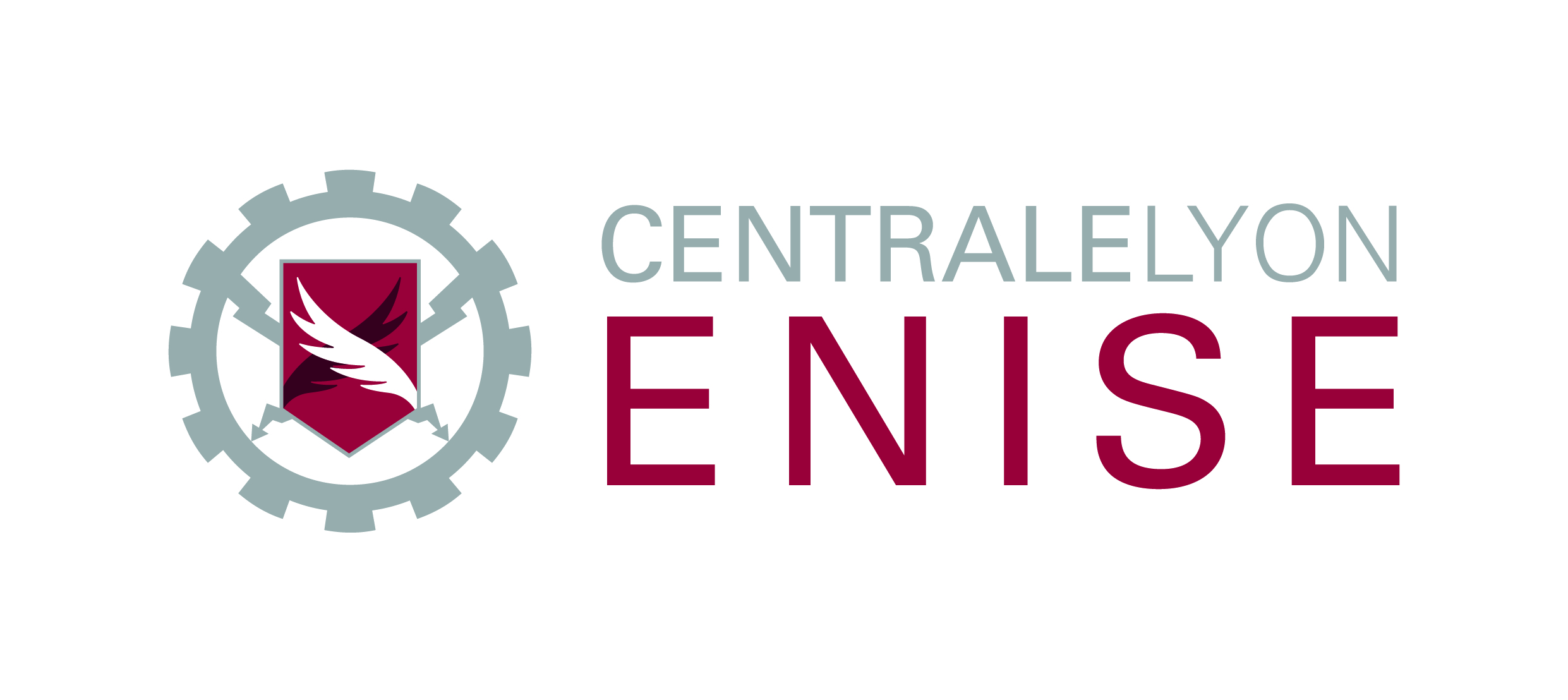
- Type: Public
- Established: 1961
- Affiliations: Groupe ENI; University of Lyon; Conférence des grandes écoles; Conférence des directeurs des écoles françaises d'ingénieurs (CDEFI)
- Director: Roland Fortunier
- Administrative staff: approx. 160
- Students: approx. 920
- Undergraduates: approx. 890
- Postgraduates: approx. 30
- Location: Saint-Etienne, France
- Campus: Urban
- Colours: Red white
- Website: http://www.enise.fr/

The École nationale d'ingénieurs de Saint-Étienne (French pronunciation: [ekɔl nɑsjɔnal dɛ̃ʒenjœʁ də sɛ̃t‿etjɛn]; transl. "National Engineering School of Saint-Étienne"; abbr. ENISE) is a French grande école which offers five-year course in engineering after the baccalauréat, in the fields of Mechanical Engineering, Civil Engineering and Sensory Engineering.

The school delivers the Diplôme d'Ingénieur in Mechanical Engineering and in Civil Engineering.

ÉNISE is part of the "Groupe des Ecoles Nationales d'Ingénieurs", Groupe ENI - French for the Group of National Engineering Schools, which is a network of 4 French public engineering schools.

It is also part of the University of Lyon, a state-run Higher Education & Research (HE & R) consortium - a federation of 18 Higher Education Institutes (HEIs) that federate their doctoral schools under one doctoral college representing a total of 120 000 students, 11 500 research lecturers and 230 public laboratories.

== Introduction ==
=== History ===
ÉNISE was established in 1961 with the Mechanical Engineering major. The Civil Engineering major was introduced in 1971. At that time it was a 4-year program but since 1987 students follow a 5-year program. This is due to additional work placement in the third fourth and fifth year.

Key events :

- 1961 - ÉNISE is founded. Accreditation is obtained for the Mechanical Engineering programme
- 1971 - Accreditation is obtained for the Civil Engineering programme
- 1987 - The duration for the engineering courses is extended to 5 years after the Baccalauréat
- 2002 - The Master in Dual Design course is introduced
- 2009 - ÉNISE becomes an "Établissement public à caractère scientifique, culturel et professionnel"
- 2009 - The Civil Engineering course is opened with an "alternance" option, where the course structure is modified to alternate academic learning and industrial training during the final year
- 2010 - The Mechanical Engineering course is opened with an "alternance" option
- 2011 - The 50th class of engineers graduate from ÉNISE

=== Campus ===
The ÉNISE campus has two locations in Saint-Étienne:

- The main building is based in the South of Saint Etienne on one of the hills surrounding the city. Here there are many classrooms, one lecture theatre, 7 computer rooms, civil engineering laboratories, mechanical engineering laboratories, boiler works, language laboratories and conference rooms. It also has extensive grounds for Civil Engineering field assignments.
- The Pôle Productique, located in the north of St Etienne, is the mechanical engineering and research centre.

== Academic organisation ==
=== Teaching ===
The academic year is made up of two semesters. Each year is worth 60 ECTS credits. Within these 60 credits there are a number of compulsory subjects which are complemented by optional units.

Instruction is only given through seminars and practicals, while students are assessed through either an end of module exam or coursework.
Students have to pass the TOEIC with a score of 785 or above.

=== Work Placement/Internships ===
The engineering courses at ÉNISE allow students to gain industry exposure through compulsory industrial training periods. Each student is required to complete a semester-long internship in the 3rd, 4th and 5th year.

Almost 50% of students undergo at least a 6-month internship in a foreign country. 10% of students also complete their final year at the University of Portsmouth, Mendoza Regional Faculty or University of Siegen and are awarded with a double diploma from both ÉNISE and the partner university.

== Research ==
=== Diagnostics and Imaging of Industrial Processes (DIPI) ===
This laboratory has three main research objectives:

Development of the scientific and technological basis for manufacturing engineered functional objects and surfaces by technologies based on concentrated energy fluxes (lasers, plasma, thermal jets, etc.)

General Technical Objective : Development, optimisation and control of laser-, plasma- and thermal spray technologies. Application of optical monitoring, imaging and sensor engineering for on-line control of industrial high-temperature processes.

General Scientific Objective : Complex and comprehensive experimental study and numerical simulation of the phenomena occurring in application of concentrated energy flux for material processing: conjugated heat- and mass transfer under high temperature, phase transition, gas dynamics and radfition transfer.

They also work in collaboration with other European and South American companies through partnerships.

=== Laboratory of tribology and system dynamics (LTDS) ===
The LTDS carries out research in the following domains:
Tribology : science of friction, lubrication, wear and adhesion.
System dynamics: science of vibrations, system and mechanical devices stability.
Mechanics of heterogeneous solid media: calculations of structure, elements and transformation processes.
