= Forêts National Park =

French national park in Haute-Marne and Côte-d'Or

- Parc national de forêts
- IUCN category II (national park)
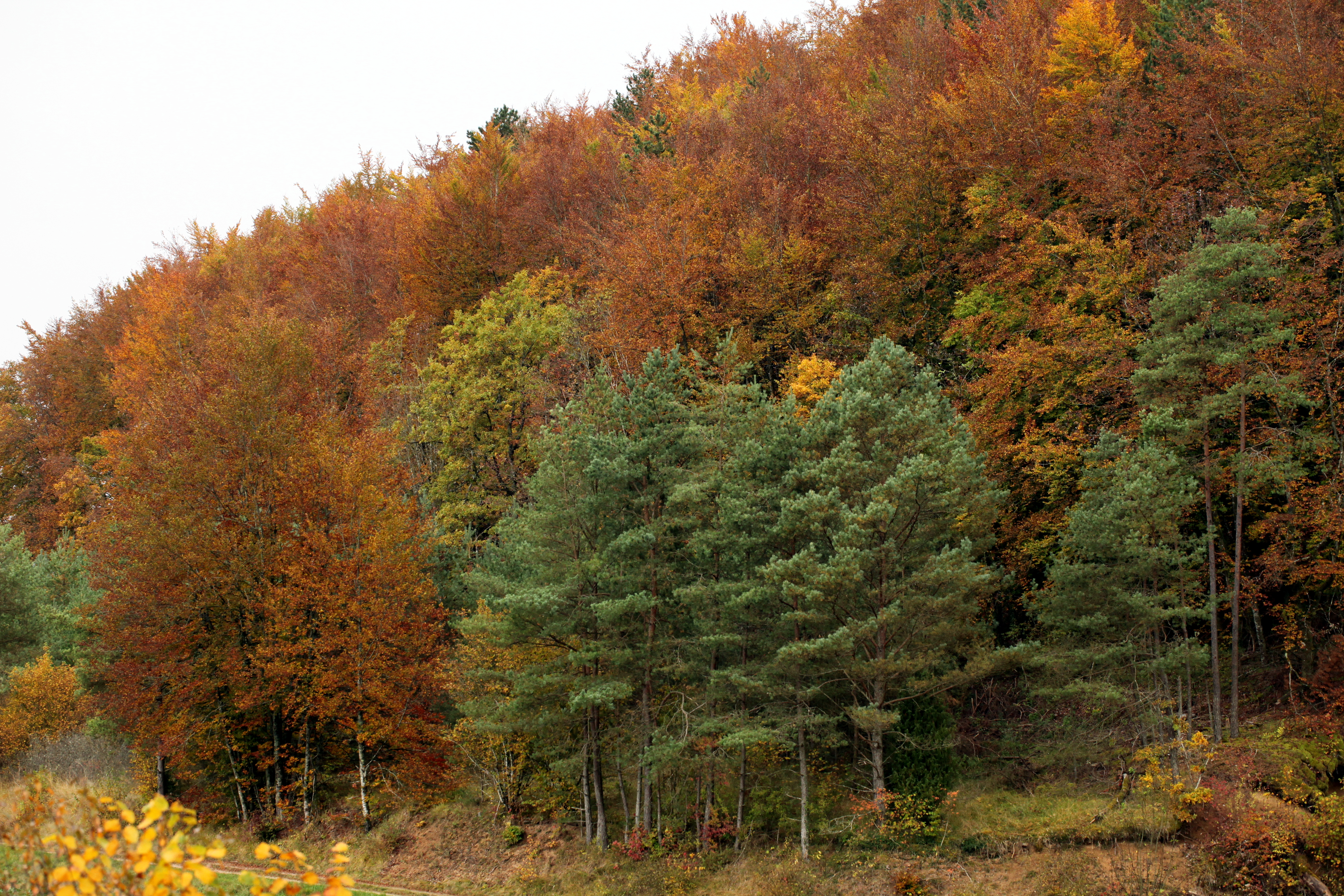
- Interactive map of Forêts National Park
- Location: Haute-Marne and Côte-d'Or, France
- Nearest city: Châtillon-sur-Seine
- Coordinates: 47.89°N 4.83°E
- Area: 560 km^{2} (216 sq mi)
- Established: 6 November 2019
- Governing body: Parcs nationaux de France
- Website: Parc national de forêts (French)

Forêts National Park (French: Parc national de forêts) is a French national park located in the northeastern part of metropolitan France, not far from Dijon to the south. It protects the broad-leaved trees typical of the southeastern Paris Basin plateau.

== History ==
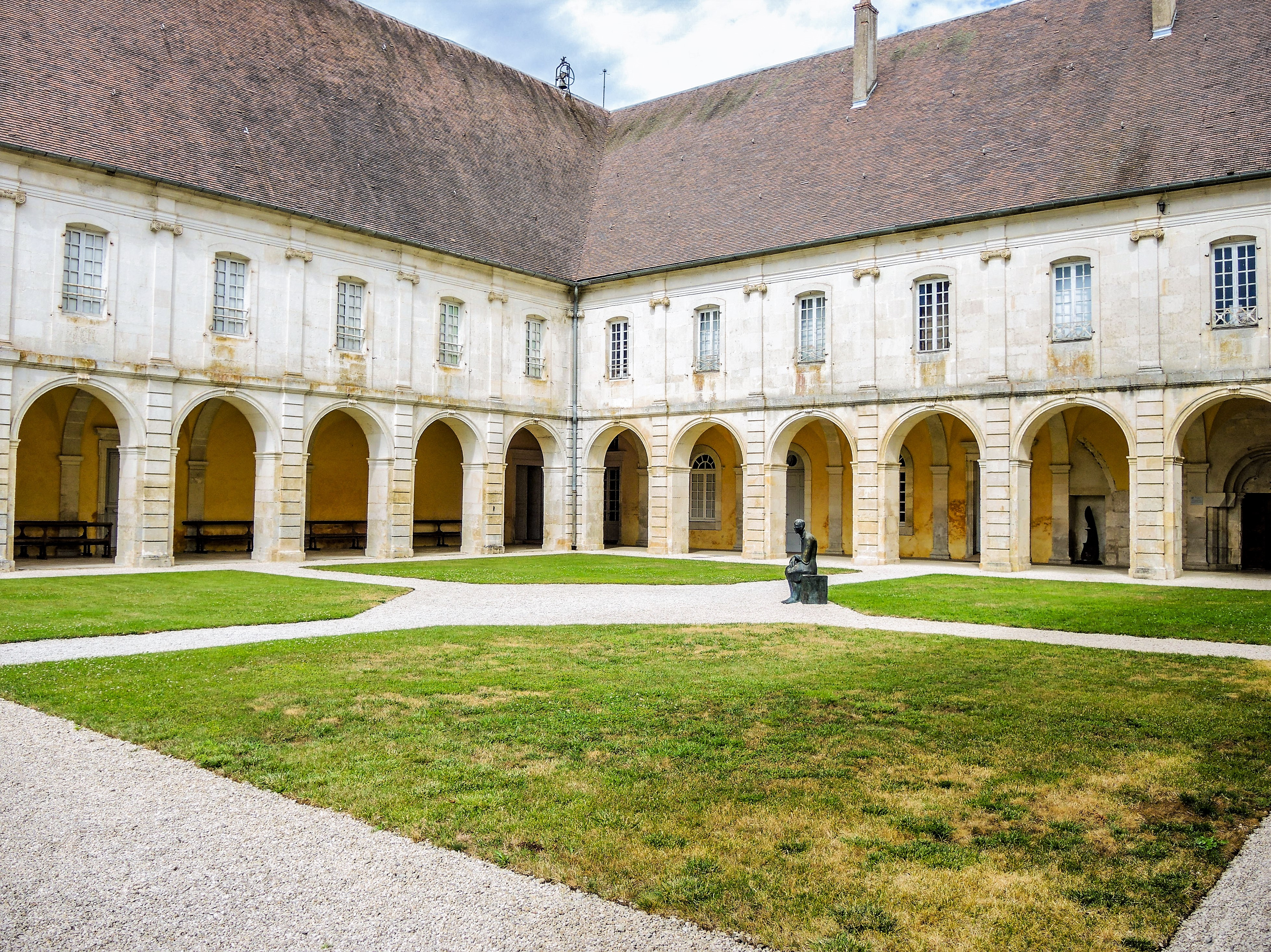
Auberive Abbey, located within Forêts National Park

The idea for the park was put forth in 2009, with numerous working groups and studies involved in over a decade in identifying strengths and weaknesses for what it could accomplish, as well as otherwise developing and defining its boundaries so that it would be a coherent, sensible whole.

The park was formally established on 7 November 2019, by publication of an official decree signed by Prime Minister Édouard Philippe in the Journal Officiel de la République Française. It is the eleventh national park of France to be created and the second largest behind the Guiana Amazonian Park in French Guiana.

== Geography ==
Forêts National Park is 560 square kilometres (220 sq mi) in area; it spans the border between the departments of Haute-Marne in Grand Est and Côte-d'Or in Bourgogne-Franche-Comté, covering 59 communes partly or totally. It is the sole national park in both Grand Est and Bourgogne-Franche-Comté.
