= Denis Chevrier =

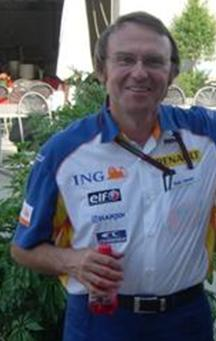
- Denis Chevrier in 2007.
- Born: 8 June 1954 (age 71)

Denis Chevrier (born 8 June 1954) is a retired Formula One engineer who was the head of engine operations for the Renault F1 team from 2002 to 2007.

== Career ==
Chevrier graduated with a degree in mechanical design and production. After joining the national engineering school in Metz, the Frenchman began his career as a motorcycle technician in classes up to 125 cm³ and 250 cm³.

As a motorsport enthusiast, however, he always remained open to other disciplines. At Renault-Sport, he worked from 1984 as a racing engineer for the Tyrrell Formula 1 team. Chevrier experimented with the possible uses of racing engines. After a year-long excursion into Renault's World Rally Championship project, he concentrated again on Formula 1. In his ten years at Williams F1, he won four world titles with four different drivers: Nigel Mansell in 1992, Alain Prost in 1993, Damon Hill in 1996 and Jacques Villeneuve in 1997.

As operations manager of the engines for Mecachrome / Supertec, he kept his area of responsibility after Renault's comeback as a works team in Formula 1 in 2002. At the end of 2007 Chevrier left the French outfit and was replaced by Rémi Taffin.
