= Eva Pebay-Peyroula =

French biologist and physicist

Eva Pebay-Peyroula (born 1956) is a French biologist and physicist. She studies the functions of membrane proteins and in particular membrane transporters.

== Biography ==
=== Studies ===
Eva Pebay-Peyroula studied at Lycée Stendhal in Grenoble, where she developed an interest in science. She then enrolled in the preparatory classes for the "Grandes Écoles". She initially pursued meteorology and enrolled in a school to study this field, but later shifted to physics at the University of Grenoble-Alpes, earning a master's degree. In 1979, she obtained her agrégation in physics and taught for two years at a high school in Nimes. She then completed a "Diplome d'études approfondies" (DEA) on the interaction between radiation and matter and decided to turn to research. She did her doctoral research in atomic physics at the Laboratoire national des champs magnétiques intense under the direction of Rémy Jost. In 1986, she defended her doctoral thesis on ethanedial at Joseph-Fourier University.

=== Career ===
After her thesis, she obtained a position as a research fellow at the CNRS at the Laue-Langevin Institute. In 1989, she was appointed lecturer at Joseph-Fourier University. In 1992, she joined the Institute of Structural Biology. In 1994 she obtained a university degree and became a professor in 1995 at the University of Grenoble-Alpes. In 2001, she created the membrane protein laboratory at the Institute of Structural Biology. From 2004 to 2014, she was director of this institute. In May 2010, she was appointed chairman of the board of directors of the National Research Agency (ANR). She held this position until 2012. She has been a member of the Strategic Research Council since 2014.

=== Family ===
She is married and has three children.

== Positions and awards ==
- 1994 to 1999: junior member of the Institut universitaire de France
- 30 November 2004: election to the French Academy of Sciences
- 2005: CNRS silver medal
- 2006: Senior member of the Institut universitaire de France
- 2007: Chevalier of the Ordre national de la Légion d'Honneur National Order of the Legion of Honour
- 2016: Officer of the Ordre national de la Légion d'Honneur
