= French Office for Biodiversity =

The French Office for Biodiversity (OFB; French: Office français de la biodiversité) is an établissement public à caractère administratif within the Government of France. It is under the control of both the Ministry of the Ecological Transition and Ministry of Agriculture and Food. It conducts research and enforces government policies on wildlife and the environment.

The OFB, located in Vincennes, was established on 1 January 2020 as the new entity succeeding the French Agency for Biodiversity (primarily in charge of national parks and other protected areas) and the National Office for Hunting and Wildlife. It has 2,800 agents (including 1,900 in territorial entities and in the overseas territories). Of these agents, 1,800 are environmental inspectors exercising the police powers of the OFB.

== History ==
The OFB was founded in 2020 with the merging of the French Agency for Biodiversity and the National Hunting and Wildlife Office of France. The Agency for Biodiversity had been founded in 2016 through a merger of National Office for Water and Aquatic Environments (the former Higher Fisheries Council) with the National Park Service of France and the Marine Protected Areas Agency.

== Responsibilities ==
OFB conducts research and provides expertise on species, environments and their uses. It provides support for government environmental policies and assists managers of national areas. CFB also strives to educate the public on biodiversity issues and gain their support for conservation.

== Organisation ==
- National level, where the policy and strategy of the OFB are defined and managed (bureaus of the OFB)
- Regional level, where coordination and territorial variation are exercised (regional bureau)
- Departemental and local levels, of operational and specific implementation (departemental services, front offices, nine marine natural parks and the Agoa marine mammal sanctuary, and 26 nature reserves)

== Environmental police ==
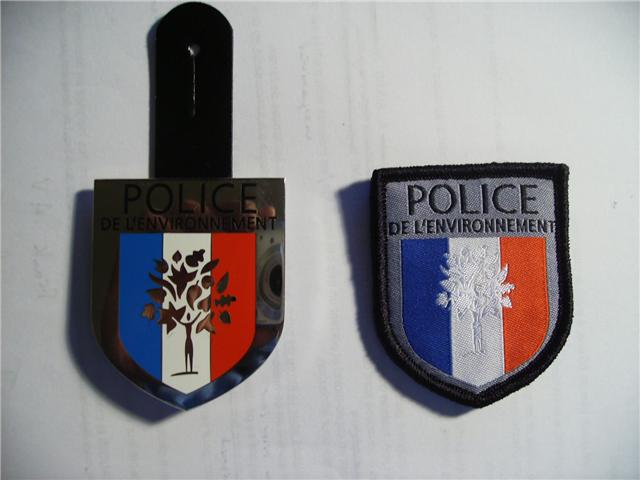
Environmental police badges

OFB contributes to the exercise of administrative and judicial policies relating to water (pollution of the resource, damage to wetlands or the coast), natural areas, flora and wild fauna (game species or protected, fight against trafficking in species), hunting (counter-poaching, strengthening hunting security) and fishing. The OFB also organizes the review of the hunting license and issues the license.

To fulfill this mission, environmental inspectors have certain criminal investigation powers enabling them to search for and find certain environmental offenses. Commissioned by ministerial decision and sworn in by the judicial authority, they exercise their judicial police missions under the authority of the public prosecutor. The environmental police also includes the administrative police.

Within the OFB, environmental technicians exercise these missions under the authority of the departmental prefect. They issue technical opinions on projects subject to administrative instruction at the request of the prefect, and carry out administrative checks on compliance with environmental regulations.

== Insignia ==
Insignia					
Function	Directeur général (Director General)	Directeur général délégué - directeur général adjoint (Deputy Director General, Assistant Director General)	Directeur - directeur régional ou interrégional - délégué mer (Director - regional or interregional director - sea delegate)	Directeur adjoint - directeur régional ou interrégional adjoint - directeur délégué de parc national marin - chargé de mission à la direction de l'évaluation et de la transformation; chargé de mission à l'inspection santé et sécurité au travail (Deputy Director - Deputy Regional or Interregional Director - Deputy Director of the National Marine Park - Project Manager at the Evaluation and Transformation Directorate; Project Manager at the Work Health and Safety Inspection)	Directeur adjoint de parc national marin - chef de service national, régional ou interrégional, départemental ou interdépartemental - responsable national - chef de pôle des brigades mobiles d'intervention - chef de service de parc national marin - chef d'unité spécialisée migrateurs (Deputy Director of a National Marine Park - Head of National, Regional or Interregional, Departmental or Interdepartmental Service - National Manager - Head of Mobile Intervention Brigades Unit - Head of the National Marine Park Service - Head of Specialized Migratory Unit)

Insignia				
Function	Chef de service adjoint national, régional ou interrégional, départemental ou interdépartemental - chef de brigade de inspecteurs du permis de chasser - chargé de recherche - chargé de mission de recherche - chef de brigade de la direction des grands prédateurs terrestres (National, regional or interregional, departmental or interdepartmental deputy head of service - head of hunting license inspector brigade - research officer - research mission officer - head of brigade of the large land predators department)	Conservateur de réserve - chef d'unité de service départemental ou interdépartemental, de parc national marin, d'unité spécialisée migrateurs - chef de brigade mobile d'intervention - chef de brigade adjoint de la direction des grands prédateurs terrestres (Curator of nature reserve - head of departmental or interdepartmental service unit, marine national park, specialized migratory unit - head of mobile intervention brigade - deputy head of brigade of the large land predators department)	Agent de service de police ou de service connaissances national, régional ou interrégional et départemental ou interdépartemental (Officer of police service or of national, regional or of interregional and departmental or interdepartmental knowledge service )	Agent stagiaire (Trainee Officer)

== See also ==
- List of national parks of France
- Water agency (France)
