= OR-7 =

First wolf in western Oregon since 1947 and in California since 1924

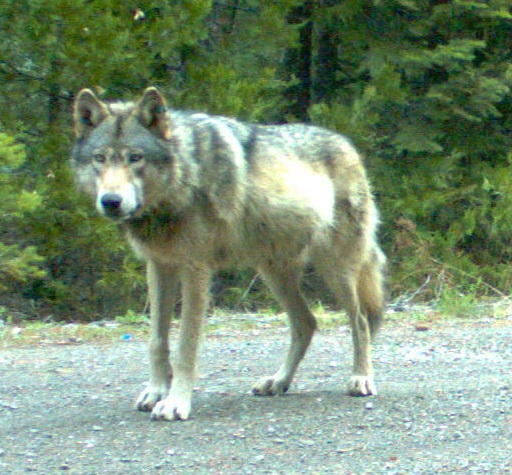
- OR-7 in Jackson County, Oregon, in May 2014
- Other name: Journey
- Species: Gray wolf (Canis lupus)
- Breed: Northwestern wolf subspecies (C. l. occidentalis)
- Sex: Male
- Born: April 2009; Oregon
- Died: 2020 (presumed)
- Nationality: United States
- Parents: B-300F/OR-2F (mother) & OR-4M
- Offspring: 7 pups
- Weight: 90 lb (41 kg) in February 2011
- Appearance: Gray
- Named after: 7th wolf collared in Oregon

OR-7, also known as Journey, was a male gray wolf that was electronically tracked as he migrated from the Wallowa Mountains in the northeastern corner of the U.S. state of Oregon to the southern Cascade Range. After the wolf dispersed from his natal pack in 2011, he wandered generally southwest for more than 1,000 miles (1,600 km) through Oregon and northern California. He was the first confirmed wild wolf in western Oregon since 1947 and the first in California since 1924.

By 2014, OR-7 had settled in the Rogue River watershed in the southern Cascade Range east of Medford, Oregon, with a mate. It is not known when the two wolves met, but DNA tests of fecal samples showed that she is related to wolves in two of the eight packs in northeastern Oregon. In early 2015, officials designated the two adult wolves and their offspring as the Rogue Pack, the first wolf pack in western Oregon and the state's ninth overall since wolves returned to Oregon from Idaho in the 1990s. The batteries in OR-7's tracking collar expired in October 2015, and monitoring the pack since then has depended on trail cameras and live sightings. Meanwhile, other wolves have migrated into the mountainous cross-border region, and relatives of OR–7 have formed two packs in northern California.

OR-7 was not observed at the 2020 winter count of wolves in Oregon, and as of April 2020 is presumed to have died.

== Background ==
Wolves in the United States were protected under the federal Endangered Species Act in 1978 as they were in danger of going extinct and needed protection to aid their recovery. Wolves were reintroduced to Idaho and expanded their range into the northern Rocky Mountains and Pacific Northwest. When wolves began swimming the Snake River from Idaho to Oregon in the 1990s, the Oregon Department of Fish and Wildlife (ODFW) started live-trapping the growing wolf population in Oregon and fitting them with GPS tracking collars that provide daily satellite position reports. State biologists gave a sequential designation to each wolf with a collar. The vast majority remain clustered in their historic range in the northeast corner of the state, where the forests between the high mountains and populated areas are full of elk and deer. In 2010, state biologists noticed wolves in the Cascade Range but were unable to determine if they were single dispersing animals wandering through or were starting to occupy the area. Individual wolves will roam, searching for a mate and new territory. In February 2011, the Oregon Department of Fish and Wildlife attached radio collars to several wolves in the Imnaha Pack in northeastern Oregon to allow study of their migration. The pack was Oregon's first since wolves returned to the state. The wolves were numbered; one of them, a year-old male from the pack's second litter, was given the code OR-7 as the seventh wolf to be collared.

== Migration ==
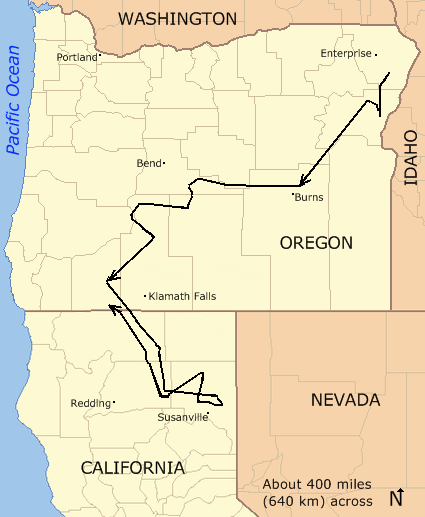
Approximate route of OR-7 between September 2011 and March 2012

As is common for non-dominant wolf males, OR-7 left the Imnaha Pack in the Wallowa Mountains near Joseph in September 2011, presumably in search of a mate. In November, he became the first wolf detected in western Oregon in more than 60 years when he was photographed east of Butte Falls by an automatic trail camera. This marked the first known wild wolf presence in southwestern Oregon since 1946.

The wolf crossed the border into northern California in late December, becoming the first documented wolf in the state since 1924. OR-7 remained in California, trekking through Siskiyou, Shasta and Lassen counties until heading north to Klamath County, Oregon, in March 2012. OR-7 soon made his way to Jackson County. By then the wolf had traveled more than 1,000 miles (1,600 km). OR-7 returned to California, spending the summer in the Plumas National Forest south of Mount Lassen, and as of December 2012 had migrated to near Lake Almanor. He returned to Oregon in March 2013.

OR-7's migration captured the attention of viewers around the world after the story "went viral" in early December 2011. In 2012, OR-7 was named "Journey" through an art and naming competition for children sponsored by the non-profit group Oregon Wild. The conservation group acknowledged that the naming contest "was part of an effort to make the wolf too famous to kill". Steve Pedery, conservation director of Oregon Wild, said of the wolf: "Journey is the most famous wolf in the world. It is not surprising that the paparazzi finally caught up with him."

== Pack formation ==
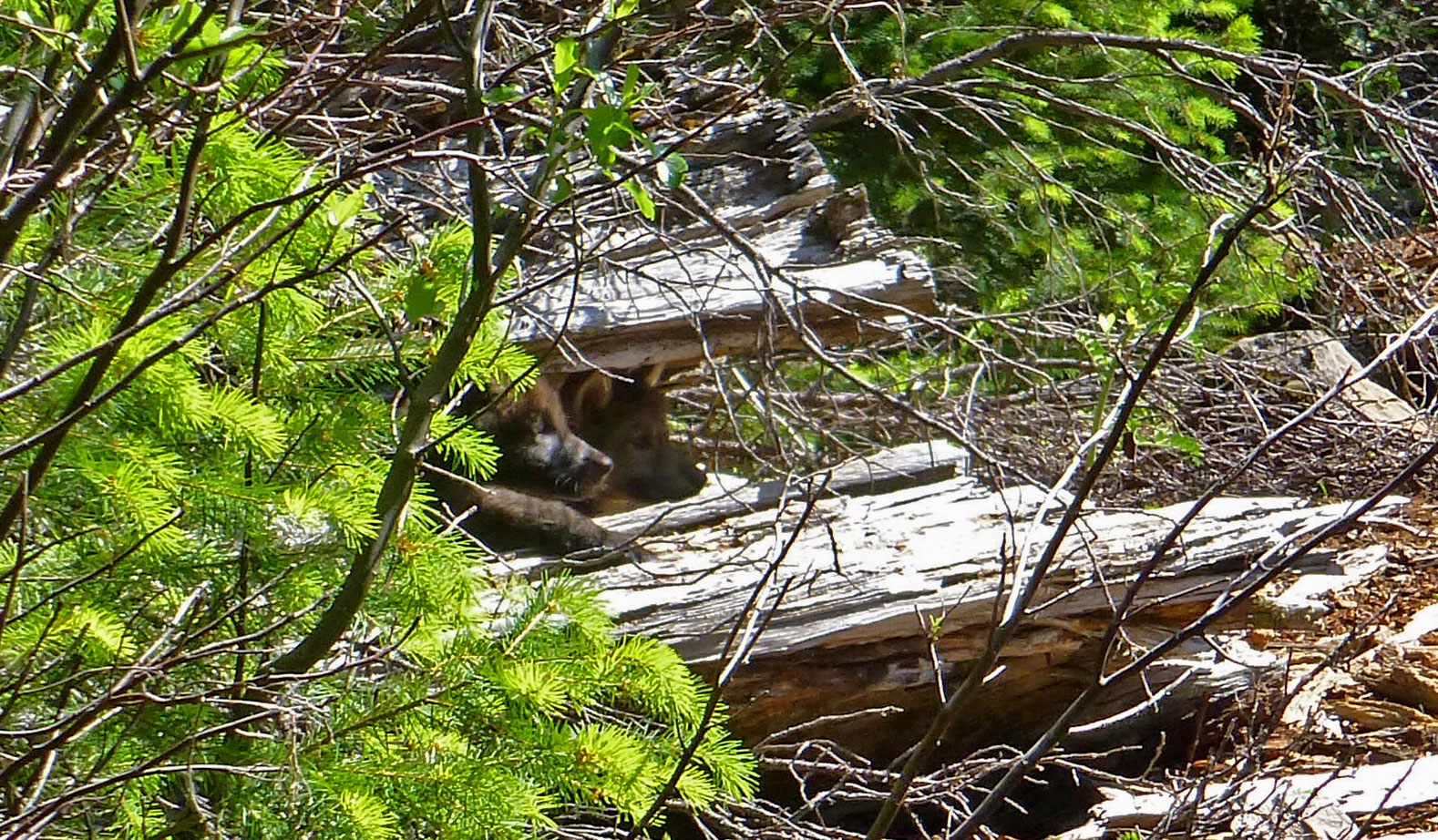
Two wolf pups of about 6-weeks of age in Southern Oregon. OR-7 is the father, and a wolf from the Minam and Snake River packs is the mother.

In May 2014, remote cameras in the Rogue River – Siskiyou National Forest captured photographs of OR-7 along with a female wolf who might have mated with him. A month later, biologists from the United States Fish and Wildlife Service and the ODFW returned to southwest Oregon, photographed two wolf pups, and took fecal samples for DNA testing to determine the relationship of the pups to OR-7. By September, tests run at the University of Idaho confirmed that OR-7's mate is a wolf, that the two pups are their offspring, and that the mate is related to the wolves in the Minam and Snake River packs of northeastern Oregon.

The birth of wolf pups so close to the state border raised the probability of a future long-term wolf population in California. In June 2014, the California Fish and Game Commission voted 3–1 to protect those wolves under the state Endangered Species Act.

The adult wolves and their pups remained east of Medford in the Rogue River watershed, and in early 2015 officials named the group the Rogue Pack, the ninth contemporary wolf pack in Oregon. By July, wildlife biologists found evidence that OR-7 and his mate had produced a second litter of pups. A month later, trail cameras identified two new pups, bringing the known total of wolves in this pack to seven. By 2016, the pack size had grown to nine.

The batteries in OR–7's GPS tracking unit expired in October 2015. Officials decided to replace the collar in order to keep track of the pack, which is protected under Oregon law and the federal Endangered Species Act. However, attempts to trap OR-7 or other members of the pack failed, and further tracking of OR-7 depended on trail cameras and live sightings. A trail camera in the Rogue River – Siskiyou National Forest captured an image of OR-7 and one of his offspring in early 2016. After four steers were killed by wolves in Wood River Valley in western Klamath County (immediately east of Jackson County) near where OR–7 was last seen, biologists said efforts to trap and re-collar the wolf would likely resume and that tracking could alert ranchers concerned about their livestock. On October 3, 2017, biologists caught and collared OR-54, another Rogue Pack wolf, thought to be OR-7's daughter, traveling with the pack in Wood River Valley. In lieu of another tracking device on OR-7, the collar on OR-54 would allow officials to track the movements and behaviors of the pack. OR-54 was then found dead on February 5, 2020, in Shasta County.

OR-7 was seen in Oregon in fall 2019 but was not found at the state count of wolves the following winter, and as of April 2020 is presumed to have died at about 11 years old, an advanced age for a wild wolf.

Since 2015, wolves outside the Rogue Pack have also migrated to western Oregon. These include what officials have termed the "Keno Pair" near Keno, further south in Klamath County, and the "Silver Lake Wolves" in Lake County. The Oregon wolf population reached an estimated minimum of 110 in 2015, and 112 in 2017.

== Further expansion in California ==
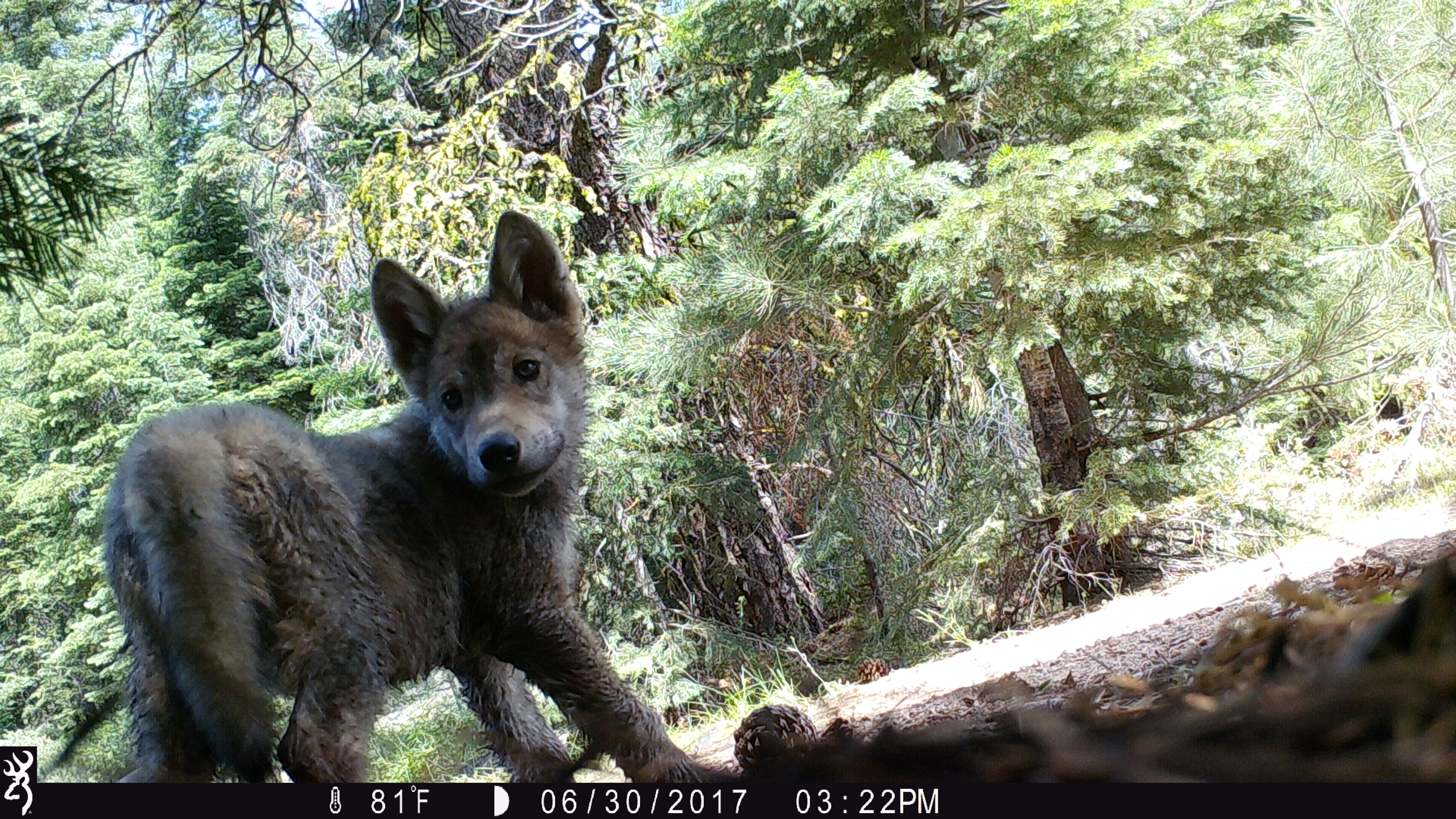
A pup from the Lassen Pack

In 2015, the California Department of Fish and Wildlife (CDFW) released a photo of the Shasta Pack, consisting of two adults and five pups in Siskiyou County, just south of the Oregon–California border. The breeding pair came from the same pack as OR-7, making them his siblings. In 2017, the CDFW and the U.S. Forest Service determined that at least three wolf pups from a second pack, the Lassen Pack, can be traced to OR-7. One of OR-7s male offspring mated with another wolf to produce the pups, the birth of which made Journey a grandfather. The Lassen Pack, which lives in Lassen National Forest, is California's second pack since wolves were eradicated from the state in the 1920s. In June 2017, CDFW biologists fitted the female of the Lassen Pack breeding pair with a tracking collar.

OR-85 is a male wolf that traveled from Oregon to Siskiyou County in November 2020. As of January 2021, another wolf, that biologists believe most likely to be a female, has joined up with OR-85 in this northernmost part of California. It is likely that other undetected wolves are dispersing through portions of their historic habitat in California. Further informations and updates from August 2021 documented litters from 2 of 3 packs/groups. The Whaleback Pack, which is composed of OR-85 and a female that is related to Oregon's Rogue Pack, had 7 pups and the Lassen Pack had 6 pups. The Lassen Pack is now led by LAS09F and LAS16M.

== In popular culture ==
German-born filmmaker Clemens Schenk, who lives in Bend, has created a documentary, OR7: The Journey. A look-alike wolf from Wolf People, an Idaho reserve, is the star of the film, which includes interviews with wolf experts as well as a woman who encountered OR-7 in the wild. The initial screening of the documentary took place in 2014 at the Hollywood Theatre in Portland.

Children's author Rosanne Parry's novel A Wolf Called Wander is based loosely on the story of OR-7.

OR-7 is also featured in Juliana Spahr's That Winter the Wolf Came (2015).

== See also ==
- List of grey wolf populations by country
- List of wolves
- Slavc
