= Water agency (France) =

Agency managing a hydrographic basin

A water agency in France, formerly called a basin agency, is a public administrative establishment that participates in water management within an administrative basin district, whose boundaries correspond to a large hydrographic basin. There are six of them, all established by the Water Law of 1964, specified by the Law of 3 January 1992. The hydrographic basins of the overseas departments of Guadeloupe, French Guiana, Martinique, and Réunion are equipped with a Water Office, with equivalent missions.

In 2000 the European Union created hydrographic districts based on the model of these basin agencies; in other countries their activities are fulfilled by a water board.

== In Metropolitan France ==
=== Status and missions ===
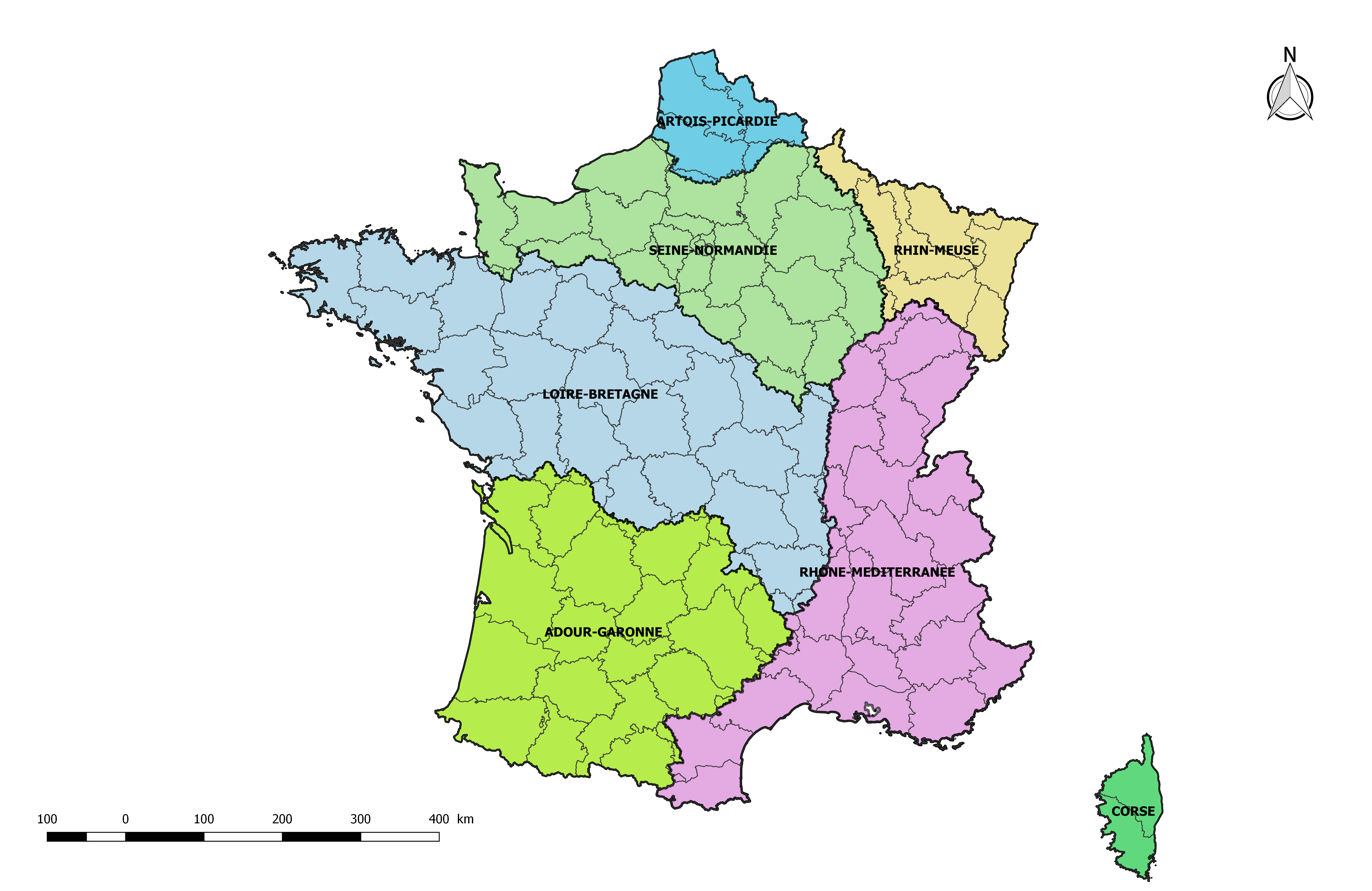
Map of basin districts in Metropolitan France, territories of competence of the water agencies. Only the Rhône-Mediterranean-Corsica agency covers two basin districts (Rhône-Mediterranean and Corsica).

In France, a water agency's mission is to initiate, on the scale of its watershed, rational use of water resources, the fight against pollution, and the protection of aquatic environments. It is notably responsible for coordinating the master plan for water development and management (SDAGE) and the water development and management plans (SAGE) that stem from it.

It is a public administrative establishment of the state, endowed with legal personality and financial autonomy under the dual supervision of the Ministry responsible for the environment and that of the Ministry responsible for finance. Water agencies have regulatory power to determine, within the limits of the missions assigned to them by law, the areas and conditions of their action and to define the general conditions for the allocation of financial assistance that they can provide to public and private entities in the form of subsidies, performance bonuses, or repayable advances (Council of State, 11 March 2020, No. 426366).

They collect fees from users (withdrawal fees, pollution fees). The proceeds from fees, under the impetus of a board of directors bringing together various stakeholders in the water sector (administrations, users, local authorities), enable them to provide financial assistance for actions of common interest in the water sector carried out by local authorities, industries, and farmers (wastewater treatment, production of high-quality drinking water, implementation of cleaner production processes, restoration and maintenance of aquatic environments, etc.).

French water agencies also conduct cooperation policies in this area (Balkans, Vietnam, West Africa, Palestine).

=== 2008–2010: Post-Grenelle ===
In 2008 the Grenelle Environment Forum stipulates that water agencies may (from 2009 to 2014) acquire 20,000 hectares of wetlands (with the Coastal Conservancy) for environmental conservation and development of the Blue Framework, as part of the Green and Blue Framework.

In 2009 on World Wetlands Day, Chantal Jouanno (Secretary of State for Ecology) announces the creation of a national group formed on the model of the Grenelle Environment Forum (thus involving the State, social partners, NGOs, and local authorities) tasked with taking stock and proposing measures for the preservation and restoration of wetlands.

In 2009 the explanatory memorandum of the Grenelle II Law estimates that there are still around 1.5 million hectares of wetlands in France, which are a "biodiversity reservoir and a factor in improving the quality of surface waters, buffer zones reducing the risk of flooding in the event of heavy rainfall, and significant storage of organic carbon in soils", but are "often threatened by the expansion of urbanization or changes in land use." The law provides that agencies are invited to conduct "an active land acquisition policy in wetlands not covered by the CELRL's jurisdiction"; as a "last resort, after considering reclamation and restoration options" (explanatory memorandum of Article 51 of the Grenelle II Law), and that they must manage these 20,000 ha through agricultural leases (Article 51).

=== 2016: biodiversity law ===
The passing of the Law for the Reconquest of Biodiversity, Nature, and Landscapes in 2016 introduces significant changes in the objectives of water agencies with a strengthening of their support for biodiversity. Until now, the preservation of aquatic environments was indeed a priority (acquisition of wetlands, restoration of rivers, etc.) with nearly 200 million euros per year or 10 % of the amount of fees. From 2016 onwards, the missions of the water agencies are expanded to include:

- restoration of green and blue networks,
- priority given to estuaries, retro-littoral zones, and upper watersheds,
- partnership with the French Biodiversity Agency,
- amounting to more than 20–30 million euros per year.

According to France Nature Environnement, water agencies increasingly contribute to financing, at the expense of their primary mission, which is to protect the water resource, other policies of the Ministry of Ecological and Solidarity Transition, especially biodiversity. As of 2018, only water agencies will finance the French Biodiversity Agency. Water agencies also finance organic agriculture.

=== Pollutions ===
Between 2008 and 2015, while pesticides were supposed to "if possible" decrease by half, their use increased by 22 %: this is therefore a failure. To better circumvent water law, the capillary network upstream of rivers is simply wiped off the map, which could pave the way for increased pesticide use. Bird populations are declining sharply, linked to the disappearance of insects due to pesticides. According to IPBES, the decline in biodiversity worldwide is alarming, to the point that it could compromise the well-being of human beings.

Rivers and streams are vectors for transporting plastics to the oceans. So according to the University of Basel, for example, the Rhine discharges 191 million floating plastic particles into the sea every day.

== Equivalents abroad ==
The French water agency is inspired by the Genossenschaften, German cooperative water management unions, the first of which managed the Emscher basin as early as 1904.

In the same spirit Spain created Hydrographic Confederations in 1940, and Britain established the Regional water authorities in 1975.

In the Netherlands it is the (Dutch) Water boards.

== See also ==
- Barcelona Convention
- OSPAR Convention
- Marine Strategy Framework Directive
- French Office for Biodiversity
- Riparian forest
- Schéma directeur d'aménagement et de gestion des eaux
