= Groupe des écoles nationales d'ingénieurs =

Network of French public engineering schools

Groupe des écoles nationales d'ingénieurs (French pronunciation: [ɡʁup dez‿ekɔl nɑsjɔnal dɛ̃ʒenjœʁ]; Groupe ENI) is French for "Group of French National Engineering Schools", a network of 4 French public engineering schools that deliver the title of Diplôme d'Ingénieur in a wide variety of fields.

== Member institutions ==
- École nationale d'ingénieurs de Brest (ENIB)
- École nationale d'ingénieurs de Metz (ENIM)
- École nationale d'ingénieurs de Saint-Etienne (ENISE)
- École nationale d'ingénieurs de Tarbes (ENIT)

== See also ==
- Diplôme d'Ingénieur
- Grandes écoles
- Education in France
