= École nationale d'ingénieurs de Metz =

French grande ecole of engineering

- Type: Public
- Established: 1960
- Affiliations: Conférence des Grandes Écoles
- Students: 1000
- Location: Metz, France; 49.12°N 6.16°E
- Website: enim.univ-lorraine.fr
- Location in Lorraine École nationale d'ingénieurs de Metz (France)

École nationale d'ingénieurs de Metz (French pronunciation: [ekɔl nɑsjɔnal dɛ̃ʒenjœʁ də mɛs]; abbr. ENI Metz or ENIM) is a French grande ecole of engineering established in 1960. It is one of the Groupe des écoles nationales d'ingénieurs (ENI Group), but also an internal school of the Collegium National Polytechnic Institute of Lorraine (INPL).

It is an engineering school oriented towards mechanics and production but which, through the diversity of its training, falls into the category of so-called “generalist” schools.

Located in Metz, the ENIM is a higher public education institution recognised by the State. The school is a member of the Conférence des Grandes Écoles (CGE).

== Notable alumni ==
- Denis Chevrier, a retired Formula One engineer who was the head of engine operations for the Renault F1 team from 2002 to 2007.
