= École nationale d'ingénieurs de Brest =

School of engineers in France

Coordinates: 48°21′38″N 4°33′58″W

Brest National Engineering School
- École nationale d'ingénieurs de Brest
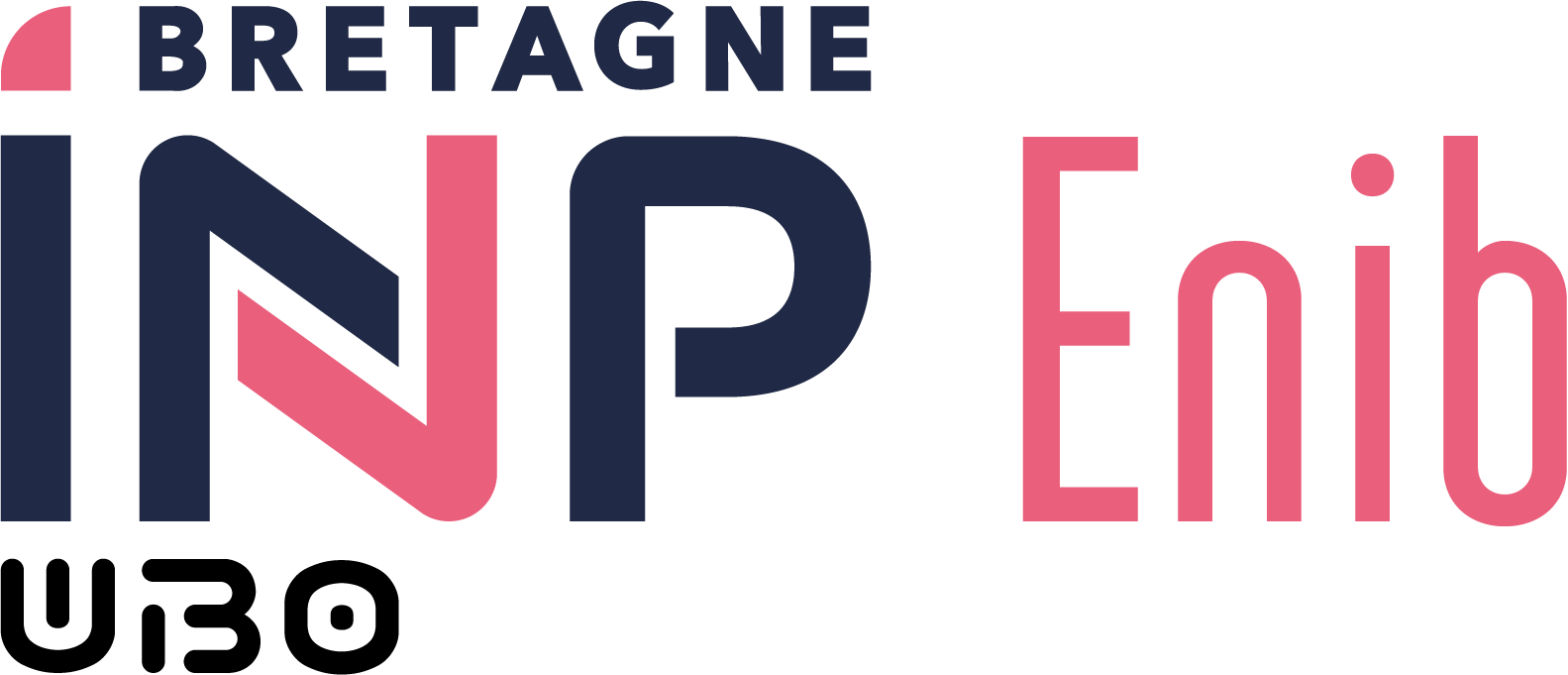
- Type: graduate
- Established: 1961; 65 years ago
- Affiliations: Institut Mines-Télécom
- Director: Sébastien Chambres
- Location: Plouzané, France
- Website: www.enib.fr

The École nationale d'ingénieurs de Brest (French pronunciation: [ekɔl nɑsjɔnal dɛ̃ʒenjœʁ də bʁɛst]; ENIB) is a French grande école leading to the French Diplôme d'Ingénieur under the authority of the French Ministry of Education and Research.

== Introduction ==
ENIB is located on the Technopole Brest-Iroise in Plouzané. The school is attached to the University of Western Brittany.

This school is part of the ENI group and provides an engineer training certified by the Ministry of Higher Education and Research in the fields of electronics, of computer engineering and Mechatronics.

The course lasts 5 years, 3 years or 2 years according to the degree when entering the school.

== Admission ==
The main admission to the ENIB is made through a selective examination during the year leading to the baccalauréat, most of the successful candidates come from the série scientifique or Bac S. There is however further possibility to join the ENIB later on after 2 years of studies in an IUT or at the University, the selection being on academic records.

== History ==
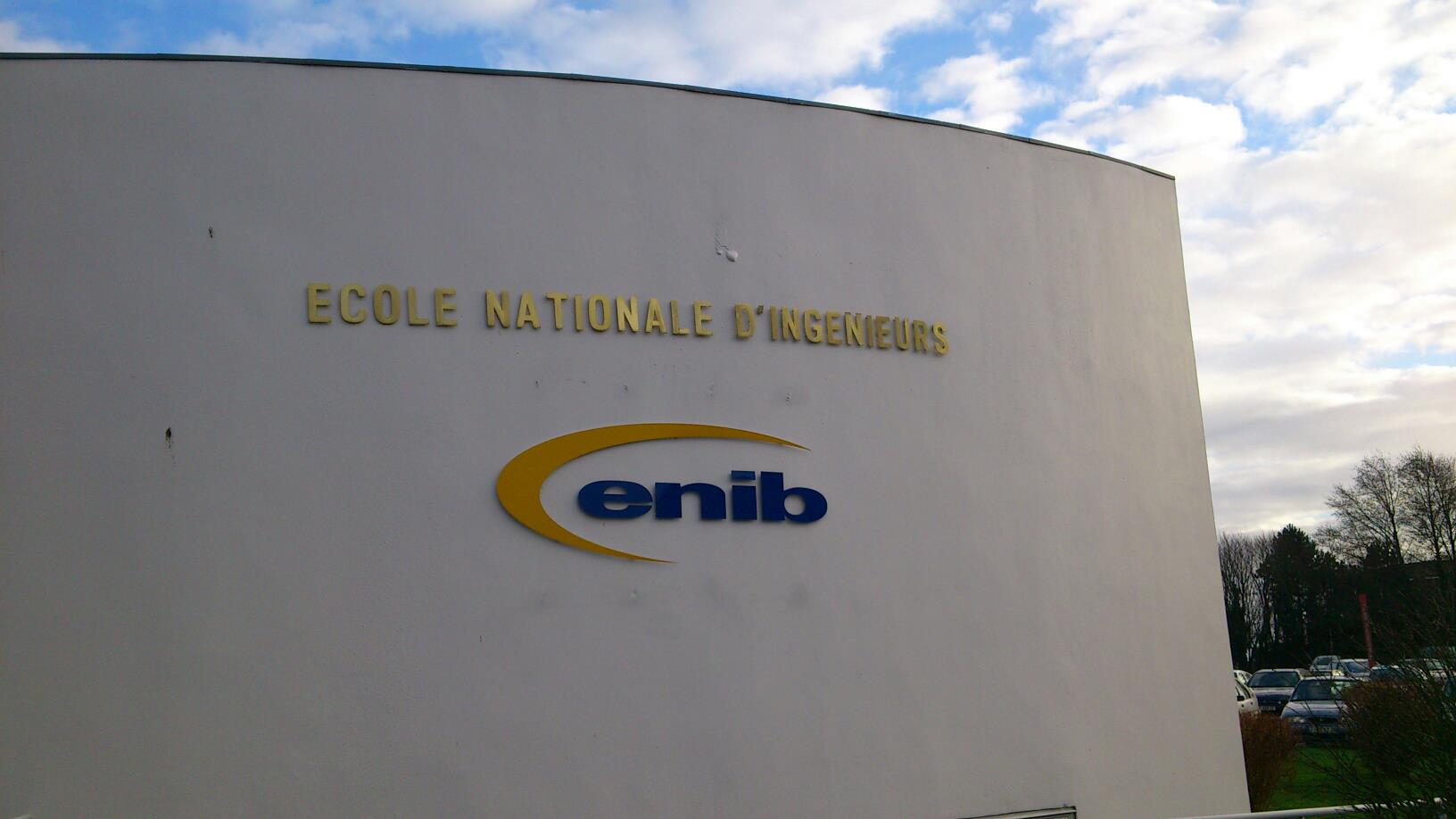
Former logo near entrance

- 1961 - Creation of the ENIB (in 4 years).
- 1987 - In 5 years. Diversification of recruitment, creation of two channels (electronics and industrial computing).
- 1988 - Establishment of the Research Laboratory for Electronics (RESO)
- 1990 - Establishment of research laboratory computer (LI2)
- 1991 - Ability to deliver a DEA in Electronics - Optronics.
- 1992 - New building (10 000 m^{2}) on the Technopole Brest-Iroise.
- 1994 - Authorization to issue a Master: Real Time Software Engineering and for Industrial Computing (GT2I).
- 1997 - Authorization for the Masters: Distributed Virtual Reality (SVR).
- 2000 - Opening of a mechatronics channel.
- 2004 - New 4000 m^{2} extension building and creation of the European Center for Virtual Reality.
- 2006 - Establishment of the mechanics research laboratory.
- 2009 - Introduction of the Professional Systems and Services option.
- 2011 - Integration of electronic and computer labs in the Lab-STICC (UMR CNRS)
- 2012 - Inauguration of Student House
- 2013 - The Institut Mines-Télécom includes ENIB as an associate school
