= History of wolves in Yellowstone =

Extirpation and reintroduction of the gray wolf to Yellowstone National Park

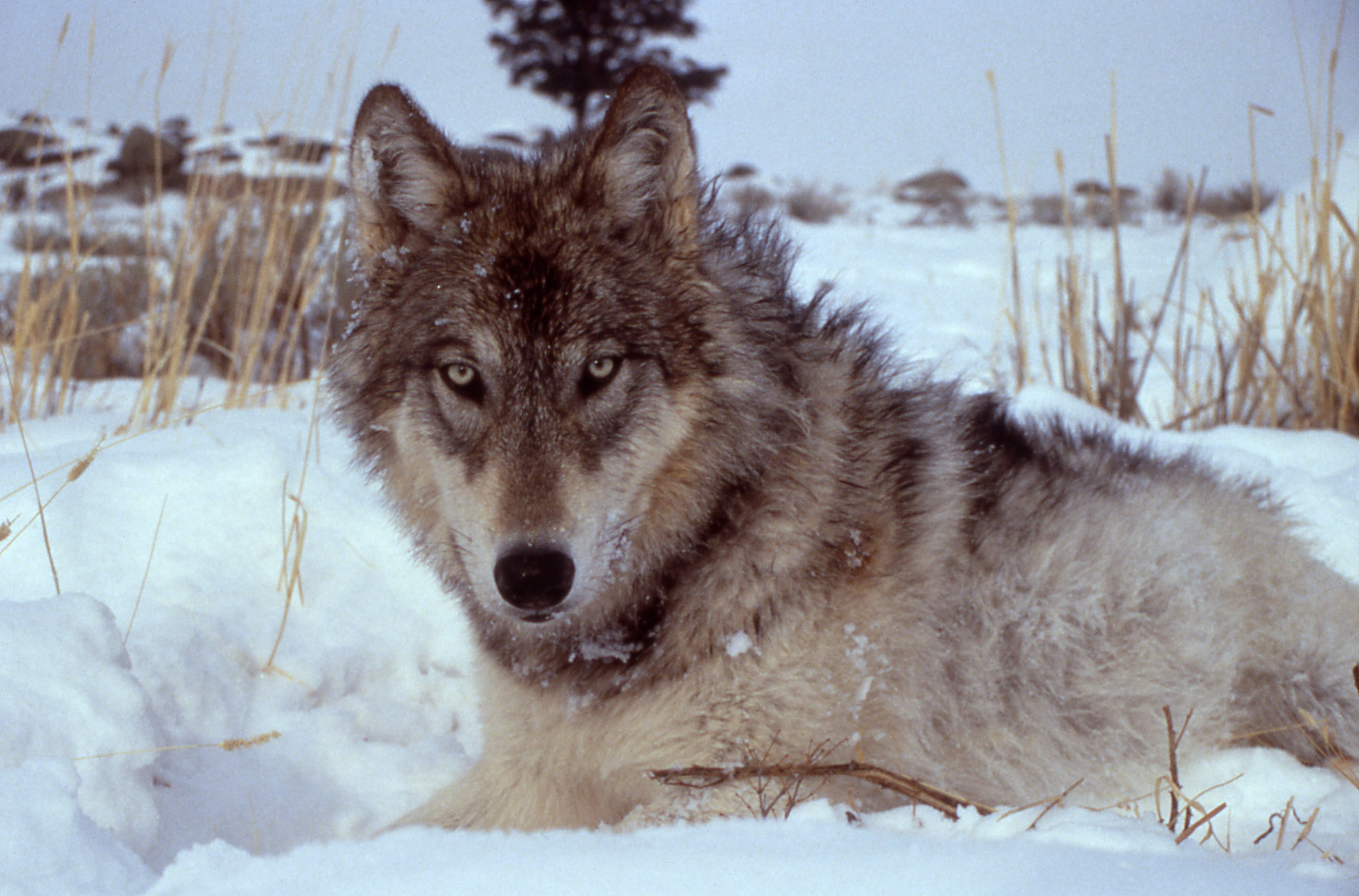
Wolf after re-introduction

The history of wolves in Yellowstone includes the extirpation, absence and reintroduction of wild populations of the gray wolf (Canis lupus) to Yellowstone National Park and the Greater Yellowstone Ecosystem. When the park was created in 1872, wolf populations were already in decline in Montana, Wyoming and Idaho. The creation of the national park did not provide protection for wolves or other predators, and government predator control programs in the first decades of the 1900s essentially helped eliminate the gray wolf from Yellowstone. The last wolves were killed in Yellowstone in 1926. After that, sporadic reports of wolves still occurred, but scientists confirmed in the mid-1900s that sustainable gray wolf populations had been extirpated and were absent from Yellowstone as well as 48 states.

Beginning in the 1950s, park managers, biologists, conservationists, and environmentalists began what would ultimately turn into a campaign to reintroduce the gray wolf into Yellowstone National Park. When the Endangered Species Act of 1973 was passed, the road to legal reintroduction was made clear. In 1995, gray wolves were reintroduced into Yellowstone in the Lamar Valley. The reintroduction of wolves in Yellowstone has long been contentious, as have wolf reintroductions worldwide.

== Extirpation (1872–1926) ==
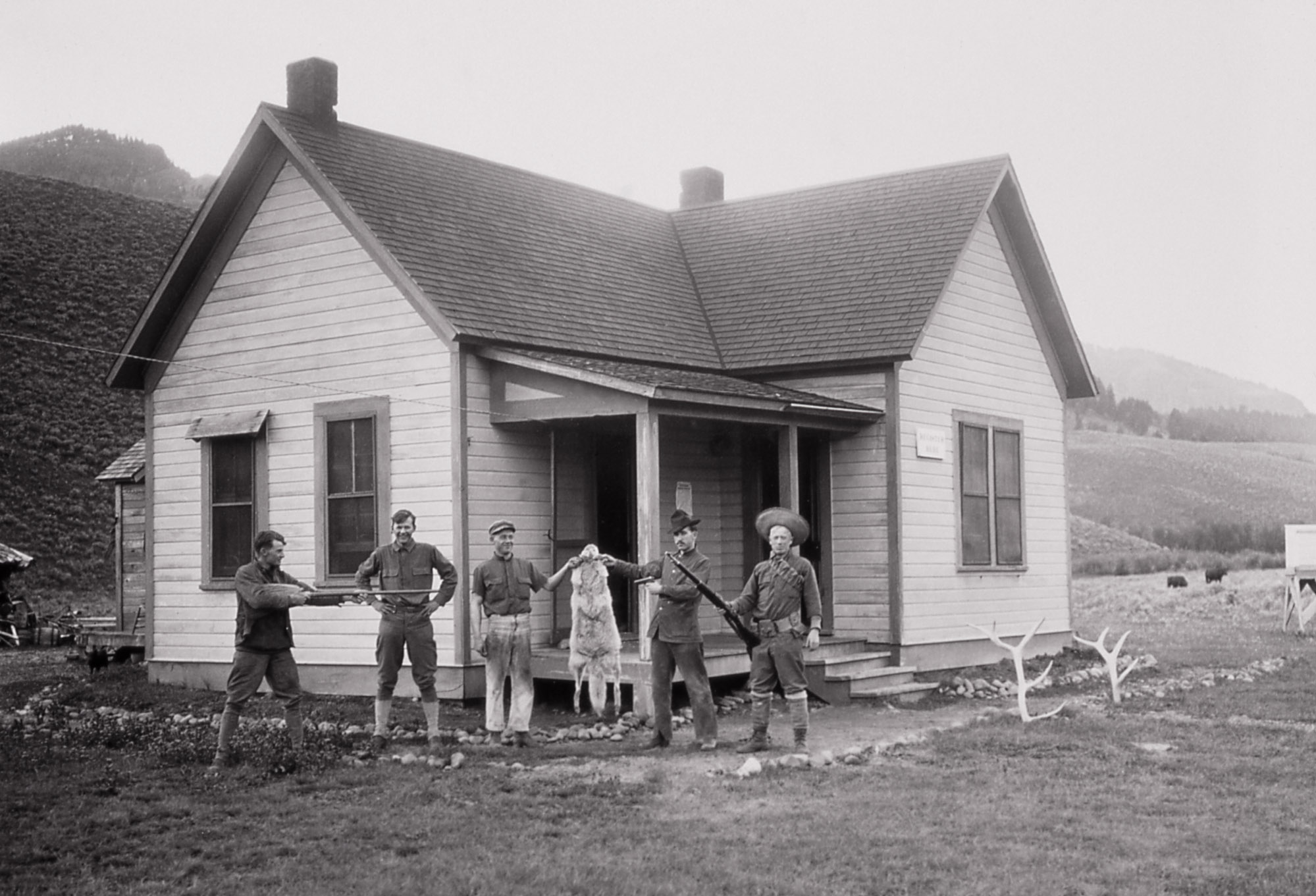
Soldiers displaying wolf pelt at Soda Butte Creek patrol station, 1905

In 1872, when Yellowstone National Park was created, there was not yet any legal protection for wildlife in the park. In the early years of the park, administrators, hunters, and tourists were essentially free to kill any game or predator they came across. The gray wolf was especially vulnerable to this wanton killing because it was generally considered an undesirable predator and was already being deliberately exterminated throughout its North American range, usually in the interest of protecting livestock. In January 1883, United States Secretary of the Interior Henry M. Teller issued regulations prohibiting the hunting of most park animals, but the regulations did not apply to wolves, coyotes, bears, mountain lions, and other small predators.

Shortly after the U.S. Army took over administration of the park on August 1, 1890, Captain Moose Harris, the first military superintendent, allowed public hunting of any wildlife and left all predator control to the park's administration. Official records show, however, that the U.S. Army did not begin to implement a policy of killing wolves until 1914.

In 1885, Congress created the Division of Economic Ornithology and Mammalogy with the express purpose of conducting scientific research for the protection of wildlife. The agency soon became the U.S. Biological Survey, which was in turn the forerunner of the U.S. Fish and Wildlife Service. In 1907, under political pressure from western cattle and livestock industries, this agency began a concerted predator control program which was eventually called Animal Damage Control. This program resulted in the deaths of an estimated 1,800 wolves and 23,000 coyotes in 39 U.S. National Forests in 1907 alone. In 1916, when the National Park Service was created, its enabling legislation included words that authorized the Secretary of the Interior to "provide in his discretion for the destruction of such animals and of such plant life as may be detrimental to the use of said parks, monuments and reservations".

It is generally accepted that sustainable gray wolf packs had been extirpated from Yellowstone National Park by 1926, although the National Park Service maintained its policies of predator control in the park until 1933. However, a 1975–1977 National Park Service-sponsored study revealed that during the period from 1927 to 1977, there were several hundred probable sightings of wolves in the park. Between 1977 and the reintroduction of wolves in 1995, there were additional reliable sightings of wolves in the park, most believed to be singles or pairs transiting the region rather than permanently inhabiting the park.

=== Official records of wolves killed ===
Prior to the National Park Service assuming control of the park in 1916, the U.S. Army killed 14 wolves during their tenure (1886–1916), most in the years 1914–15. In 1940, Adolph Murie, a noted wildlife biologist published his Fauna Series No. 4— Fauna of the National Parks of the United States-Ecology of the Coyote in the Yellowstone National Park. In this report, Murie tallied the number of wolves killed as reported annually by park administrators between 1915 and 1935:

From the Superintendent's Annual Report:
Year	Number killed
1915	7
1916	14
1917	4
1918	36
1919	6
1920	28
1921	12
1922	24
1923	8
1924–1935	0

Updated research in the 1980s verified that the last official killing of wolves in the park took place in 1926 when two pups found near Soda Butte Creek were killed by park rangers. The last reported wolf killed in the Greater Yellowstone Ecosystem (prior to today's legal hunting or control measures) occurred in May 1943 when Leo Cottenoir, a Native American sheepherder on the Wind River Reservation shot a wolf near the southern border of the park.

== Absence (1926–1995) ==
=== Ecological impacts ===
Once the wolves were gone, elk populations began to rise. Over the next few years, conditions of Yellowstone National Park declined drastically. A team of scientists visiting Yellowstone in 1929 and 1933 reported, "The range was in deplorable conditions when we first saw it, and its deterioration has been progressing steadily since then." By this time many biologists were worried about eroding land and plants dying off. The elk were multiplying inside the park and deciduous, woody species such as aspen and cottonwood suffered from overgrazing. The park service started trapping and moving the elk and, when that was not effective, killing them. Elk population control methods continued for more than 30 years. Elk control prevented further degradation of the range, but didn't improve its overall condition. At times, people would mention bringing wolves back to Yellowstone to help control the elk population. Yellowstone's managers were not eager to bring back wolves, especially after so successfully extirpating them from the park. Elk control continued into the 1960s. In the late 1960s, local hunters began to complain to their congressmen that there were too few elk, and the congressmen threatened to stop funding Yellowstone. Killing elk was given up as a control method which allowed elk populations to again rise. As elk populations rose, the quality of the range decreased affecting many other animals. Without wolves, coyote populations increased dramatically which adversely impacted the pronghorn antelope population. However, it was the overly large elk populations that caused the most profound changes to the ecosystem of Yellowstone with the absence of wolves.

=== Reintroduction initiatives ===
The campaign to restore the gray wolf in Yellowstone had its roots in a number of seminal studies related to the predator-prey ecology of the park. In 1940, Adolph Murie published Ecology of the Coyote in the Yellowstone National Park. That study and his 1940–41 work The Wolves of Mount McKinley was instrumental in building a scientific foundation for wolf conservation. In 1944, noted wildlife biologist Aldo Leopold, once an avid predator control advocate, made the following comments in his review of The Wolves of North America, Young and Goldman, 1944:

There still remains, even in the United States, some areas of considerable size in which we feel that both red and gray [wolves] may be allowed to continue their existence with little molestation. ... Where are these areas? Probably every reasonable ecologist will agree that some of them should lie in the larger national parks and wilderness areas: for instance Yellowstone and its adjacent national forests. ... Why, in the necessary process of extirpating wolves from livestock ranges of Wyoming and Montana, were not some of the uninjured animals used to restock Yellowstone?

— Aldo Leopold, 1944

By the 1960s, cultural and scientific understanding of ecosystems was changing attitudes toward the wolf and other large predators. In part, this included the emergence of Robert Paine's concept of the keystone species. In the early 1960s, Douglas Pimlott, a noted Canadian wildlife biologist was calling for the restorations of wolves in the northern rockies.

In 1970, American wolf expert, David Mech published The Wolf: The Ecology and Behavior of an Endangered Species (1970, 1981), an enlightening study of the wolf and its impact on its environment. In 1978, when wildlife biologist John Weaver published his seminal study Wolves of Yellowstone, he concluded the report with the following recommendation:

Therefore I recommend restoring this native predator by introducing wolves to Yellowstone

— John Weaver, National Park Service, 1978

The gray wolf was one of the first species to be listed as endangered (1967) under the Endangered Species Preservation Act of 1966. However, until the passage of the Endangered Species Act of 1973, there was no legal basis or process for re-introducing the gray wolf to Yellowstone National Park and the Greater Yellowstone Ecosystem. The Endangered Species Act obligated the U.S. Fish and Wildlife Service to develop restoration plans for each species designated as Endangered. The first recovery plan was completed in 1980 but gained little traction. In 1987, the U.S. Fish and Wildlife Service published a revised Northern Rocky Mountain Wolf Recovery Plan which led the way to wolf reintroduction. The plan was a cooperative effort between the National Park Service, Fish and Wildlife Service, academia, state wildlife agencies and environmental groups. Its Executive Summary contains the following:

The Northern Rocky Mountain Wolf Recovery Plan represents a "road map" to recovery 'of the gray wolf in' the Rocky Mountains. The primary goal of the plan is to remove the Northern Rocky Mountain wolf from the endangered and threatened species list by securing and maintaining a minimum of 10 breeding pairs of wolves in each of the three recovery areas for a minimum of three successive years.

— Northern Rocky Mountain Wolf Recovery Plan, USFWS, August 1987

In 1991, Congress directed the U.S. Fish and Wildlife Service to develop an Environmental Impact Statement (EIS) for the express purpose of reintroducing wolves into Yellowstone National Park and regions of Central Idaho. The final statement was published on April 14, 1994, and selected five potential alternatives for reestablishing wolves in Yellowstone and central Idaho to be seriously examined.

- Reintroduction of Experimental Populations (incorporating most of the state implemented nonessential reintroduction alternative with parts of the 1987 Recovery Plan).
- Natural Recovery (with limited land-use restrictions in anticipation of some illegal killing of wolves).
- No wolf (as proposed in alternative scoping).
- Wolf Management Committee (as proposed by Congress).
- Reintroduction of Non-experimental Wolves (incorporating the accelerated wolf recovery alternative but with fewer land-use restrictions)

Alternative 1 was the recommended and ultimately adopted alternative:

Reintroduction of Experimental Populations Alternative – The purpose of this alternative is to accomplish wolf recovery by reintroducing wolves designated as nonessential experimental populations to Yellowstone National Park and central Idaho and by implementing provisions within Section 10(j) of the ESA to conduct special management to address local concerns. The states and tribes would be encouraged to implement the special rules for wolf management outside national parks and national wildlife refuges under cooperative agreement with the FWS.

— EIS-The Reintroduction of Wolves to Yellowstone National Park and Central Idaho, 1994

The final EIS opened the way for re-introduction, but not without opposition. The Sierra Club and National Audubon Society opposed the re-introduction plan on the grounds that Experimental populations were not protected enough once the wolves were outside the park. The Farm Bureau's of Idaho, Wyoming and Montana opposed the plan on the basis that the wrong subspecies of wolf—Canis lupus occidentalis (northwestern wolf (Canada)) instead of Canis lupus irremotus (Northern Rocky Mountains wolf) was selected for reintroduction. These objections were overcome and in January 1995, the process of physically reintroducing wolves into Yellowstone began.

== Reintroduction (1995–present) ==
=== Initial releases 1995–96 ===
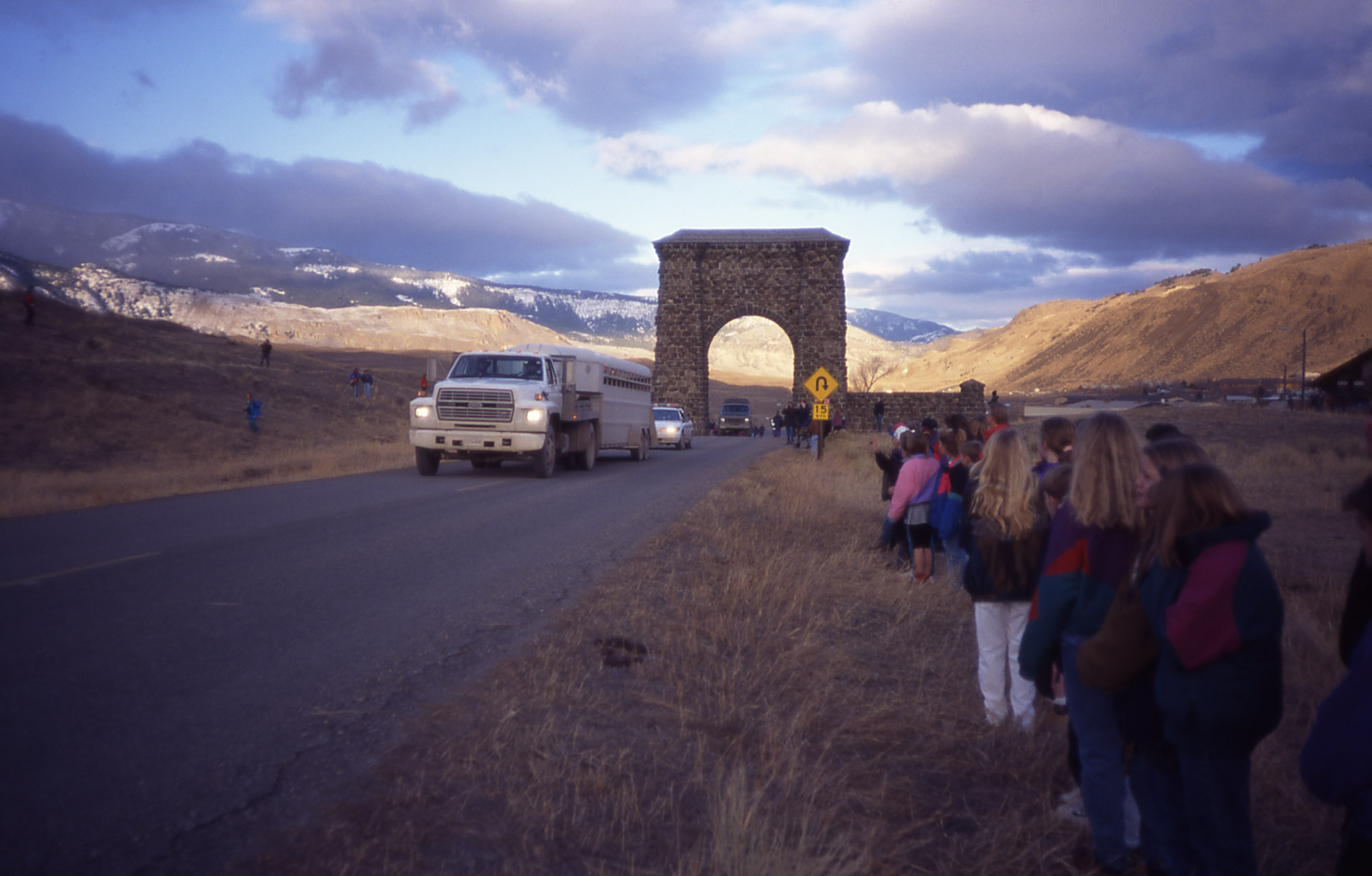
First wolves being transported into Yellowstone for release, January 1995

In January 1995, U.S. and Canadian wildlife officials captured 14 wolves from multiple packs east of Jasper National Park, near Hinton, Alberta, Canada. These wolves arrived in Yellowstone in two shipments—January 12, 1995 (8 wolves) and January 20, 1995 (6 wolves). They were released into three acclimation pens—Crystal Creek, Rose Creek and Soda Butte Creek in the Lamar Valley in Northeast East Yellowstone National Park. In March 1995, the pens were opened and between March 21 and March 31, 1995, all 14 wolves were loose in Yellowstone.

Seventeen additional wolves captured in Canada arrived in Yellowstone in January 1996 and were released into the park in April 1996 from the Chief Joseph, Lone Star, Druid Peak and Nez Perce pens. The reintroductions were planned on taking 3-5 years but these were the last wolves released into the park as officials believed that the natural reproduction and survival were sufficient.

=== Annual wolf status since reintroduction ===
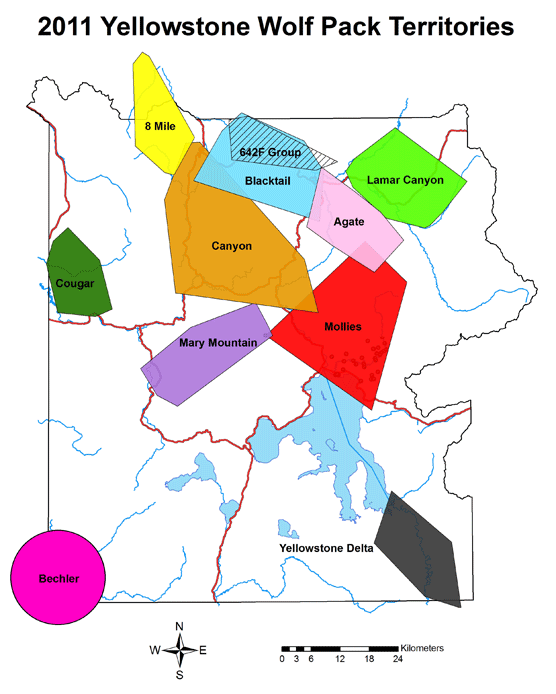
Yellowstone wolf pack territories in 2011

Wolf population declines, when they occur, result from "intraspecific strife," food stress, mange, canine distemper, legal hunting of wolves in areas outside the park (for sport or for livestock protection) and in one case in 2009, lethal removal by park officials of a human-habituated wolf.

*1995-99 Data reflects status of the wolf in the Greater Yellowstone Ecosystem. Since 2000 monitoring has focused on packs operating within park boundaries. Wolves continue to spread to surrounding areas, and the last official report by the park for the Greater Yellowstone Area counted 272 wolves in 2002.

Annual status of Wolves in Yellowstone (as of December)
Year	Total number of packs	Total number of wolves	Number of pups surviving
1995*	3	21	9
1996*	9	51	14
1997*	9	86	49
1998*	11	112	36
1999*	11	118	38
2000	8	119	55-60
2001	10	132	43
2002	14	148	58
2003	13–14	174	59
2004	16	171	59
2005	13	118	22
2006	13	136	60
2007	11	171	64
2008	12	124	22
2009	14	96	23
2010	11	97	38
2011	10	98	34
2012	10	83	20
2013	10	95	41
2014	11	104	40
2015	10	98	35
2016	11	108	36
2017	11	97	21
2018	9	80	24
2019	8	94	42
2020	9	123	54
2021	8	97	47
2022	10	108	40
2023	11	124	46

=== Ecological impacts after re-introduction ===
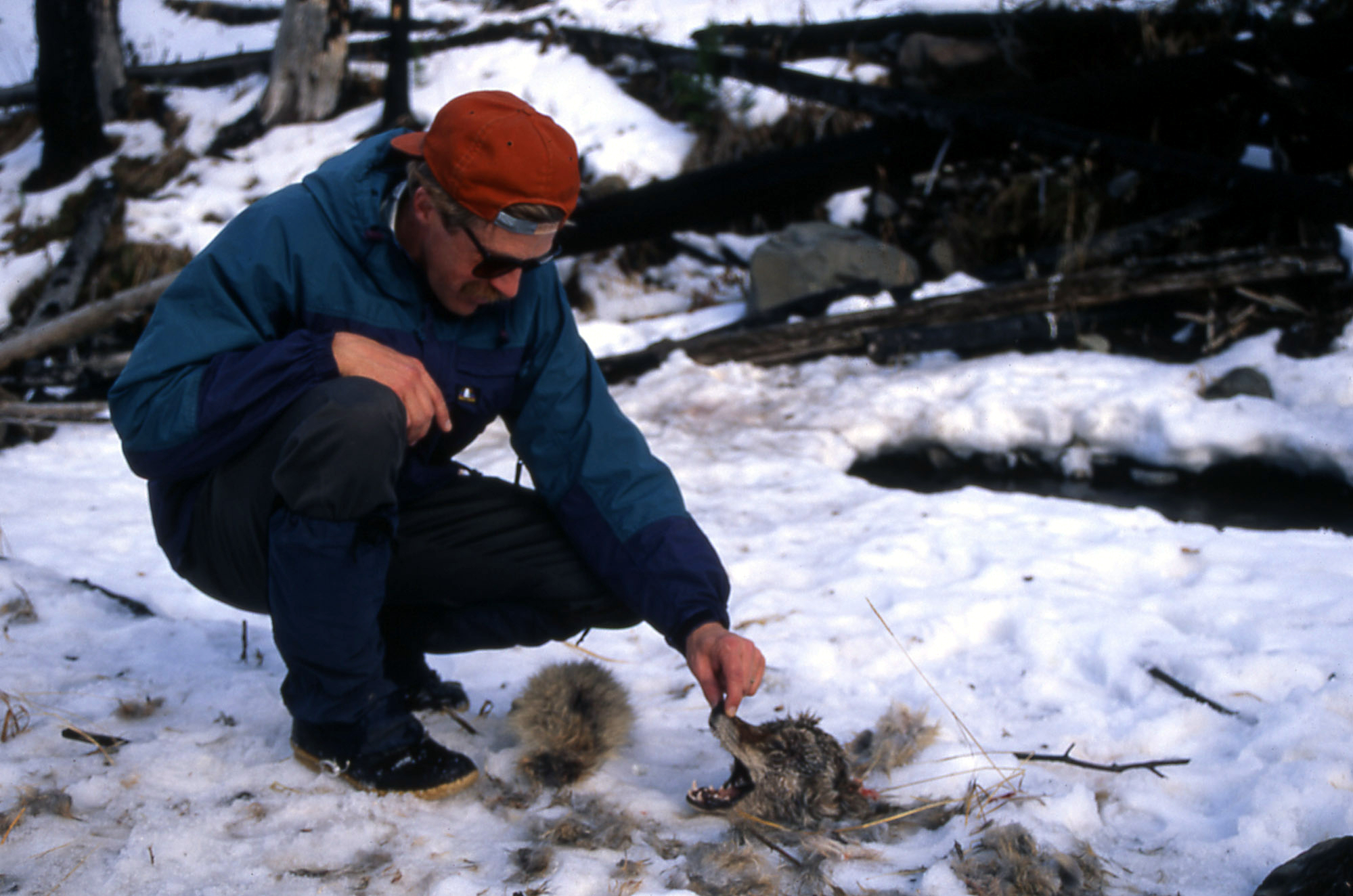
Rolf Peterson investigating the carcass of a coyote killed by a wolf in Yellowstone National Park, January 1996

Scientists have been researching and studying the impacts on the Yellowstone ecosystem since re-introduction in 1995.

As the wolf population in the park has grown, the elk population, their favored prey, has declined. Prior to reintroduction, the EIS predicted that wolves would kill an average 12 elk per wolf annually. This estimate proved too low as wolves are now killing an average of 22 elk per wolf annually. This decline in elk has resulted in changes in flora, most specifically willows, cottonwoods and aspens along the fringes of heavily timbered areas. Although wolf kills are directly attributable to declines in elk numbers, some research has shown that elk behavior has been significantly altered by wolf predation. The constant presence of wolves have pushed elk into less favorable habitats, raised their stress level, lowered their nutrition and their overall birth rate.

The wolves became significant predators of coyotes after their reintroduction. Since then, in 1995 and 1996, the local coyote population went through a dramatic restructuring. Until the wolves returned, Yellowstone National Park had one of the densest and most stable coyote populations in America due to a lack of human impacts. Two years after the wolf reintroductions, the pre-wolf population of coyotes had been reduced to 50% through both competitive exclusion and intraguild predation. Coyote numbers were 39% lower in the areas of Yellowstone where wolves were reintroduced. In one study, about 16% of radio-collared coyotes were preyed upon by wolves. Yellowstone coyotes have had to shift their territories as a result, moving from open meadows to steep terrain. Carcasses in the open no longer attract coyotes; when a coyote is chased on flat terrain, it is often killed. They feel more secure on steep terrain where they will often lead a pursuing wolf downhill. As the wolf comes after it, the coyote will turn around and run uphill. Wolves, being heavier, cannot stop and the coyote gains a large lead. Though physical confrontations between the two species are usually dominated by the larger wolves, coyotes have been known to attack wolves if they outnumber them. Both species will kill each other's pups given the opportunity.

Coyotes, in their turn, naturally suppress foxes, so the diminished coyote population has led to a rise in foxes, and "That in turn shifts the odds of survival for coyote prey such as hares and young deer, as well as for the small rodents and ground-nesting birds the foxes stalk. These changes affect how often certain roots, buds, seeds and insects get eaten, which alters the balance of local plant communities, and so on down the food chain all the way to fungi and microbes."

The presence of wolves has also coincided with a dramatic rise in the park's beaver population; where there was just one beaver colony in Yellowstone in 2001, there were nine beaver colonies in the park by 2011. The presence of wolves seems to have encouraged elk to browse more widely, diminishing their pressure on stands of willow, a plant that beavers need to survive the winter. The renewed presence of beavers in the ecosystem has substantial effects on the local watershed because the existence of beaver dams "even[s] out the seasonal pulses of runoff; store[s] water for recharging the water table; and provide[s] cold, shaded water for fish." Beaver dams also counter erosion and create "new pond and marsh habitats for moose, otters, mink, wading birds, waterfowl, fish, amphibians and more."

Similarly, after the wolves' reintroduction, their increased predation of elk benefited Yellowstone's grizzly bear population, as it led to a significant increase in the growth of berries in the national park, an important food source for the grizzly bears.

Wolf kills are scavenged by and thus feed a wide array of animals, including, but not limited to, ravens, wolverines, bald eagles, golden eagles, grizzly bears, black bears, jays, magpies, martens and coyotes.

Meanwhile, wolf packs often claim kills made by cougars, which has driven that species back out of valley hunting grounds to their more traditional mountainside territory.

The top-down effect of the reintroduction of an apex predator like the wolf on other flora and fauna in an ecosystem is an example of a trophic cascade.

=== 2009 removal from Endangered Species List ===
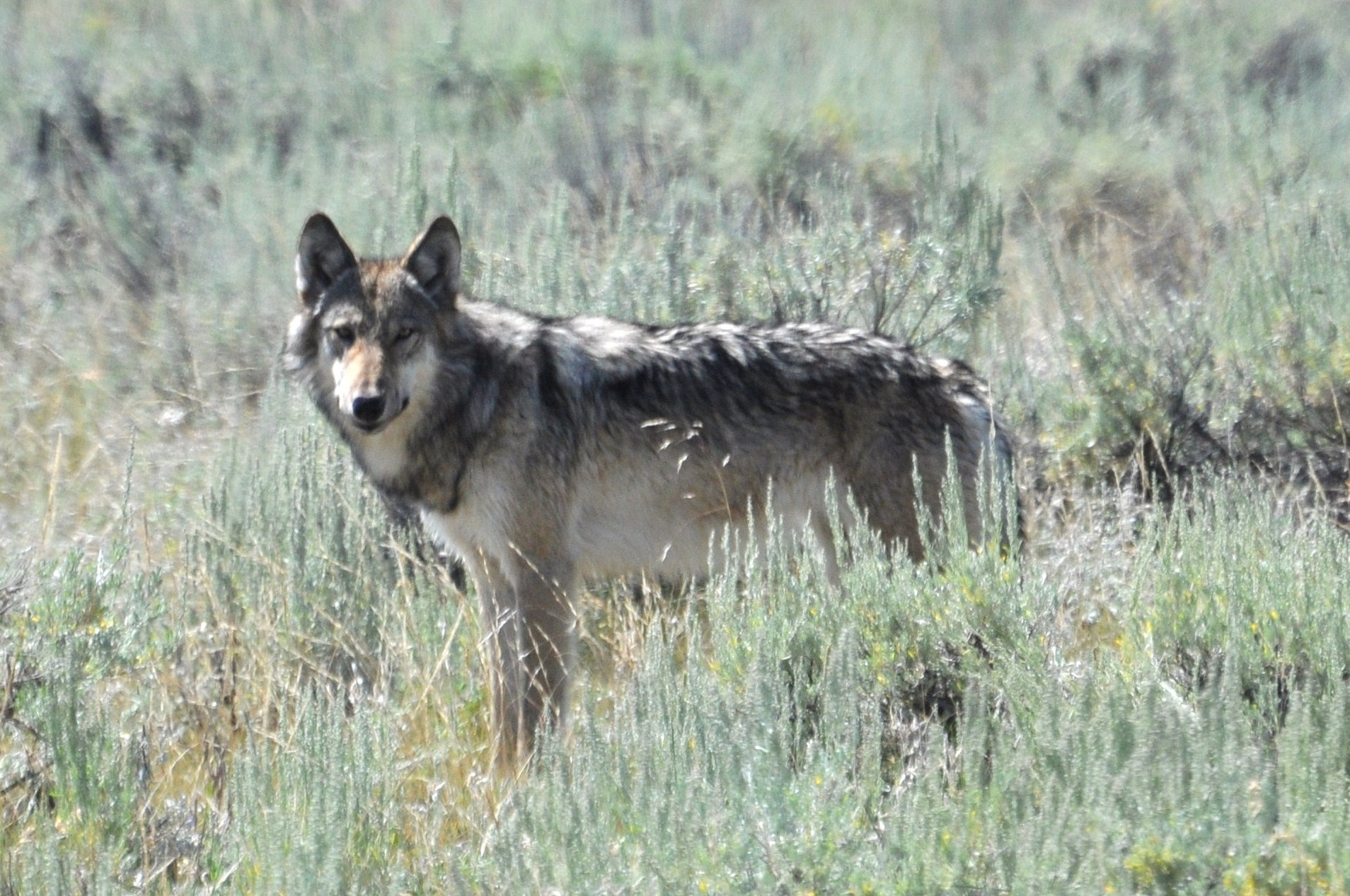
Wolf, Lamar Valley, 2011

Because gray wolf populations in Montana, Wyoming and Idaho had recovered sufficiently to meet the goals of the Wolf Recovery Plan, on May 4, 2008, the U.S. Fish and Wildlife Service changed the status of the gray wolf population known as the Northern Rocky Mountain Distinct Population Segment from Endangered to Experimental Population-Non Essential.

The wolves in Yellowstone and the Greater Yellowstone Ecosystem fall within this population. In response to the change in status, state wildlife authorities in Idaho and Montana enacted quota-based hunting seasons on wolves as part of their approved state Wolf Management Plans. Environmental groups objected to the delisting and the hunting seasons, but despite legal attempts to stop them (Defenders of Wildlife et al. v Ken Salazar et al.), the wolf hunts, which commenced in Montana in September 2009 were allowed to proceed.

Although wolves within the park boundaries were still fully protected, wolves that ventured outside the boundaries of the park in Idaho or Montana could now be legally hunted. During these hunts, Montana hunters legally killed a number of wolves in the Absaroka-Beartooth Wilderness known to frequent the northeast corner of the park.

== Reactions ==
=== Hunting opportunities ===
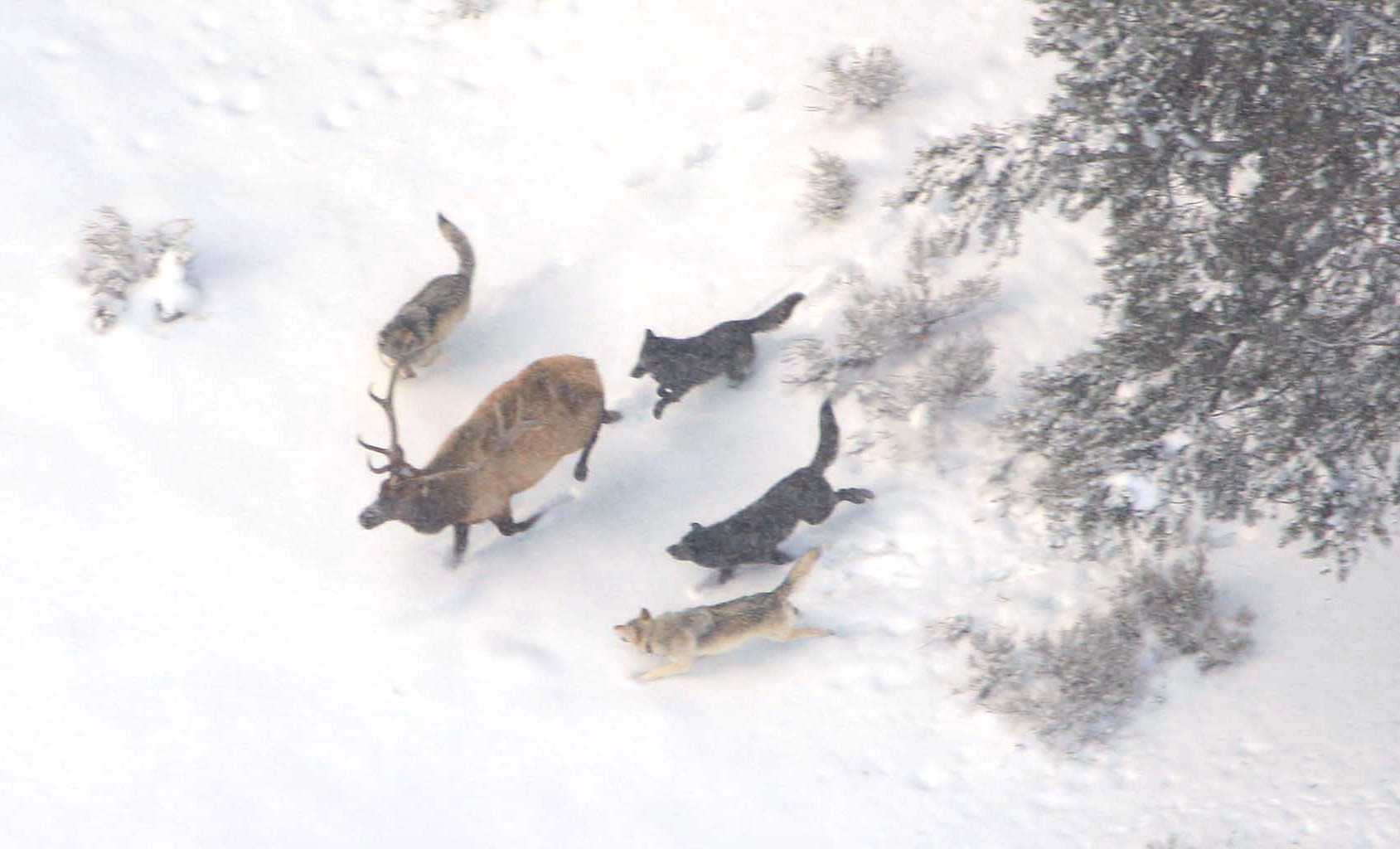
Yellowstone wolves chasing a bull elk

From 2000–2004, the Montana Fish, Wildlife and Parks reduced antlerless permits by 51% from 2,882 to 1,400. They proposed only 100 permits for 2006 which was a 96% decrease from the 2,660 permits issued in 1995. Initially, the effects of wolf predation on elk during the first five years of the recovery were not detected, as elk numbers were identical to those of 1980–1994. From the winter of 1995 to the winter of 2004 however, the elk greatly decreased in number, dropping from 16,791 to 8,335 as the number of wolves on the northern range increased from 21 to 106, though predation from bears, increased human harvests, more severe winter and droughts were also factors. Since 2000, 45% of known deaths and 75% of predation-caused deaths of radio collared cow-elk have been confirmed to be attributable to wolves. Human caused deaths in the same period accounted for 8–30% of known deaths. Yellowstone elk comprise up to 92% of the winter diet of wolves, the overall kill rates of Yellowstone wolves on elk in winter being estimated at 22 ungulates per wolf annually. This is higher than the 12 ungulates per wolf rate predicted in the ESA.

=== Subspecies ===
Historically, the wolf populations originally native to Yellowstone were classed under the subspecies C. l. irremotus. When the issue of what subspecies to use for the introduction was raised, U.S. Fish and Wildlife Service representatives stated that the taxonomy of gray wolves had been revised numerous times, and that C. l. irremotus was not a distinct subspecies, but a geographical variant. Three publications were made on the appropriateness of using a founding population of Canadian wolves: Brewster and Fritz supported the motion, while Nowak determined that the original Yellowstone wolves were more similar to C. l. nubilus, a subspecies already present in Minnesota, and that the Canadian animals proposed by Brewster and Fritz were of the subspecies C. l. occidentalis, a significantly larger animal. The rationale behind Brewster and Fritz's favor was that wolves show little genetic diversity, and that the original population was extinct anyway. This was contradicted by Nowak, who contested that Minnesotan wolves were much more similar in size and shape to the original population than the proposed Canadian wolves, though he conceded that C. l. occidentalis was probably already migrating southward even before human intervention. Doug Smith states that the size difference between the introduced wolves and the original wolves was actually only a 6-7 percent difference and Minnesotan wolves had no experience with elk and bison and were not adapted to mountainous terrain. Smith and Yellowstone National Park deny the claim that the "wrong wolf" was introduced.

== In popular culture ==
- The podcast Criminal covered the killing of Wolf 10 (a male) in their episode, "Wolf 10." Their sister podcast, This is Love, produced an episode about the reintroduction of wolves to Yellowstone, and focused on the stories of Wolves 8 (male), 21 (male), and 42 (female).
- The 2007 video game WolfQuest is largely based on the reintroduction of gray wolves in Yellowstone, featuring several real locations in-game and allowing the player to play as one of the five wolves who repopulated Yellowstone during reintroduction. Additionally, the player can choose to play as one of five real "famous wolves" of Yellowstone wolf-watchers, including The White Lady and 755M.

== See also ==
- O-Six, dominant breeding female ("alpha female") of the Lamar Canyon pack, whose death by hunting just outside Yellowstone received extensive media coverage and was the subject of a bestselling book by Nate Blakelee.
- OR-7, first confirmed wild wolf in western Oregon since 1947 and the first in California since 1924
- Repopulation of wolves in California began in 2011
- Repopulation of wolves in Colorado includes the natural expansion and proposed reintroduction
- Repopulation of wolves in the Midwestern states of Michigan, Minnesota, and Wisconsin occurred naturally
- List of gray wolf populations by country
- Wolf distribution (species distribution)
- Yellowstone (British TV series)
