= Repopulation of wolves in Midwestern United States =

Natural resettlement of wolves into Midwestern United States

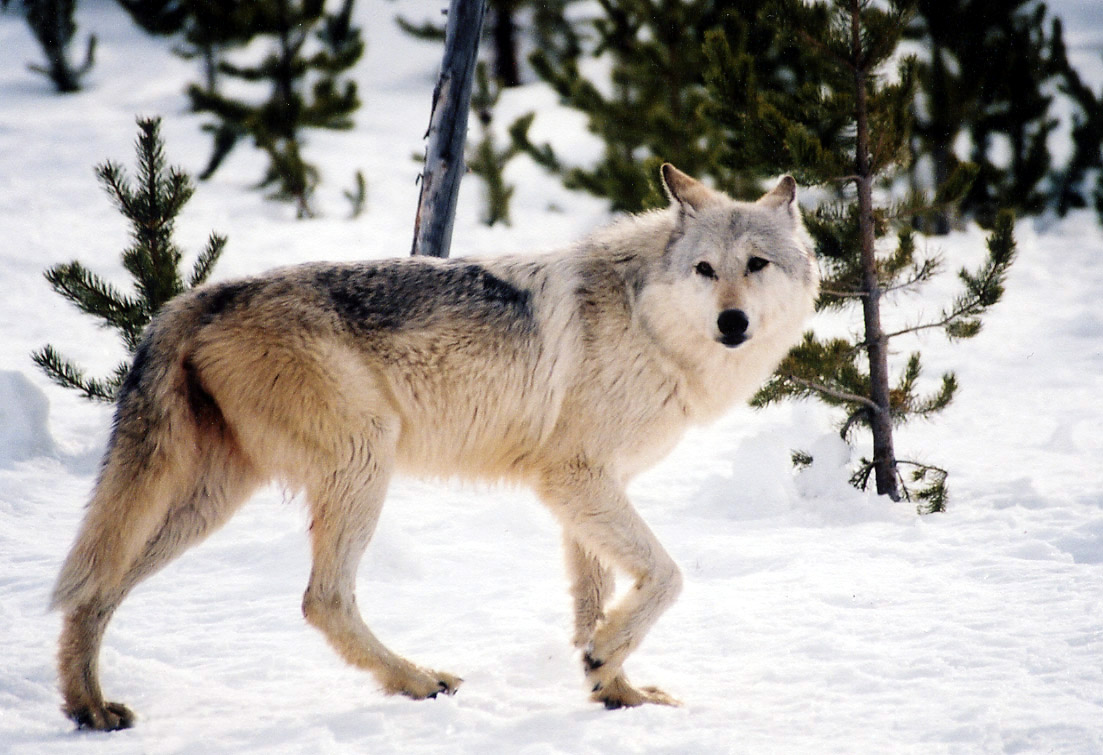
Gray wolf photographed by the USFWS Midwest Region.

Grey wolves were considered extirpated from the conterminous United States in the 1940s, but some survived in the remote northeastern corner of Minnesota. After they were listed as an endangered species, they naturally expanded into many of the habitats in the Midwestern states of Minnesota, Michigan, and Wisconsin they had previously occupied. These three states are estimated to have a stable population of 4,400 wolves. The western Great Lakes region they inhabit includes the forested areas of these states, along with the Canadian provinces of Manitoba and Ontario. In 1978, wolves were protected under the federal Endangered Species Act as it was determined that they were in danger of going extinct and needed protection to aid their recovery. Management under the Act allowed the remaining wolves in Minnesota to flourish and recolonize northern Wisconsin and the Upper Peninsula of Michigan. Wolves were removed from federal protection in January 2021 with management authority remaining with state and tribal authorities. Management plans guide each state's decisions about wolf regulations for hunting, trapping, and culling along with population monitoring, and livestock damage control. In February 2022, a judge ordered federal protections for gray wolves to be restored under the Federal Endangered Species Act which returned management authority to the U.S. Fish and Wildlife Service.

== Expansion under federal protection ==
Wild wolves became locally extinct from shooting, trapping, and poisoning, with support from government bounty programs. A bounty was put on wolves in 1865 in Wisconsin and they were thought to be completely eradicated from the state by 1960. In the 1960s and 1970s, national awareness of environmental issues and consequences led to the passage of laws designed to correct the mistakes of the past and help prevent similar mistakes in the future. While wolves were considered extirpated in every other state except for Alaska, they survived in a remote northeastern corner of Minnesota of sub-boreal forests and lakes. Wolves in the United States were protected under the federal Endangered Species Act in 1978 as they were in danger of going extinct and needed protection to aid their recovery. Known as Great Lakes-boreal wolves, the few hundred animals in dozens of packs remaining in Minnesota and Ontario began to naturally disperse through their historic habitat in the western Great Lakes forests under the protected status. Under protected status, wolves can only be killed when human life is at risk. Wolves in Minnesota were soon listed as threatened. This allowed limited, targeted trapping of wolves by the U.S. Department of Agriculture near where pets and livestock have been killed. That program has killed about 200 wolves each year while the endangered listing in Wisconsin and Michigan did not allow lethal control.

Wisconsin listed the gray wolf as a state endangered species in 1975 when it appeared that wolves, native to Wisconsin, were beginning to recolonize the state. The state issued its first Wolf Recovery Plan in 1985. Development continued to 1989, which set a population of 80 for three consecutive years as the trigger to reclassify the wolf to threatened status. Having reached that goal in 1999 with a population of 197, the state adopted the Wisconsin Wolf Management Plan for guidance towards eventual delisting. In 2003, the status of wolves in Wisconsin moved down to threatened rather than endangered. The known population in 2004 was 335 which included 8 on Indian reservations. The state plan was updated in 2007 when there were about 550 wolves in Wisconsin. Michigan Department of Natural Resources's principal goals set in 2008 include maintaining a viable wolf population, facilitating wolf-related benefits, minimizing wolf-related conflicts and conducting "science-based and socially acceptable management of wolves". Michigan removed wolves from the state's list of threatened and endangered species in 2009 having reached the recovery goal of 200 for five consecutive years in 2004. In 2012, FWS issued a rule that classified and delisted a sub-species called the Western Great Lakes wolves under the federal Endangered Species Act. In response, Wisconsin enacted a law requiring a hunting season while the wolf population had reached 800. Minnesota and Wisconsin held wolf harvest seasons in 2012, 2013, and 2014. Michigan had a legal wolf hunt in 2013 only. Wolves were returned to the list of federally threatened species in December 2014 as a result of a court ruling that the U.S. Fish and Wildlife Service did not fully address the impact that the extraction would have on the remaining wolves in the country.

== Migration ==
Wolves have naturally migrated in the three state region. As of 2021, the estimated stable population is 4,400 in the three states. Wolves may also disperse across the Great Plains into this region from the northern Rocky Mountain region which includes Wyoming with approximately 300 wolves and Colorado with a small population. In Midwestern states without resident packs, state authorities may perform biological genetic testing to determine the origin of the wolf when coyote hunters or ranchers self-report suspected wolf killings. Since wolves were extirpated in Nebraska in the early 1900s, there has been three instance of confirmed wolf presence as of 2021. The first was in 2002 and all the dispersers have been from the Great Lakes region. There are four known cases of wolves being shot by coyote hunters in Iowa since 2014. Evidence shows that from one to five wolves pass through the state each year. A few gray wolves have also been reported in South Dakota on both sides of the Missouri River. A wolf with a mixture of Great Lakes, Northwest Territories, and eastern gray wolf strains was confirmed in New York in 2022.

== Removal of federal endangered species status ==
The U.S. Fish and Wildlife Service removed gray wolves' endangered species status at the beginning of January 2021 when more than 6,000 wolves were living in nine states. The USFWS determined that the wolves in a suitable position to be taken off of the list, writing " "We propose this action because the best available scientific and commercial information indicates that the currently listed entities do not meet the definitions of a threatened species or endangered species under the Act due to recovery". The delisting was challenged in federal court by wildlife advocates in response to aggressive hunting laws enacted in states like Montana and Idaho. Officials in those states were responding to periodic attacks on livestock and perceived reduced numbers of elk and deer that many hunters blame on the wolves. At the November 2021 hearing, a federal judge focused on a particular issue; Were wolves properly classified under the endangered act prior to losing their protected status last year? The U.S. Fish & Wildlife Service is required to monitor for five years the population of any species it removes from the endangered species list. The post-delisting monitoring plan says wolves have to be doing well in Minnesota and Wisconsin for the species to continue to be delisted.

== State and tribal management ==
After federal wolf protection ended, the states and tribes again became responsible to manage the animal and regulate hunting. Wildlife management attempts to balance the needs of wildlife with the needs of people using the best available science. Management plans can provide a framework to guide each state's decisions about wolf regulations for hunting, trapping, and culling along with population monitoring, management, damage control, education, research and other issues. Some state governments welcomed the delisting as they have long sought the ability to manage wolves including controlling their numbers through hunting and trapping. The delisting has been supported by the Department of Natural Resources of Michigan as wolves have met and exceeded the biological recovery goals that would necessitate protection.

=== Anishinaabe people and the grey wolf ===
According to Anishinaabe tradition, The Creator gave "Ma'iingan," (the wolf) to the First Man as a friend and companion. The wolf is a fundamental component of kinship and identity for Anishinaabe people. They view the wolf as a relative, a brother. The wolf is ingrained in the Anishinaabe people's soul and identity through legends, clan membership, and culture (other Indigenous Nations have their own, and sometimes different relationship with the wolf). The wolf is not only a relative for the Anishinaabe people, but a being whose fate is intertwined with that of the Anishinaabe. Due to treaty rights, there was a tribal and state agreement made in 2011 that any wolf-related committee established by the state must include tribal members Anishinaabe people hold the strong belief that their treaty rights extend to their right to protect wolves in the region. In February 2021, when federal protection of wolves was removed, insufficient measures remained in place to preserve wolf populations in the midwest, resulting in the hunting of large numbers of wolves. Not only was this damaging to Anishinaabe cultural and spiritual values, but threatened resources that tribes were dependent on.

=== Minnesota ===
Minnesota has one of the densest wolf populations in the lower 48 states. By September 2018, the state had exceeded 2,000 wolves for at least 20 years when the midwinter survey put the population at 2,655 wolves with 465 packs. with the last management plan in Minnesota having been produced in 2001, Minnesota convened a technical committee in 2020 as they began the update to ensure the long-term survival of wolves in Minnesota while addressing wolf-human conflicts. The Minnesota Department of Natural Resources decided there would be no hunting or trapping season in 2021 while the management plan was being updated . A draft update was released in June 2022. Minnesota divided the state into two zones. The northeast zone would have more protections for the wolves than the rest of the state which would have more flexibility to manage the population.

=== Michigan ===
In 2023, Michigan had an estimated 630 wolves, all in the Upper Peninsula. Spread among 143 packs, that figure had been holding steady for several years. The wolves on Isle Royale, Michigan, in Lake Superior are considered separately and are not included in the count for the state. The Michigan DNR Wolf Management Advisory Council began meeting in August 2021 and plans to provide input on a management plan in May 2022. Native American tribes will also be consulted on wolf management. The management plan was last updated in 2015 and a date for renewed hunting has not been set although the state legislature urged them to have one soon.

=== Wisconsin ===
Wisconsin counted over 1,000 wolves with 256 packs in 2020. With the increasing population and improved understanding of population dynamics, an update to the Wisconsin wolf management plan process was initiated in 2021. The Wisconsin Department of Natural Resources (WDNR) is required by state law to set a wolf hunt season to be held between November and February if the animals are not listed as endangered (federal or state). They set the initial hunt for November 2021 which would have allowed time to assess the wolf population, receive public input, consult with the Native American tribes and prepare a plan. Also pups born in the spring would have a chance to grow. After an informational committee meeting on January 13, 2021, twelve elected officials sent a letter to the Natural Resources Board stating that the consensus was that wolves in Wisconsin need to be hunted now. Legislators were concerned that they might be quickly put back on the federal endangered species list through a legal challenge. A court ordered season did open at the end of February after the November date was challenged by an out-of-state hunter advocacy group. The hunt, hastily organized on two weeks' notice, was based on the state law requiring a season when wolves were not listed. Based on an estimated population of about 1,000 wolves, the department set the quota at 200 outside of reservation lands. Of these, 119 wolves were allocated to the state and 81 were allocated to the Ojibwe tribes since treaty rights are taken into consideration within the Ceded Territory, essentially the northern one-third of Wisconsin. The tribes consider the wolf culturally and spiritually important and place a high value on the ecological role of the species. They choose to not issue licenses for their allotted quota of recreational hunting. Tribes are generally open to responsible killing when wolves threaten domesticated animals. The season ended prematurely on February 23 after four days with hunters with state licenses killing 216 wolves. As the quota was clearly being exceeded, the closure still had to wait for 24 hours after the notice before closing a wolf hunting zone. Dogs were used in 86% of the wolves kills under conditions the WDNR described as ideal for tracking as wolf packs were breeding and leaving scent and tracks as they patrolled their territories. The law's 24-hour notice requirement prior to closing the season, the high number of licenses sold and the use of hunting hounds made it difficult to properly manage the hunt according to the WDNR. Researchers estimate that nearly one third of the state's total wolf population was reduced. They included estimated natural deaths and unreported kills such as poaching which they think increased after wolves were delisted. A WDNR official noted that the one third estimate did not account for any births that followed the spring hunt. The WDNR considered the 200 a conservative number in keeping with their intent to keep the population level stable. Wolves reproduce only once a year, usually between January and March. Scientists say that the 38 breeding-age females killed likely included those that were pregnant or nursing.

In response to the February hunt in Wisconsin, the Great Lakes Indian Fish & Wildlife Commission, a treaty rights group representing 11 Ojibwe tribes in Wisconsin, Minnesota and Michigan, sent a letter requesting that the U.S. Fish & Wildlife Service reconsider the decision to delist wolves. They also opposed the second 2021 Wisconsin hunt that was scheduled for November 6. They thought the "modest population" should be given time to recover from the "brutal hunt in February during the wolves' breeding season". The WDNR scientists proposed a 130-wolf limit for the fall season. The National Resources Board (NRB), which is the policy-setting board for the WDNR, approved a quota of up to 300 wolves. Scientists recommended a lower number as the swift removal of wolves from the state twice in one year would likely harm their natural reproduction process. The Ojibwe tribes seek to protect the wolves and contend that the NRB has willfully acted to nullify the Ojibwe Tribes' share by approving the higher quota. Six Ojibwe tribes filed a lawsuit in federal court in September saying that in setting the quota the NRB purposefully and knowingly discriminated against the Ojibwe Tribes by acting to nullify their share and that the board failed to use sound biological principles in establishing the quota. The WDNR went with their original 130-wolf limit determination. Ojibwe tribes claimed 56 of the quota in the Ceded Territory for the fall 2021 season. Non-tribal hunters were allocated 74 wolves total amongst the six zones within the state. A temporary injunction, issued on October 22 in a legal challenge brought by coalition of wildlife advocacy groups, halted the season two weeks before it was set to begin. The Dane County Circuit Court judge stated that the WDNR had failed to create permanent regulations enacting the law which created the hunting season. While the law is constitutional on its face, the department must follow the regulatory process. The WDNR must implement updated regulations on determining quotas and the number of licenses it issues and complete the ongoing update to the wolf management plan with new wolf population goals in order for the injunction to be lifted. The six Ojibwe tribes, that had filed a lawsuit in September, requested and failed to get the federal judge to issue a preliminary injunction to prevent the state from holding a hunt in the event the temporary injunction is overturned on appeal.

=== Return of federal protection ===
In February 2022, a judge has ordered federal protections for gray wolves to be restored under the Federal Endangered Species Act. The state of Wisconsin announced that the state is no longer allowed to have a wolf-hunting season. Permits that had been issued to landowners experiencing wolf conflicts were no longer valid for the lethal removal of wolves. The WDNR in 2022 conducted a social science survey of public attitudes toward wolves in Wisconsin as part of the update of the wolf management plan. A draft plan was released in November 2022 for public comments. The setting of a hard population limit was important for some legislators and members of the public. The new management plan was approved in October 2023 without a population goal. With a recommended statewide population of about 1,000 wolves, the plan instead outlines a process called adaptive management that focuses on ensuring there is a healthy population while also being responsive when conflicts arise.

== Research and the role of wolves in ecosystems ==
The presence of wolves was found to reduce deer-vehicle collisions in a study published in 2021. The two factors were the thinning of the deer population by wolves and behavior changes in fearful deer who avoided roads that wolves may be using.

Wolves are apex predators. With their place at the top of the food chain, they are connected to larger ecological processes. Wolves allow certain forests to remain undisturbed by beavers through their presence and predation. A study published in 2023 found that beavers were more likely to be killed by wolves the farther they ventured away from ponds in search of food. This limited the extent of the conifer zone around ponds where deciduous trees—beavers' preferred food—had been mostly removed.

== See also ==
- History of wolves in Yellowstone
- Repopulation of wolves in California
- Repopulation of wolves in Colorado
- Environmental issues in Wyoming § Gray wolf
- List of gray wolf populations by country
