= Wolf distribution =

Species distribution of Canis lupus

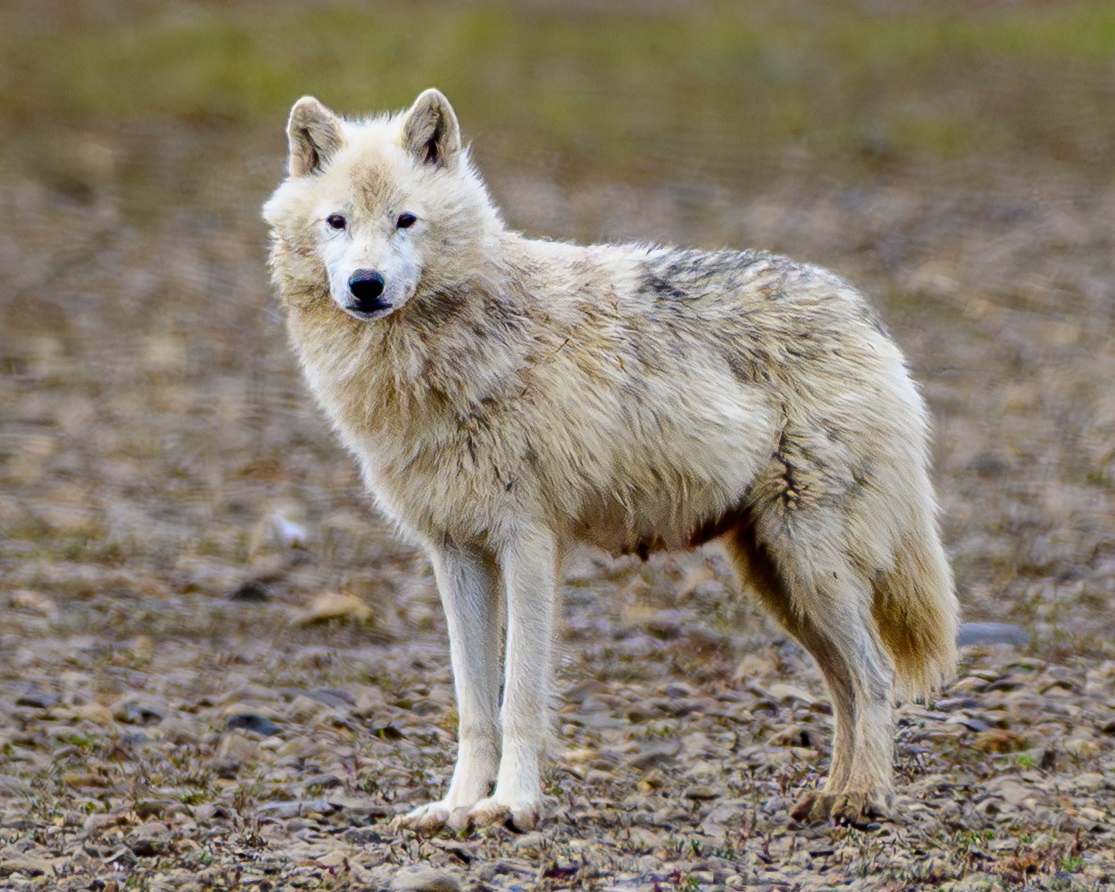
Arctic wolf, one of the northernmost occurring populations of wolves

Wolf distribution is the species distribution of the wolf (Canis lupus). Originally, wolves occurred in Eurasia above the 12th parallel north and in North America above the 15th parallel north. However, deliberate human persecution has reduced the species' range to about one-third, because of livestock predation and fear of wolf attacks on humans. The species is now extirpated in much of Western Europe, Mexico, and the contiguous United States, and completely from the British Isles and the Japanese archipelago. In modern history, the gray wolf occurs mostly in wilderness and remote areas, particularly in Canada, Alaska, the Northern United States, Europe and Asia from about the 75th parallel north to the 12th parallel north. Wolf population declines have been arrested since the 1970s, and have fostered recolonization and reintroduction in parts of its former range, due to legal protection, changes in land-use and rural human population shifts to cities. Competition with humans for livestock and game species, concerns over the danger posed by wolves to people, and habitat fragmentation pose a continued threat to the species. Despite these threats, because of the gray wolf's relatively widespread range and stable population, it is classified as Least Concern on the IUCN Red List. In Africa the population of wolves is limited to the northern regions with the African golden wolf (Canis lupaster) north of the Sahara and the Ethiopian wolf (Canis simensis) in Ethiopia.

== Europe ==
=== Decline ===
Wolf populations strongly declined across Europe during the 18th and 19th centuries largely due to human persecution, and by the End of World War II in Europe they had been extirpated from all of Central Europe and almost all of Northern Europe.

The extirpation of Northern Europe's wolves first became an organized effort during the Middle Ages, and continued until the late 19th century. In England, wolf eradication was enforced by legislation, and the last wolf was killed in the early 16th century during the reign of Henry VII (reigned 1485–1509). Wolves lasted longer in Scotland, where they sheltered in vast tracts of forest, which were subsequently burned down. Wolves managed to survive in the forests of Braemar and Sutherland until 1684. The extirpation of wolves in Ireland followed a similar course, with the last wolf believed to have been killed in 1786. A wolf bounty was introduced in Sweden in 1647, after the extirpation of moose and reindeer forced wolves to feed on livestock. The Sami extirpated wolves in northern Sweden in organized drives. By 1960, few wolves remained in Sweden, because of the use of snowmobiles in hunting them, with the last specimen being killed in 1966. The gray wolf was extirpated in Denmark in 1772 and Norway's last wolf was killed in 1973. The species was decimated in 20th century Finland, despite regular dispersals from Russia. The gray wolf was only present in the eastern and northern parts of Finland by 1900, though its numbers increased after World War II.

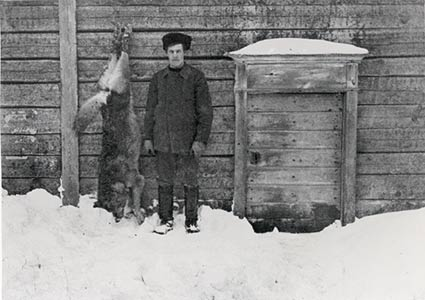
Last wolf to be killed in central Finland (Karstula, 1911)

In Central Europe, wolves were dramatically reduced in number during the early 19th century, because of organized hunts and reductions in ungulate populations. In Bavaria, the last wolf was killed in 1847, and had disappeared from the Rhine regions by 1899. In Switzerland, wolves were extirpated in the 20th century; they are naturally coming back from Italy since the 1990s. In 1934, Nazi Germany became the first state in modern history to place the wolf under protection, though the species was already extirpated in Germany at this point. The last free-living wolf to be killed on the soil of present-day Germany before 1945 was the so-called "Tiger of Sabrodt", which was shot near Hoyerswerda, Lusatia (then Lower Silesia) in 1904. Today, wolves have returned to the area. Wolf hunting in France was first institutionalized by Charlemagne between 800 and 813, when he established the louveterie, a special corps of wolf hunters. The louveterie was abolished after the French Revolution in 1789, but was reestablished in 1814. In 1883, up to 1,386 wolves were killed, with many more by poison.

In Eastern Europe, some wolves remained because of the area's contiguity with Asia and its large forested areas. However, Eastern European wolf populations were reduced to very low numbers by the late 19th century. Wolves were extirpated in Slovakia during the first decade of the 20th century and, by the mid-20th century, could only be found in a few forested areas in eastern Poland. Wolves in the eastern Balkans benefitted from the region's contiguity with the former Soviet Union and large areas of plains, mountains and farmlands. Wolves in Hungary occurred in only half the country around the start of the 20th century, and were largely restricted to the Carpathian Basin. Wolf populations in Romania remained largely substantial, with an average of 2,800 wolves being killed annually out of a population of 4,600 from 1955 to 1965. An all-time low was reached in 1967, when the population was reduced to 1,550 animals. The extirpation of wolves in Bulgaria was relatively recent, as a previous population of about 1,000 animals in 1955 was reduced to about 100–200 in 1964. In Greece, the species disappeared from the southern Peloponnese in 1930. Despite periods of intense hunting during the 18th century, wolves never disappeared in the western Balkans, from Albania to the former Yugoslavia. Organized persecution of wolves began in Yugoslavia in 1923, with the setting up of the Wolf Extermination Committee (WEC) in Kočevje, Slovenia. The WEC was successful in reducing wolf numbers in the Dinaric Alps.

In Southern Europe, some wolves remained because of greater cultural tolerance of the species. Wolf populations only began declining in the Iberian Peninsula in the early 19th century, and was reduced by a half of its original size by 1900. Wolf bounties were regularly paid in Italy as late as 1950. Wolves were extirpated in the Alps by 1800, and numbered only 100 by 1973, inhabiting only 3–5% of their former Italian range.

=== Recovery ===
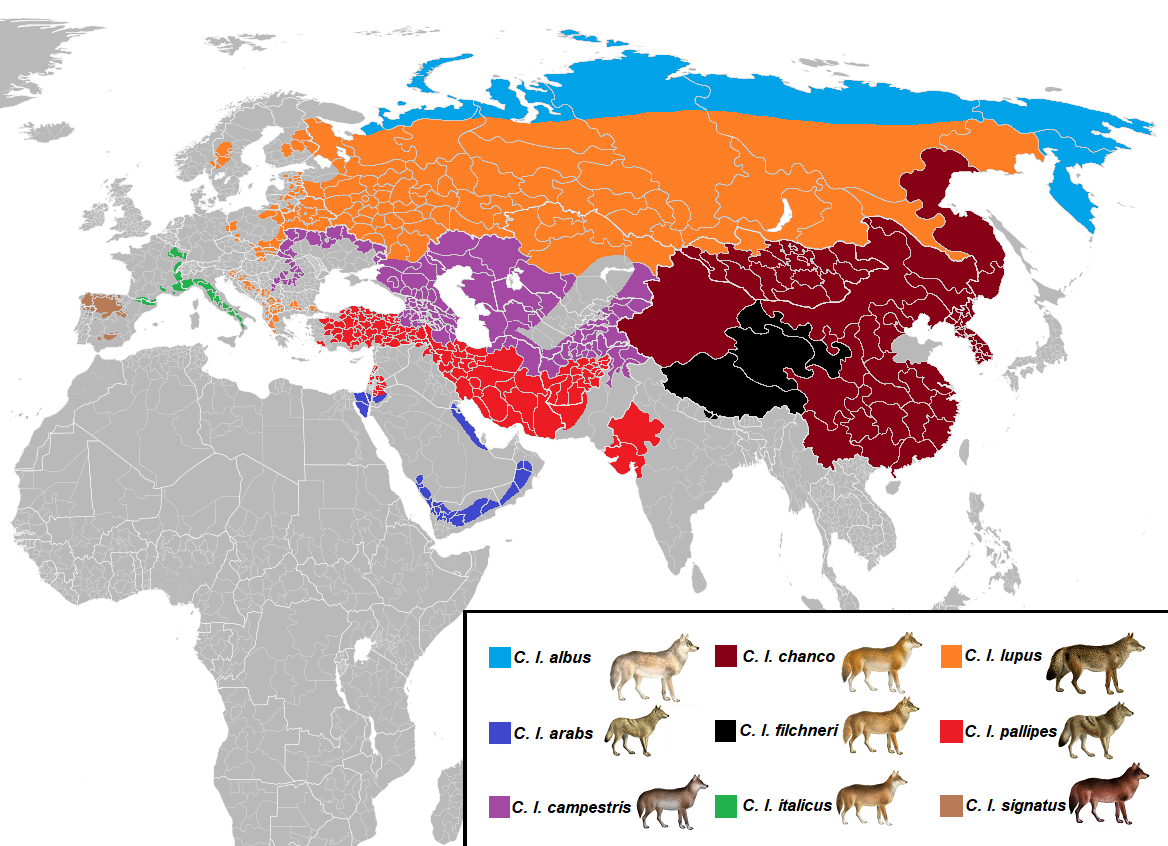
Outdated range of Canis lupus subspecies in Eurasia

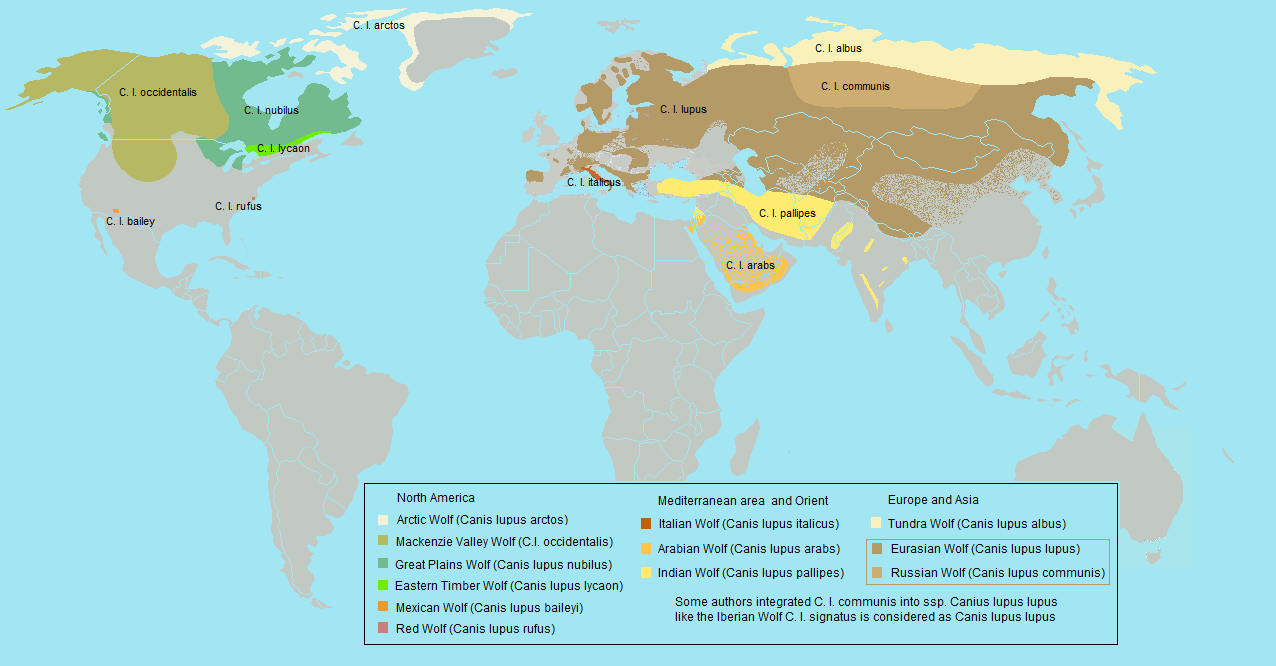
European authors use another taxonomy and names for the subspecies

The recovery of European wolf populations began after the 1950s, when traditional pastoral and rural economies declined and thus removed the need to heavily persecute wolves. By the 1980s, small and isolated wolf populations expanded in the wake of decreased human density in rural areas and the recovery of wild prey populations.

The gray wolf has been fully protected in Italy since 1976, and now holds a population of over 1,269–1,800. Italian wolves entered France's Mercantour National Park in 1993, and at least fifty wolves were discovered in the western Alps in 2000. By 2013 the 250 wolves in the Western Alps imposed a significant burden on traditional sheep and goat husbandry with a loss of over 5,000 animals in 2012. There are approximately 2,000 wolves inhabiting the Iberian Peninsula, of which 150 reside in northeastern Portugal. In Spain, the species occurs in Galicia, Leon, and Asturias. Although hundreds of Iberian wolves are illegally killed annually, the population has expanded south across the river Duero and east to the Asturias and Pyrenees Mountains.

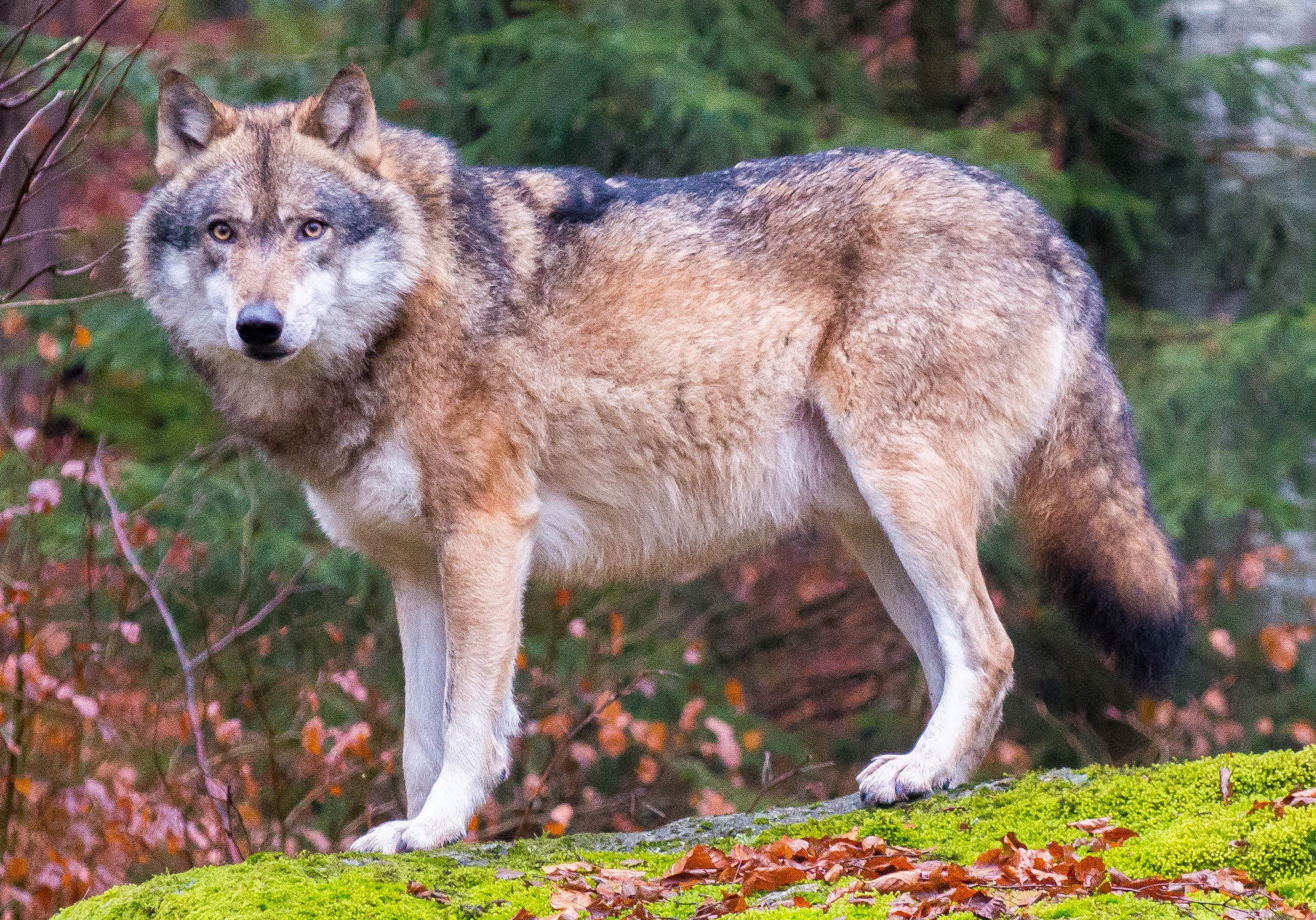
Eurasian wolf in Bavarian Forest National Park, Germany

In 1978, wolves began recolonising central Sweden after a 12-year absence, and have since expanded into southern Norway. As of 2020, the total number of Swedish and Norwegian wolves is estimated to be 450. The gray wolf is protected in Sweden but with a 12% annual rate of poaching, and partially controlled in Norway. The Scandinavian wolf populations owe their continued existence to neighbouring Finland's contiguity with the Republic of Karelia, which houses a large population of wolves. Wolves in Finland are protected only in the southern third of the country, and can be hunted in other areas during specific seasons, though poaching remains common, with 90% of young wolf deaths being due to human predation, and the number of wolves killed exceeds the number of hunting licenses, in some areas by a factor of two. Furthermore, the decline in the moose populations has reduced the wolf's food supply. Since 2011, the Netherlands, Belgium and Denmark have also reported wolf sightings presumably by natural migration from adjacent countries. In 2016, a female wolf tracked 550 kilometers from a region southwest of Berlin to settle in Jutland, Denmark where male wolves had been reported in 2012 for the first time in 200 years. Wolves have also commenced breeding in Lower Austria's Waldviertel region for the first time in over 130 years.

Wolf populations in Poland have increased to about 800–900 individuals since being classified as a game species in 1976. Poland plays a fundamental role in providing routes of expansion into neighbouring Central European countries. In the east, its range overlaps with populations in Lithuania, Belarus, Ukraine, and Slovakia. A population in western Poland expanded into eastern Germany and in 2000 the first pups were born on German territory. In 2012, an estimated 14 wolf packs were living in Germany (mostly in the east and north) and a pack with pups has been sighted within 15 miles of Berlin; the number increased to 46 packs in 2016. The gray wolf is protected in Slovakia, though an exception is made for wolves killing livestock. A few Slovak wolves disperse into the Czech Republic, where they are afforded full protection. Wolves in Slovakia, Ukraine and Croatia may disperse into Hungary, where the lack of cover hinders the buildup of an autonomous population. Although wolves have special status in Hungary, they may be hunted with a year-round permit if they cause problems.

Romania has a large population of wolves, numbering 2,500 animals. The wolf has been a protected animal in Romania since 1996, although the law is not enforced. The number of wolves in Albania and North Macedonia is largely unknown, despite the importance the two countries have in linking wolf populations from Greece to those of Bosnia and Herzegovina and Croatia. Although protected, sometimes wolves are still illegally killed in Greece, and their future is uncertain. Wolf numbers have declined in Bosnia and Herzegovina since 1986, while the species is fully protected in neighbouring Croatia and Slovenia.

Although wolf-dog hybridization in Europe has raised concern among conservation groups fearing for the gray wolf's purity, genetic tests show that introgression of dog genes into European gray wolf populations does not pose a significant threat. Also, as wolf and dog mating seasons do not fully coincide, the likelihood of wild wolves and dogs mating and producing surviving offspring is small.

== Asia ==
=== Historical range and decline ===
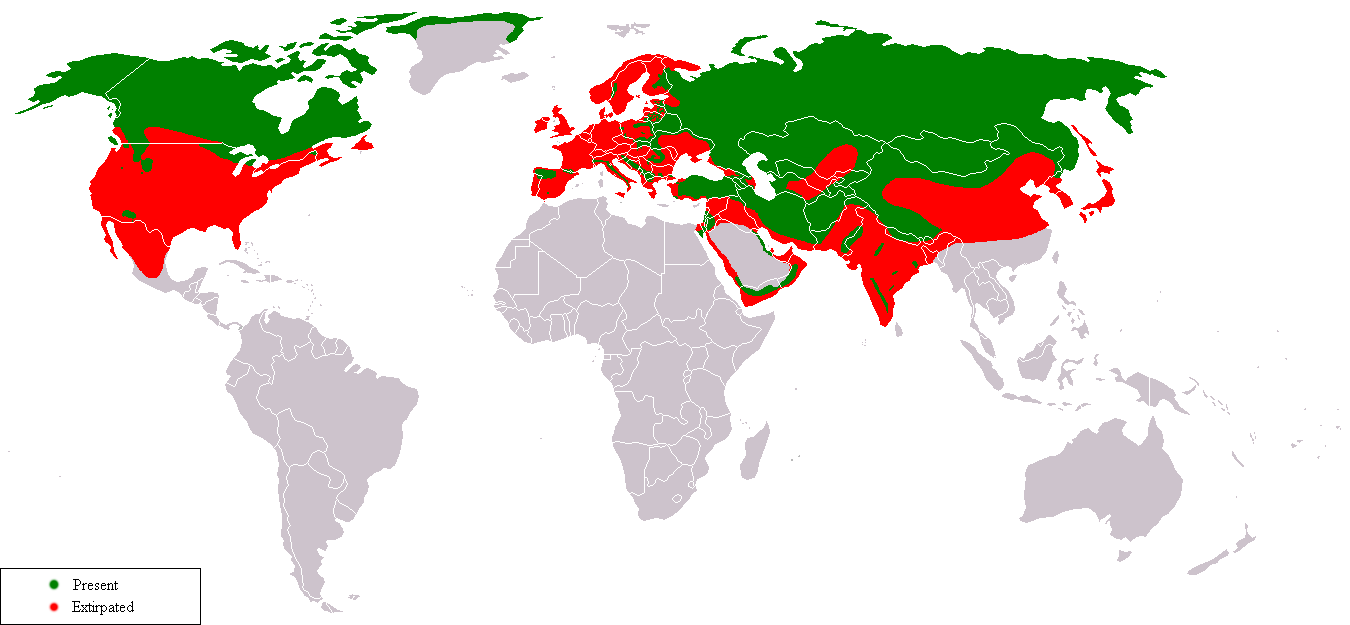
Past and modern range of Canis lupus

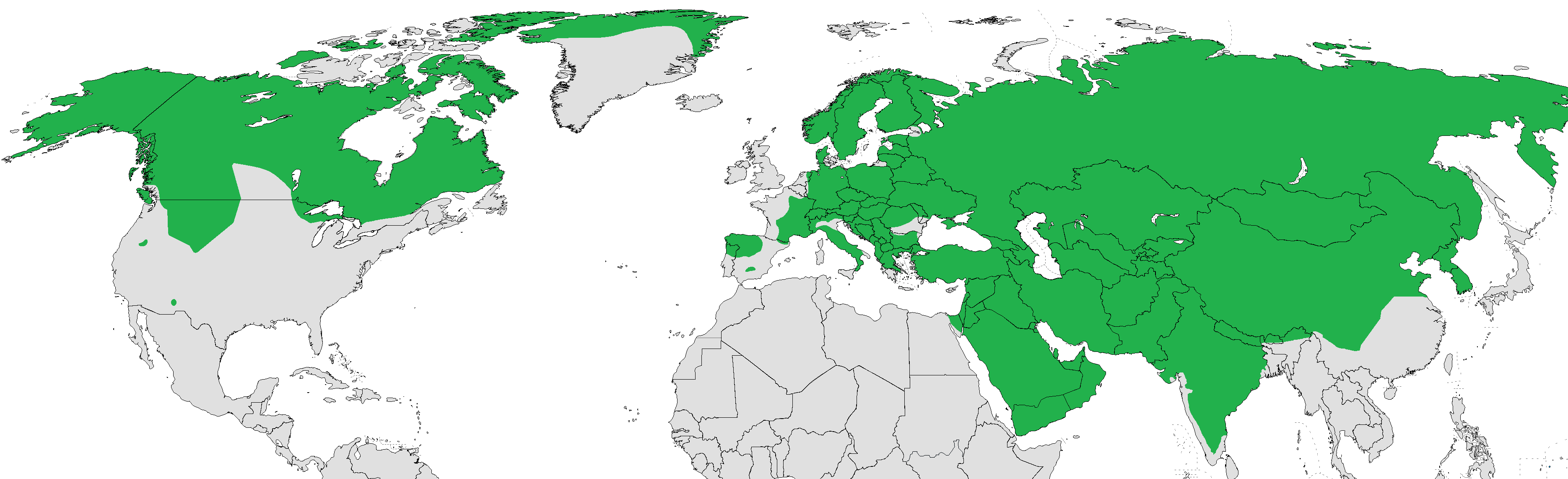
Present distribution of wolves (IUCN 2023)

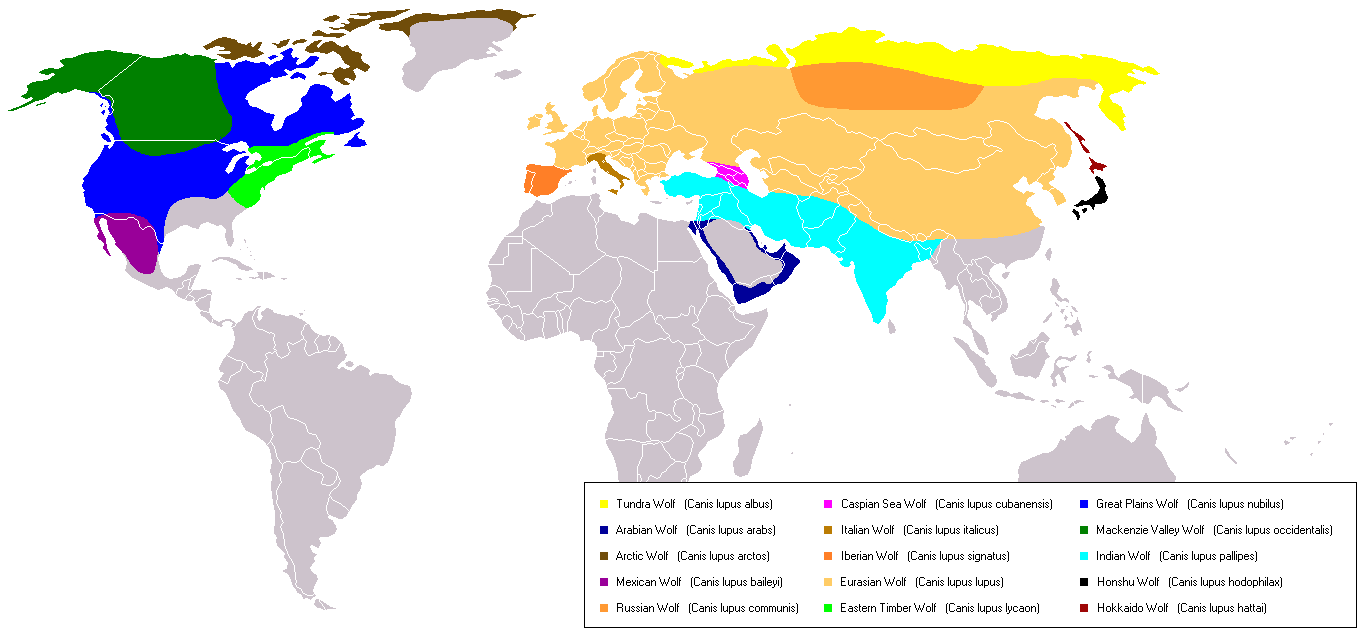
Present and historical range of wild subspecies of C. lupus

During the 19th century, gray wolves were widespread in many parts of the Holy Land east and west of the Jordan River. However, they decreased considerably in number between 1964 and 1980, largely because of persecution by farmers. The species was not considered common in northern and central Saudi Arabia during the 19th century, with most early publications citing sources which involved animals either from southwestern Asir, northern rocky areas bordering Jordan, or areas surrounding Riyadh.

The gray wolf's range in the Soviet Union encompassed nearly the entire territory of the country, being absent only on the Solovetsky Islands, Franz-Josef Land, Severnaya Zemlya, and the Karagin, Commander and Shantar Islands. The species was extirpated twice in Crimea, once after the Russian Civil War, and again after World War II. Following the two world wars the Soviet wolf populations peaked twice, with 30,000 wolves being harvested annually out of a population of 200,000 during the 1940s, and 40,000–50,000 harvested during peak years. Soviet wolf populations reached a low around 1970, disappearing over much of European Russia. The population increased again by 1980 to about 75,000, with 32,000 being killed in 1979. Wolf populations in northern Inner Mongolia declined during the 1940s, primarily because of poaching of gazelles, the wolf's main prey. In British-ruled India, wolves were heavily persecuted because of their attacks on sheep, goats and children. In 1876, 2,825 wolves were bountied in the North-Western Provinces (NWP) and Bihar. By the 1920s, wolf eradication remained a priority in the NWP and Awadh. Overall, over 100,000 wolves were killed for bounties in British India between 1871 and 1916.

Wolves in Japan were extirpated during the Meiji restoration period, in a campaign known as ōkami no kujo. The wolf was deemed a threat to ranching, which the Meiji government promoted at the time, and targeted via a bounty system and a direct chemical poisoning campaign inspired by the similar contemporary American campaign. The last Japanese wolf was a male killed on January 23, 1905, near Washikaguchi (now called Higashi Yoshiro). The now-extirpated Japanese wolves were descended from large Siberian wolves, which colonized the Korean Peninsula and Japan, before it separated from mainland Asia, 20,000 years ago during the Pleistocene. During the Holocene, the Tsugaru Strait widened and isolated Honshu from Hokkaido, thus causing climatic changes leading to the extinction of most large-bodied ungulates inhabiting the archipelago. Japanese wolves likely underwent a process of island dwarfism 7,000–13,000 years ago in response to these climatological and ecological pressures. C. l. hattai (formerly native to Hokkaidō) was significantly larger than its southern cousin C. l. hodophilax, as it inhabited higher elevations and had access to larger prey, as well as a continuing genetic interaction with dispersing wolves from Siberia.

Gray wolves had a wide historic range in China encompassing nearly all of mainland China, including southern China. A systematic review by Wang et al. in 2016, found museum specimens from wolves from across China, in 13 provinces, including several in southern China - two specimens sampled from two southern Chinese provinces (Zhejiang and Fujian) in 1974, and one from southern Yunnan in 1985. This study also reviewed more than 100 articles and found modern, recent records of gray wolves in every continental province of China between 1964 and the present except for three provinces - Tianjin, Jiangsu, and Fujian. Wolves were recorded in South China (in Yunnan province) as late as 2011, and in the two southernmost provinces (Guangdong and Guangxi) in the year of 2000. From these findings, the researchers concluded that wolves are still present across all parts of continental China.

=== Modern range ===
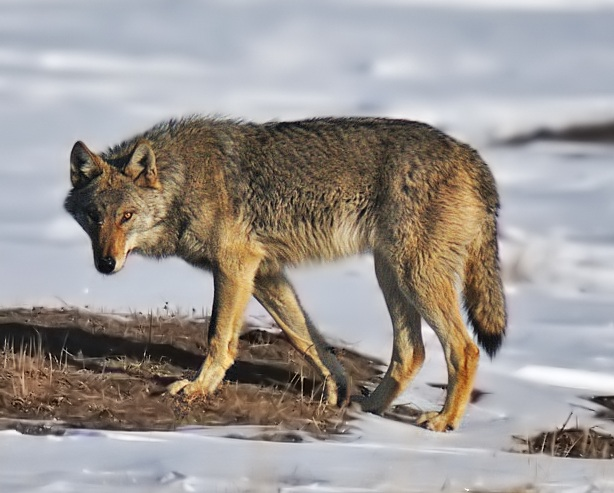
Steppe wolf near Ardahan, Turkey.

There is little reliable data on the status of wolves in the Middle East, save for those in Israel and Saudi Arabia, though their numbers appear to be stable, and are likely to remain so. Throughout the Middle East, the species is only protected in Israel. Israel has a stable population of 80-100 Indian wolves and 100-150 Arabian wolves, which are legally protected under the 1955 Wildlife Protection Law. Elsewhere, it can be hunted year-round by Bedouins. Israel's conservation policies and effective law enforcement maintain a moderately sized wolf population, which radiates into neighbouring countries, while Saudi Arabia has vast tracts of desert, where about 300–600 wolves live undisturbed. The wolf survives throughout most of its historical range in Saudi Arabia, probably because of a lack of pastoralism and abundant human waste. Turkey may play an important role in maintaining wolves in the region, because of its contiguity with Central Asia. Although Turkish wolves have no legal protection, they may number about 7,000 individuals. The mountains of Turkey have served as a refuge for the few wolves remaining in Syria. A small wolf population occurs in the Golan Heights, and is well protected by the military activities there. Wolves living in the southern Negev desert are contiguous with populations living in the Egyptian Sinai and Jordan.

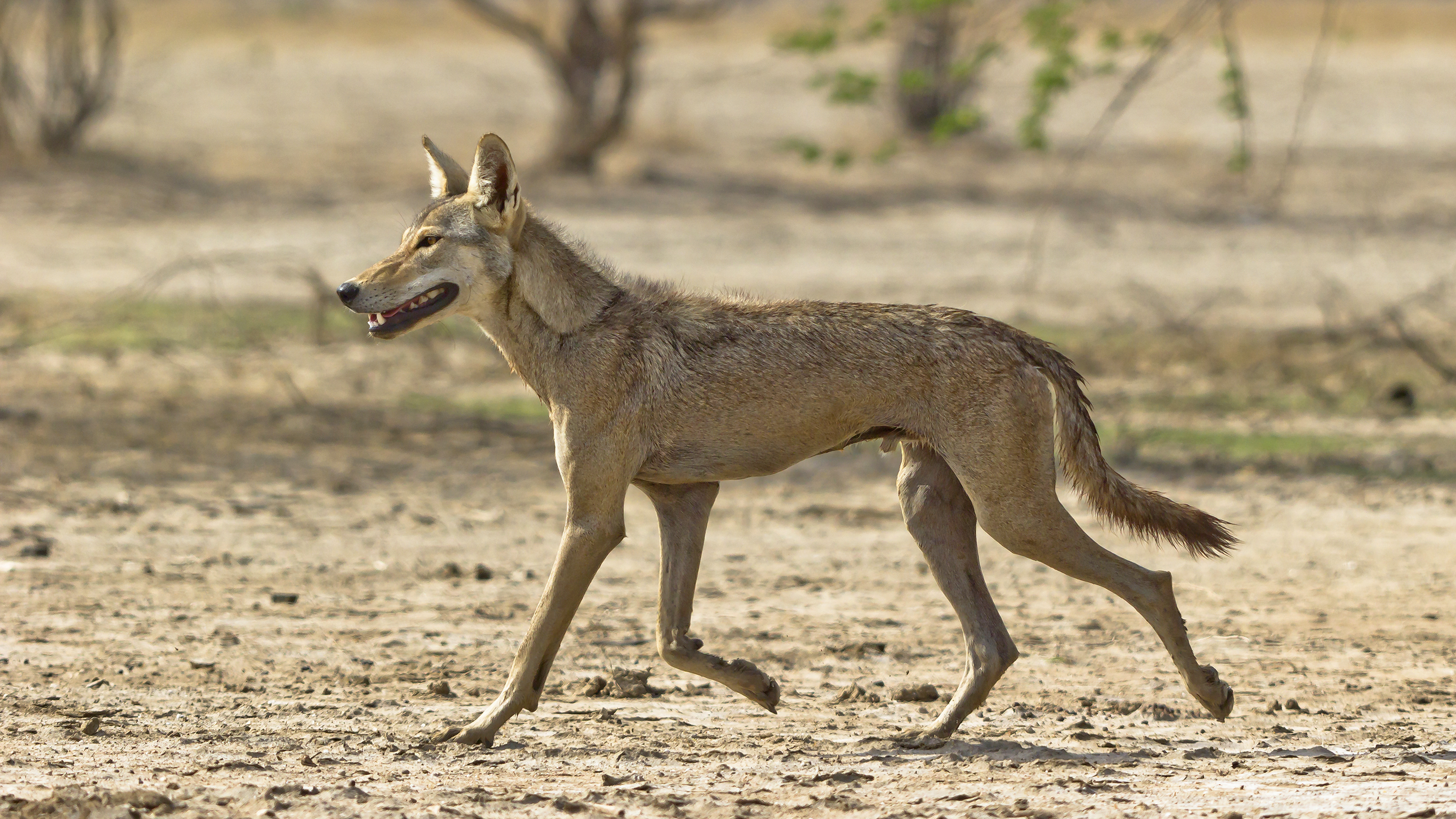
Indian wolf at Velavadar (Blackbuck National Park, Gujarat)

The northern regions of Afghanistan and Pakistan are important strongholds for the wolf. It has been estimated that there are about 300 wolves in approximately 60,000 km^{2} (23,000 sq mi) of Jammu and Kashmir in northern India, and 50 more in Himachal Pradesh. Overall, India supports about 800–3,000 wolves, scattered among several remnant populations. Although protected since 1972, Indian wolves are classed as endangered, with many populations lingering in low numbers or living in areas increasingly used by humans. Little is known of current wolf populations in Iran, which occurred throughout the country in low densities during the mid-1970s. Although present in Nepal and Bhutan, there is no information on wolves occurring there.

Wolf populations throughout Northern and Central Asia are largely unknown, but are estimated in the hundreds of thousands based on annual harvests. Since the fall of the Soviet Union, continent-wide culling of wolves has ceased, and wolf populations have increased to about 25,000–30,000 animals throughout the former Soviet Union. In China and Mongolia, wolves are only protected in reserves. Mongolian populations have been estimated at 10,000–30,000, while the status of wolves in China is more fragmentary. The north has a declining population of an estimated 400 wolves, while Xinjiang and Tibet hold about 10,000 and 2,000 respectively. In 2008, an authoritative reference stated that the gray wolf could be found across mainland China.

In 2017, a comprehensive study found that the gray wolf was present across all of mainland China, both in the past and today. It exists in southern China, which refutes claims made by some researchers in the Western world that the wolf had never existed in southern China. In 2019, a genomic study on the wolves of China included museum specimens of wolves from southern China that were collected between 1963 and 1988. The wolves in the study formed 3 clades: north Asian wolves that included those from northern China and eastern Russia, Himalayan wolves from the Tibetan Plateau, and a unique population from southern China. One specimen from Zhejiang province in eastern China shared gene flow with the wolves from southern China, however its genome was 12-14 percent admixed with a canid that may be the dhole or an unknown canid that predates the genetic divergence of the dhole. The wolf population from southern China is believed to be still existing in that region. On Hainan Island, historical records of gray wolves exist until 1931, where they are estimated to have become extinct around 1941.

== North America ==
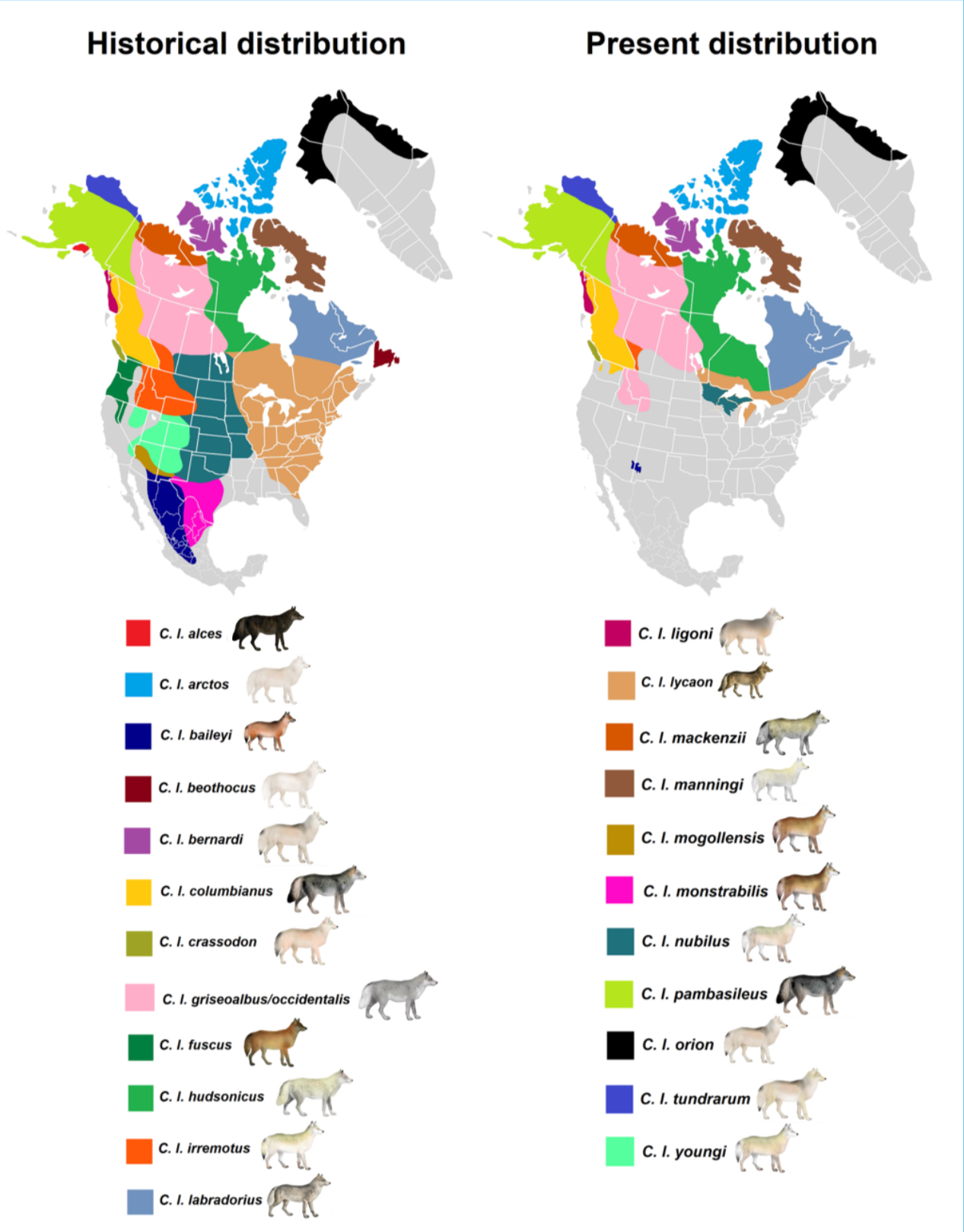
Historical and present range of gray wolf subspecies in North America

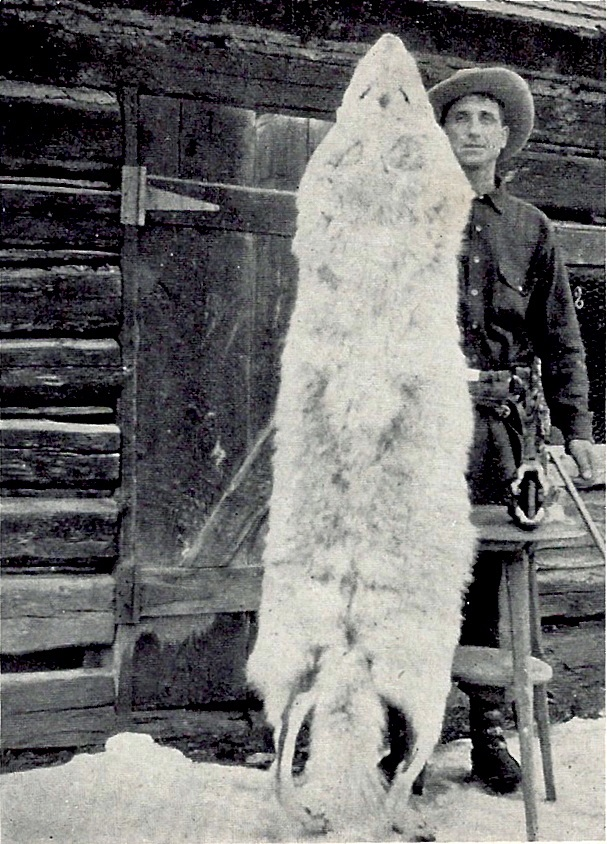
100 lb (45 kg) gray wolf killed in Montana, 1928. Before they were extirpated around 1930, Montana's wolves could be very large. Wolves recolonized the state from Canada beginning in the 1970s.

=== Historical range and decline ===
Originally, the gray wolf occupied all of North America north of about 20°N. It occurred all over the mainland, except for the southeastern United States and the tropical and subtropical areas of Mexico. Large continental islands occupied by wolves included Newfoundland, Vancouver Island, the southeastern Alaskan islands, and throughout the Arctic Archipelago and Greenland. While Lohr and Ballard postulated that the gray wolf had never been present on Prince Edward Island, analysis of references to the island's native fauna in unpublished and published historical records has found that gray wolves were resident there at the time of the first French settlement in 1720. In his November 6, 1721 letter to the French Minister of the Marine, Louis Denys de La Ronde reported that the island was home to wolves "of a prodigious size", and sent a wolf pelt back to France to substantiate his claim. As the island was cleared for settlement, the gray wolf population may have been extirpated, or relocated to the mainland across the winter ice: the few subsequent wolf reports date from the mid-19th century and describe the creatures as transient visitors from across the Northumberland Strait.

The decline of North American wolf populations coincided with increasing human populations and the expansion of agriculture. In Canada, the gray wolf was extirpated in New Brunswick and Nova Scotia between 1870 and 1921, and in Newfoundland around 1911. It vanished from the southern regions of Quebec and Ontario between 1850 and 1900. The gray wolf's decline in the prairies began with the extirpation of the American bison and other ungulates in the 1860s–70s. From 1900 to 1930, the gray wolf was virtually eliminated from the western U.S. and adjoining parts of Canada, because of intensive predator control programs aimed at eradicating the species. By the start of the 20th century, the species had almost disappeared from the eastern U.S., excepting some areas of the Appalachians and the northwestern Great Lakes Region. The gray wolf was extirpated by federal and state governments from all of the U.S. by 1960, except in Alaska and northern Minnesota. The decline in North American wolf populations was reversed from the 1930s to the early 1950s, particularly in southwestern Canada, because of expanding ungulate populations resulting from improved regulation of big game hunting. This increase triggered a resumption of wolf control in western and northern Canada. Thousands of wolves were killed from the early 1950s to the early 1960s, mostly by poisoning. This campaign was halted and wolf populations increased again by the mid-1970s.

=== Modern range ===
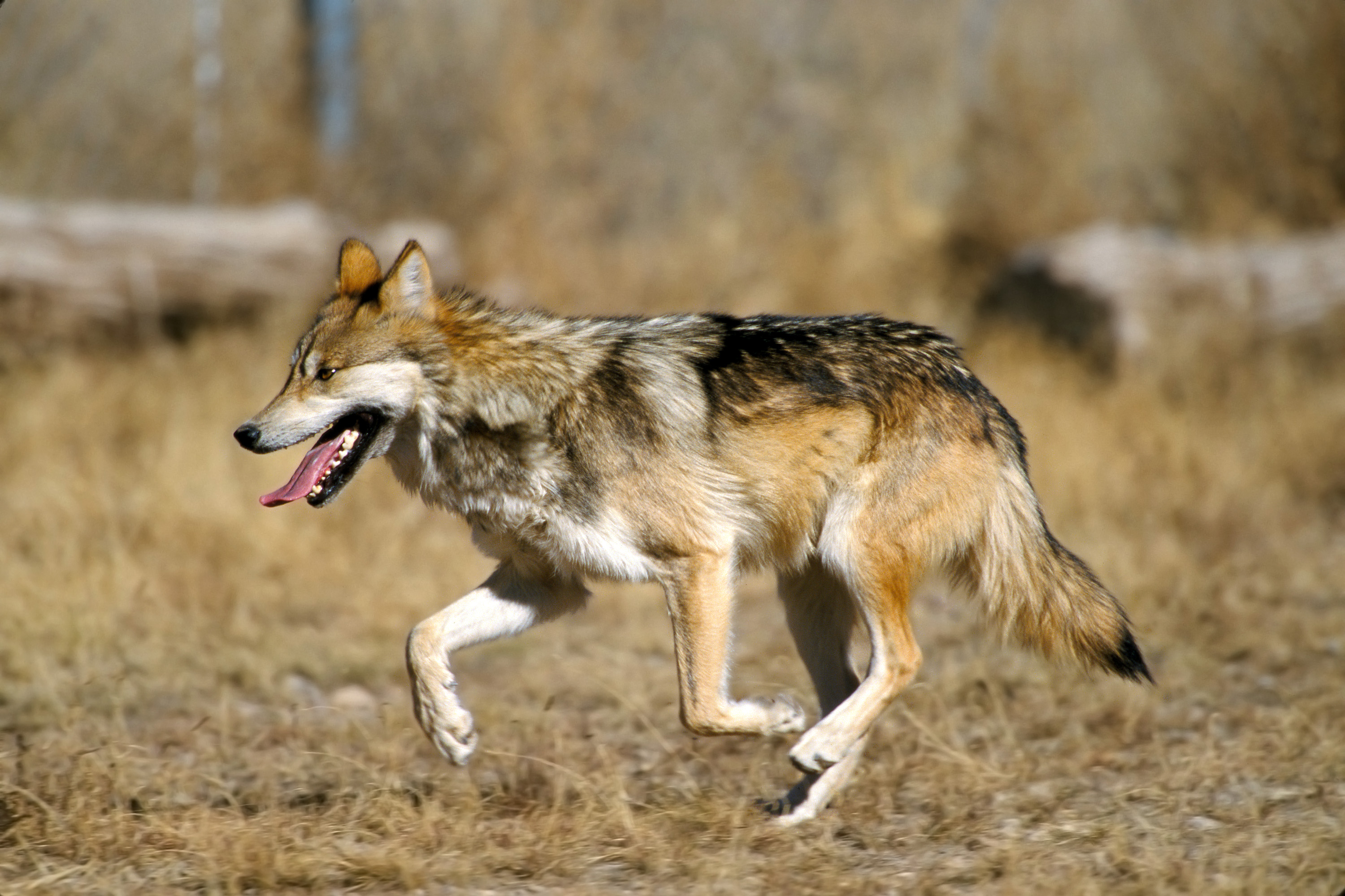
Captive Mexican wolf

The gray wolf is found in approximately 80% of its historical range in Canada, thus making it an important stronghold for the species. Canada is home to about 52,000–60,000 wolves, whose legal status varies according to province and territory. First Nations residents may hunt wolves without restriction, and some provinces require licenses for residents to hunt wolves while others do not. In Alberta, wolves on private land may be baited and hunted by the landowner without requiring a license, and in some areas, wolf hunting bounty programs exist. Large-scale wolf population control through poisoning, trapping and aerial hunting is also presently conducted by government-mandated programs in order to support populations of endangered prey species such as woodland caribou.

In Alaska, the gray wolf population is estimated at 6,000–7,000, and can be legally harvested during hunting and trapping seasons, with bag limits and other restrictions. In 1978, wolves were protected in the United States under the federal Endangered Species Act as it was determined that they were in danger of going extinct and needed protection to aid their recovery. Canadian wolves began to naturally recolonize northern Montana around Glacier National Park in 1979, and the first wolf den in the western U.S. in over half a century was documented there in 1986. The wolf population in northwest Montana initially grew as a result of natural reproduction and dispersal to about 48 wolves by the end of 1994. From 1995 to 1996, wolves from Alberta and British Columbia were reintroduced into Yellowstone National Park and Idaho and expanded their range into the northern Rocky Mountains and Pacific Northwest. Wolves began swimming the Snake River from Idaho to Oregon in the 1990s. The vast majority clustered in their historic range in the northeast corner of the state, where the forests are full of elk and deer. In 2010, state biologists noticed wolves dispersing into the Cascade Range. Washington state officials observed wolves from Idaho, Montana, Oregon, and British Columbia dispersing into eastern Washington and the North Cascades. The California Department of Fish and Wildlife (CDFW) monitored the expansion of wolves in Oregon and began in 2011 to prepare for the possibility of wolves recolonizing the state. The repopulation of wolves in California was recognized in late December 2011, when OR-7, a male wolf from Oregon, became the first confirmed wild wolf in California since 1924. The first resident wolf pack was confirmed in 2015. Additional wolves have been tracked entering the state, as the Cascade Range extends south from Oregon into northern California. Wolves are dispersing into the Sierra Nevada and other portions of their historic habitat.

Wolves from the Greater Yellowstone Ecosystem have dispersed into Colorado several times in the 21st century. In 2021, scientists documented the first litter of pups born to wolves in the state since the wolves' original extirpation. This resident wolf pack is monitored by Colorado Parks & Wildlife. In 2020, voters narrowly approved wolf reintroduction into the state. In December 2023, ten wolves were released on public lands in Colorado's Summit and Grand Counties.

Occasionally, Eastern wolves (Canis lycaon) from Canada disperse into Upstate New York. This has been officially confirmed three times in the 21st century. The most recent wolf to enter New York was killed by a hunter who mistook it for a coyote.

The Western Great Lakes forests are inhabited by wolves which includes the provinces of Manitoba and Ontario along with the Midwestern states of Michigan, Minnesota, and Wisconsin which are estimated to have 4,400 wolves. Management under the Endangered Species Act allowed the wolves in Minnesota to flourish and repopulate northern Wisconsin and the Upper Peninsula of Michigan. Wolves were removed from federal protection in January 2021 with management authority remaining with state and tribal authorities. This was reversed except in Idaho, Montana, Wyoming, and parts of nearby states by a court order on February 10, 2022.

The Mexican wolf (Canis lupus baileyi) was reintroduced to Arizona, New Mexico, and the Sierra Madre Occidental in Mexico in 1998. Reintroduced Mexican wolves in Arizona and New Mexico are protected under the ESA. On March 9, 2022, two new breeding pairs of Mexican gray wolves were released into the wild in the state of Chihuahua in northern Mexico, bringing the total number of Mexican gray wolves in the country to around 45 wild individuals. In March 2026, the Interagency Field Team determined that the wild population in the American Southwest had increased to 319 wolves, with 176 wolves in New Mexico and 143 wolves in Arizona. The annual pup survival rate was 60%. 113 wolves (44% of the population) have collars for monitoring and management.

In 1991, Kentucky's Land Between the Lakes partnered with the U.S. Fish and Wildlife Service for the Red Wolf Recovery Program, a captive breeding program.

== See also ==
- List of gray wolf populations by country

== Bibliography ==
- Mech, L. David; Boitani, Luigi, eds. (2003). Wolves: Behaviour, Ecology and Conservation. University of Chicago Press. ISBN 978-0-226-51696-7.
- Walker, Brett L. (2005). The Lost Wolves Of Japan. University of Washington Press. ISBN 978-0-295-98492-6.
