= Druid Peak =

Mountain in Wyoming, United States

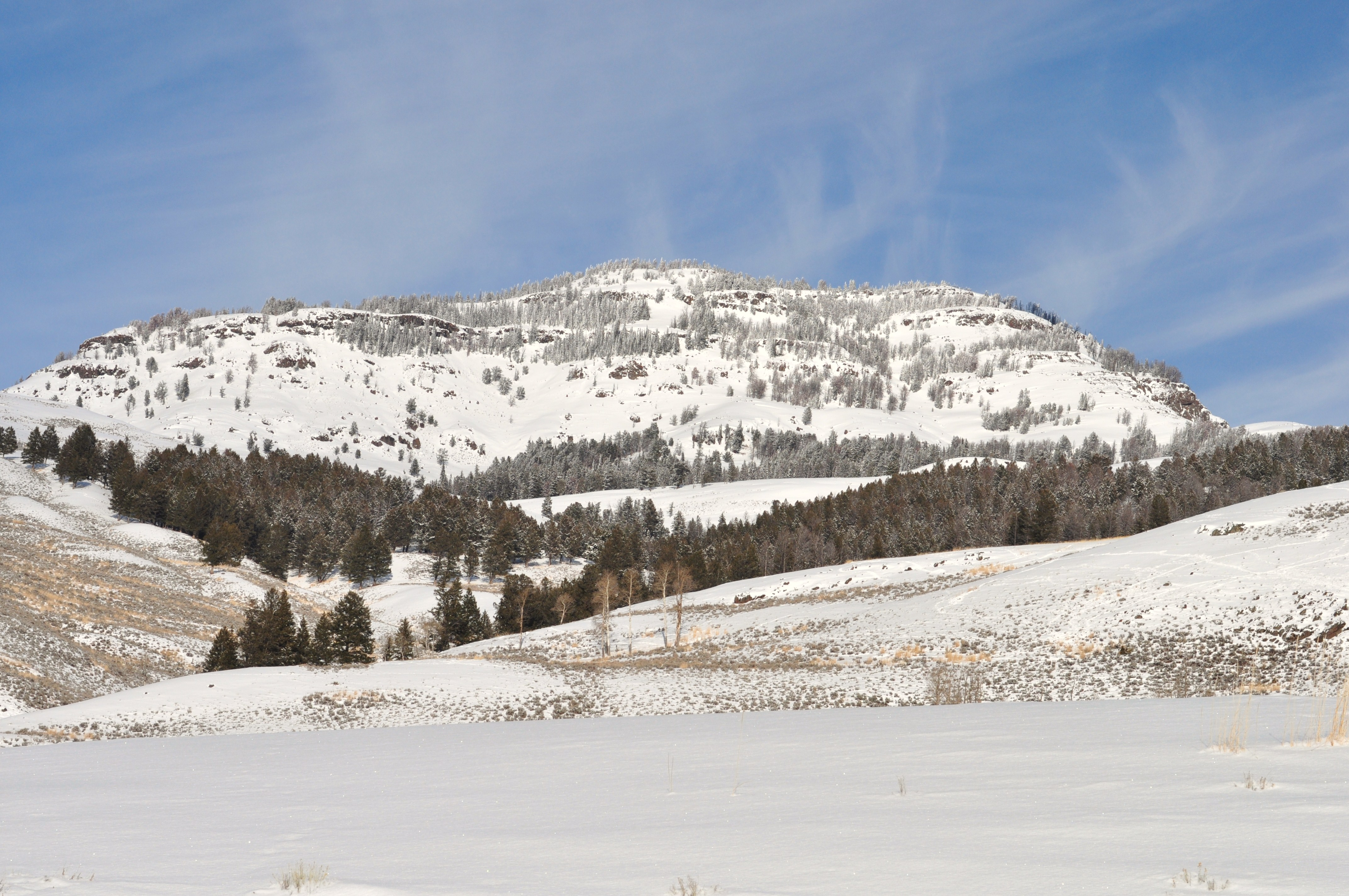
- January 2010

Highest point
- Elevation: 9,577 ft (2,919 m)
- Coordinates: 44°54′16″N 110°10′45″W

Geography
- Location within Wyoming
- Location: Yellowstone National Park, Park County, Wyoming, US
- Parent range: Absaroka Range

Druid Peak (elevation 9,577 feet (2,919 m)) is a moderate domed peak on the southern flank of the Absaroka Range in Yellowstone National Park. The peak lies just north of the Lamar River and Soda Butte Creek confluence at the head of the Lamar Valley. Prior to 1885, this summit was named Soda Hill by members of the Hayden Geological Survey of 1878 and Mount Longfellow or Longfellows' Peak by then park superintendent Philetus Norris in 1880. In 1885, members of the Arnold Hague Geological Survey changed the name to Druid Peak for unknown reasons, but some historians believe it may have been the presence of Stonehenge like rock formations on its eastern face that prompted the name.

Druid Peak is notable for its role in the reintroduction of Wolves into Yellowstone. Rose Creek which flows west from the northern slope of Druid Peak was the site of one of the release pens for the January 1995 release of wolves, the pack to be known as the Rose Creek pack. In January 1996 a second release was made from pens on the slopes of Druid Peak. This pack became known as the Druid Pack.

== See also ==
- Mountains and mountain ranges of Yellowstone National Park
