= Repopulation of wolves in California =

Natural resettlement of wolves into California, US

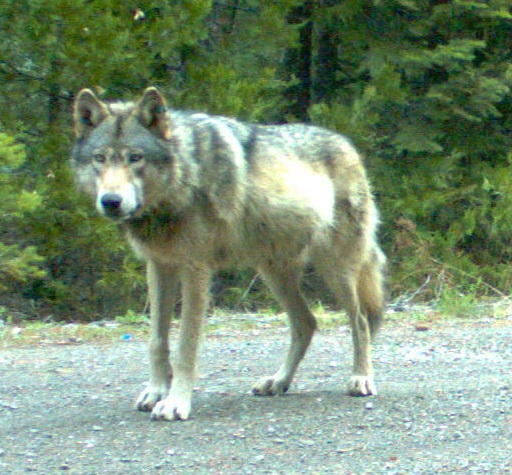
OR-7, California's first resident wolf in over 80 years

In late December 2011, OR-7, a male gray wolf from Oregon, became the first confirmed wild wolf in California since 1924, when wolves were considered extirpated from the state. The first resident wolf pack was confirmed in 2015, after two adults migrated from Oregon and had five pups. Since then, more wolves have entered the state and their population has grown. As of December 2025 there are 55 wolves and nine packs documented in the state. It is likely that wolves are also dispersing undetected through portions of their historic habitat in California.

The California Department of Fish and Wildlife (CDFW) monitors and tracks the wolf population. Most of the wolves are centered in the northern part of the state, though some have ventured much farther south. As they spread through the state they come in conflict with ranchers. The state has intervened to both protect the wolves and assist ranchers.

== Precursors in Oregon ==
Wolves were reintroduced to Idaho in the 1990s and expanded their range into the northern Rocky Mountains and Pacific Northwest. The animals entered Oregon by crossing the Snake River, either by swimming or finding a bridge. The Oregon Department of Fish and Wildlife started studying their behavior in the wild by live-trapping the growing wolf population in Oregon and fitting them with GPS tracking collars that provide daily satellite position reports. State biologists gave a sequential designation to each wolf with a collar. The vast majority remain clustered in their historic range in the northeast corner of the state, where the forests between the high mountains and populated areas are full of elk and deer. In 2010, state biologists noticed wolves in the Cascade Range. However, they were unable to determine if the wolves were single dispersing animals wandering through or were starting to occupy the area since individual wolves will roam searching for a mate and new territory. As the CDFW monitored the expansion of wolves in Oregon, they began in 2011 to prepare for the possibility of wolves recolonizing the state. While the state did not have a program to reintroduce wolves, the assumption was that the natural expansion would eventually have wolves crossing the Oregon–California border. With its dense forests, plentiful deer and other prey, and vast expanses of wilderness where roads do not pose a fatal threat, California has areas of excellent habitat for wolves.

== Initial entry ==
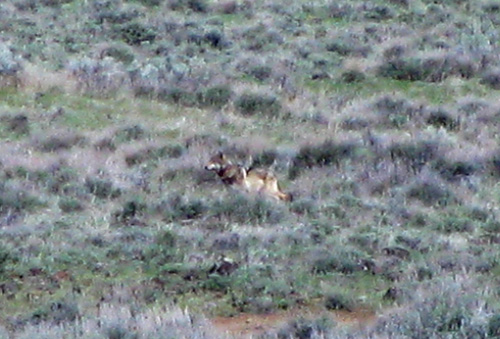
OR-7 in Modoc County (2012)

OR-7 was the first confirmed wild wolf in California since 1924. In late December 2011, the data sent by his GPS tracking collar showed he had crossed the Oregon–California border. Nicknamed Journey, he was a male gray wolf that migrated from the Wallowa Mountains in the northeastern corner of Oregon. It is believed OR-7's parents came from Idaho after wolves were reintroduced in the northern Rockies in the 1990s. After leaving his pack, he wandered generally southwest for more than 1,000 miles (1,600 km) through Oregon, and entered northern California. He spent much of 2012 exploring northeastern California in a circuitous path across seven different counties that eventually covered thousands of miles. In March 2013, he returned to Oregon and was found in 2014 raising a litter of pups in Rogue River–Siskiyou National Forest. Being so near to the California border, he crossed back and forth repeatedly. He is presumed to have died at about 11 years old, an above-average lifespan for a wild wolf, where the usual lifespan is 5-6 years.

The Shasta Pack was the first resident pack in the state in more than a century, due to the presence of five pups in 2015. They lived in Siskiyou County, just south of the Oregon–California border. The pack's alpha female came from the same pack as OR-7, the two wolves being siblings. The CDFW confirmed the wolves had established territory in California with footage from a trail camera in 2015. Biologists believed the two adult wolves migrated into the state from southern Oregon. One of the grown-up pups was found in northwestern Nevada in 2016, the first wolf verified in Nevada in nearly 100 years. They were involved in what was possibly the first modern predation in California when they may have killed a calf they ate in November 2015. Wolves are typically scavengers so it is common for a cow to die of disease and then the wolves will come. The pack disappeared under unexplained circumstances.

== Natural expansion ==
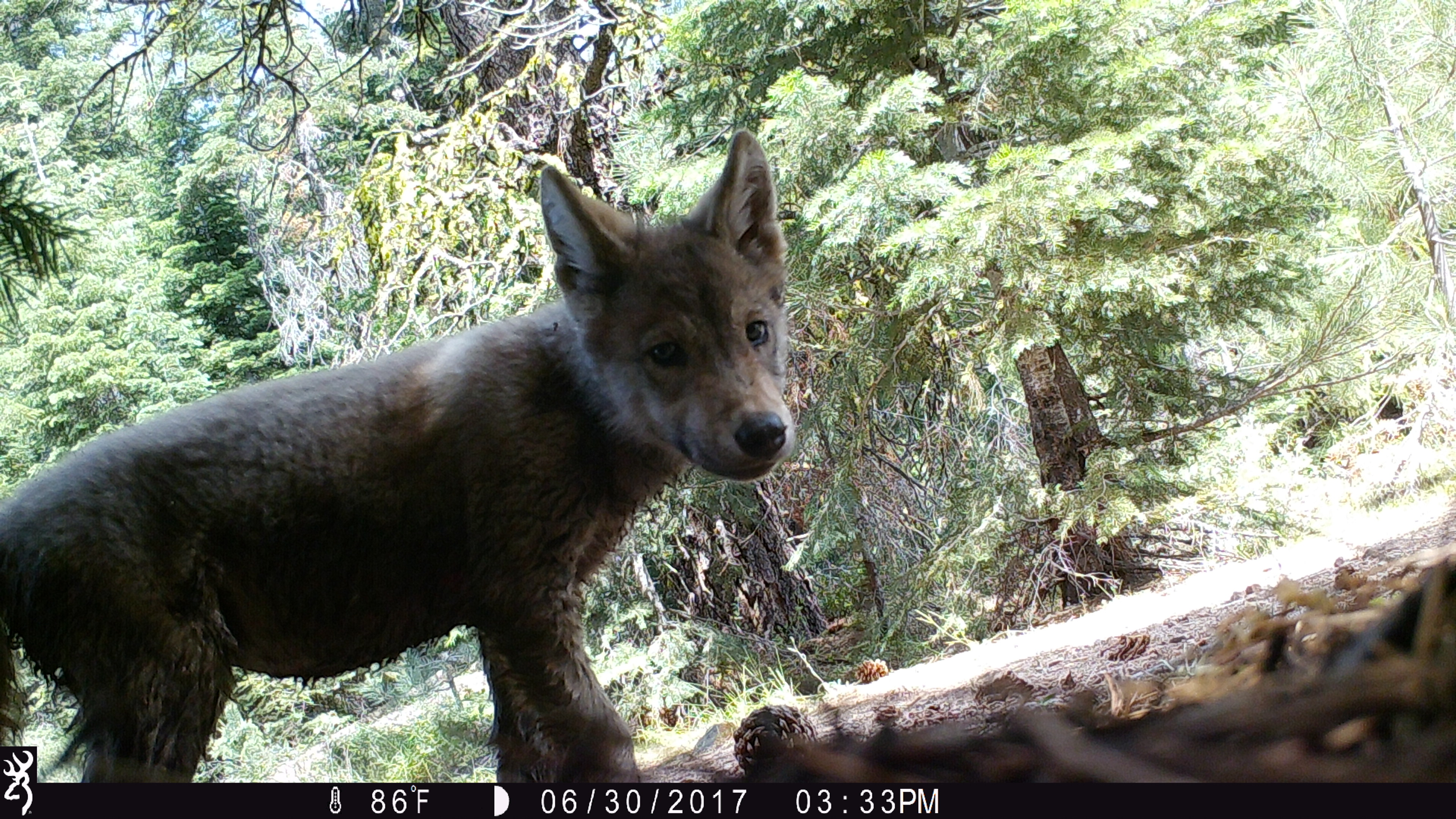
2017 trail camera photo of the Lassen Pack by the United States Forest Service

The Lassen Pack, living in Lassen National Forest was confirmed in the fall of 2016. The first breeding male of the Lassen Pack was CA-08M, son of OR-7. In June 2017, CDFW biologists fitted the pack's breeding female, known as LAS01F, with a tracking collar. She is not related to known Oregon wolves, and genetic analysis indicates that she likely dispersed from some other part of the northern Rocky Mountain wolf population. Born in 2014, possibly in Wyoming where she has half-siblings, she traveled 800 miles (1,300 km) or more through the Great Basin Desert in Utah and Nevada, or a much longer journey through Idaho and Oregon. The CDFW and the U.S. Forest Service traced the four pups from this second pack in 2017 to OR-7. The pair went on to have five pups in 2018, and four pups in 2019. CA-08M had not been detected with the pack since spring 2019. A black-colored adult male is the new breeding male, LAS16M, who began traveling with the pack as early as June 2019. The pack had two litters of four pups each in 2020 with LAS09F, a two-year-old female, also giving birth. LAS09F had six pups in 2021, but LAS01F had not been detected since fall 2020. Most of the Lassen Pack's activity has been tracked across the western parts of Lassen County, and the northernmost part of Plumas County. LAS13M, a collared young male from the pack, journeyed to Lake County, Oregon, in early October 2020. The Lassen Pack survived the Dixie Fire when it burned through their home range in August 2021.

By 2019, 15 wolves in three different groups had become established in the Cascade Range of Oregon. Northern California is easily accessible as the Cascades extend southerly into the state. Wolves leave a scent trail that they can use to communicate and retrace their wanderings. Wildlife experts explain that it is possible for other wolves to follow said urine scent and these initial wolf sojourns can open up new territory.

OR-85, a two-year-old male, left the Mt. Emily Pack in Oregon and traveled to Siskiyou County in November 2020. In January 2021, a female related to Oregon's Rogue Pack joined OR-85 in the northernmost part of California to form the Whaleback Pack. In September 2021, CDFW wolf specialist Kent Laudon confirmed the Whaleback Pack had seven pups. With both the Whaleback and Lassen packs having pups in 2021, the state had at least two wolf packs with pups for the first time in over a hundred years. In the spring of 2022, the Whaleback Pack had eight pups, all of which survived into the fall. The Lassen Pack had five pups in 2022. CDFW captured and collared two wolves in the Whaleback Pack in March 2023. They were able to track one wolf in Siskiyou County through intermittent signals coming from a malfunctioning collar.

OR-93 was the 16th documented gray wolf in the recent history of the state. The two-year-old male wolf was fitted with a purple radio collar in June 2020 by tribal biologists on the Warm Springs Indian Reservation in the northern Cascade Mountains in Oregon. After leaving his White River pack on January 30, 2021, he reached Mono County, east of Yosemite National Park in the central Sierra Nevada in February, which was the farthest south a wolf has been tracked in California in more than a century. Heading west, he crossed the agricultural area of the Central Valley near Fresno. Ranchers felt he was a threat to livestock due to the lack of wild prey in the area. They had been notified of his presence by the California Cattlemen's Association which had been watching his progress since the wolf entered the state. Eventually, he made it as far as San Luis Obispo County, which is nearly 1,000 miles (1,600 km) from his birthplace south of Mount Hood in western Oregon. The last wolf sighting in the Central Coast area had been in 1826. After being tracked through sixteen California counties, the signal was lost. While avoiding populated areas, the wolf had crossed three major highways: California Route 99, Interstate 5, and Highway 101. OR-93 may have been spotted on May 15 in southwestern Kern County in a videotape of a wolf at a water trough on private property. September wolf sightings in rural northern Ventura County were confirmed by CDFW through the identification of recent wolf tracks. Due to the purple collar, the animal was assumed to be OR-93. This is the farthest south in California that a gray wolf has been documented since one was captured in San Bernardino County in 1922. He was found dead in November, apparently killed by a vehicle on a highway. A truck driver notified authorities after he noticed a dead wolf along a dirt trail in Kern County off Interstate 5 near the town of Lebec. It is likely several other individual, undetected wolves are dispersing through the state.

The Beckwourth Pack was identified in May 2021 when a trail camera spotted three wolves in eastern Plumas County. Evidence of the three wolves were seen in May at the carcass of a confirmed wolf depredation. Preliminary DNA analysis indicated one of the wolves in the Beckwourth Pack is LAS12F, a female from the Lassen Packs 2019 litter. The origins of the other two wolves are unknown. A wildlife biologist employed by CDFW attempted to capture members of the pack in order to place collars on the wolves, take blood samples and swabs, and test for disease.

Also in May, OR-103, a young male who was outfitted with a GPS collar in Deschutes County, Oregon, crossed the border into Siskiyou County. OR-103 developed a crippled front paw, and has no way to catch quick, preferred prey such as deer and elk.

In March 2023, a private trail camera picked up wolves in Sierra Nevada foothills of Tehama County between Los Molinos and the Ishi Wilderness. The CDFW had been getting reports about what appeared to be three wolves. In addition to the Tehama wolves, a group of between two and four members was spotted in western Lassen County over the winter of 2023.

In August 2023, CDFW identified a new wolf pack in Tulare County, approximately 200 miles (320 km) south of the nearest known wolf pack. The pack consists of at least one breeding pair and four pups – two males and two females. Genetic testing of scat determined that the adult female is a direct descendant of OR-7, and the breeding male is descended from the Lassen Pack. The news came a month after reported wolf sightings in Sequoia National Forest. The pack was named the Yowlumni Pack in association with the Tule River tribe.

The CDFW confirmed five more packs in 2024. The Beyem Seyo Pack and Harvey Pack were named in February. The former has at least two adults and six pups and resides in Plumas County. The Harvey Pack, in Lassen County, comprises at least two adults and one pup. The following month the Antelope Pack with two individuals was reported. In November, the CDFW then reported two more packs. An unnamed pack with two adults and two pups is near Lassen Volcanic National Park. Lastly, the Diamond Pack was confirmed with two members near Lake Tahoe.

In February 2026, BEY03F, a three-year-old female from the Beyem Seyo Pack in Plumas County, was sighted in the San Gabriel Mountains of Los Angeles County. She was previously seen associating with the Yowlumni Pack in Tulare County but dispersed from their territory a week prior to appearing in the San Gabriels. She is thought to have traveled over 370 miles (600 km) from her birthplace to reach Los Angeles County. The same individual later entered Sequoia National Park. This is the first documented wolf presence in over a hundred years for both Los Angeles County and Sequoia National Park.

== Conservation and challenges ==
=== Legal protections ===
In the 1960s and 1970s, national awareness of environmental issues and consequences led to the passage of laws designed to correct the mistakes of the past and help prevent similar mistakes in the future. Wolves in the United States were protected under the federal Endangered Species Act in 1978 as they were in danger of going extinct and needed protection to aid their recovery. While wolves have been repeatedly delisted and relisted under the act's protections in some states since 2011, as of August 2025, wolves are listed as endangered in California.

The California Fish and Game Commission granted the gray wolf protection in 2014 under the state's California Endangered Species Act. Although ranchers have argued for the right to protect their livestock, the protections forbid harassment or killing of wolves, including if they prey on livestock. The CDFW had recommended against the inclusion as a wolf management plan was being developed that would protect the animals. The management plan would attempt to balance the needs of wildlife with the needs of people using the best available science. The plan could allow flexibility for ranchers concerned about attacks on livestock and deal with concerns that wolves might decimate elk herds. In 2016, the department completed the plan and published the Conservation Plan for Gray Wolves in California. The management plan provides policy for wildlife managers as they handle potential conflicts between wolves, humans, and livestock. To balance ample prey for wolves with opportunities for hunters, the plan included management of deer, elk, and other game animals. The plan also covers the impact that wolves as predators may have on other species of concern. A judge found in 2019 that wolves wandering in naturally from neighboring states should be protected by California's laws after a lawsuit was brought by the Pacific Legal Foundation, the California Farm Bureau Federation and the California Cattlemen's Association challenging the listing.

In 2019, the California Fish and Game Commission opposed the federal proposal to delist wolves from the Endangered Species Act. They argued that federal protection was still needed to make a full recovery since the future wolf population in California will depend on expanding from other states. In November 2021, a federal judge held a hearing on whether wolves were properly classified under the Endangered Species Act prior to losing their protected status in the previous year. The judge ruled to restore federal protections the following year.

=== Habitat ===
Northern California alone is estimated to have 23,000 square miles (60,000 km^{2}) of potential wolf habitat; that could support upwards of five hundred wolves. In addition, the presence of wolves in the state affects other flora and fauna. Management of the population of deer protects vegetation for songbirds and beavers. In Southern California, the region faces more challenges in supporting gray wolf habitat, as there is higher human population and urban development. Wolves have expanded and migrated down to Central California and have been recorded in the Sequoia National Forest.

=== Conflicts with ranchers ===
Wolves have multiple negative effects on cattle raised as livestock. Most notably, wolves prey on cattle. In addition, the presence of wolves increases stress hormones in cattle, which, in turn, limit their weight and reproductive success.

The state created a $3 million fund in 2021 to compensate ranchers for such effects from wolves. The money was paid out to the ranchers for killed livestock, mechanisms to protect livestock, and stress to cattle induced by the wolves. In 2024, the funds were completely distributed after which the state budgeted a new $600,000 for the fund. Another $2 million were allocated in 2026.

The CDFW seeks to collar at least one animal per pack, in part to alert local ranchers when wolves are in their area. Twenty-one wolf depredations of livestock were confirmed in 2023.

The CDFW first euthanized wolves in 2025 after they habitually preyed on cattle. Members of the Beyem Seyo pack killed 70 livestock that year. After nearly 100 attempts at nonlethal deterrence by the agency failed, the CDFW decided to break from its policy of deterrence and euthanize four of the pack's wolves. The CDFW's plan was to relocate the pack's remaining wolves and the pack is no longer considered active. As a government agency, the CDFW has some exemptions from the federal and state legal protections. According to the University of California Agriculture and Natural Resources the Beyem Seyo pack cost ranchers and the agency a combined minimum of $2.6 million in 2025.

A 2026 study of the Lassen and Harvey packs found cattle make up roughly half of their diet. The other half comes from natural prey. Mule deer and elk would be the primary natural prey for California wolves. An author of the study highlighted the shortage of those deer in the state as a contributing cause for why cattle constituted such a large portion of the wolves' diet. The study does not provide insights into how often the cattle are hunted by the wolves or are scavenged upon after dying from unrelated causes.

There have been studies on whether lethal removal is an effective strategy, as removing a single pack member can drastically affect the pack dynamic, especially if the wolf was an alpha. The loss of a female breeder would cause negative implications on the rest of the pack; however, natural pack structure is restored with decreased hunting. Wolves tend to have a higher level of stress hormones when occupying area where heavy hunting occurs. Overall, it is determined that hunting gray wolves causes detrimental effects on gray wolf pack level biological processes. A study of lethal control of wolves in other states found that mortality of less than 25% actually led to an increase in livestock depredations.

== See also ==
- List of gray wolf populations by country
- History of wolves in Yellowstone
- Repopulation of wolves in Colorado
- Repopulation of wolves in Midwestern United States
- Environmental issues in Wyoming § Gray wolf
