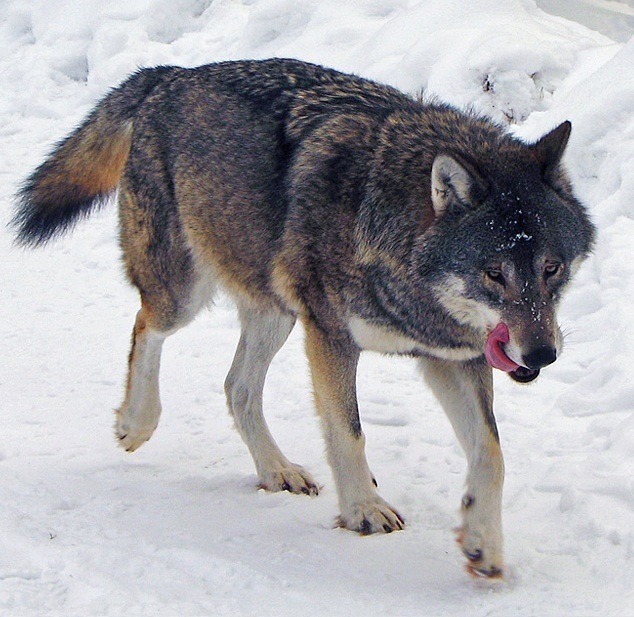
- In the Kolmården Wildlife Park, Sweden

Conservation status
- Least Concern (IUCN 3.1)

Scientific classification
- Kingdom: Animalia
- Phylum: Chordata
- Class: Mammalia
- Order: Carnivora
- Family: Canidae
- Genus: Canis
- Species: C. lupus
- Subspecies: C. l. lupus

Trinomial name
- Canis lupus lupus (Linnaeus, 1758)
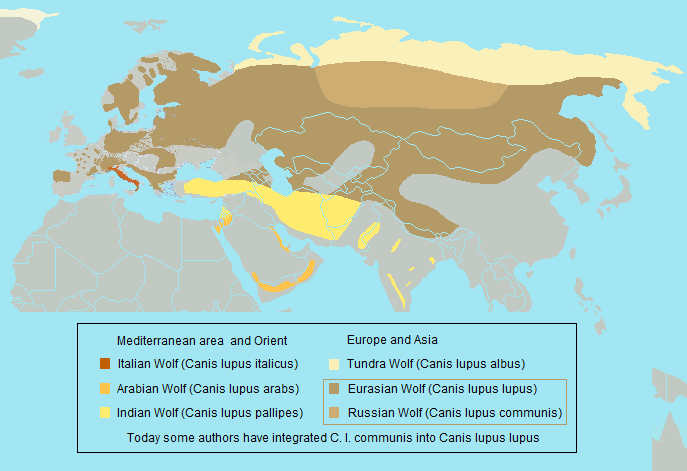
- C. l. lupus range

Synonyms
- List: altaicus (Noack, 1911); argunensis (Dybowski, 1922); canus (Sélys Longchamps, 1839); communis (Dwigubski, 1804); deitanus (Cabrera, 1907); desertorum (Bogdanov, 1882); flavus (Kerr, 1792); fulvus (Sélys Longchamps, 1839); italicus (Altobello, 1921); kurjak (Bolkay, 1925); lycaon (Trouessart, 1910); major (Ogérien, 1863); minor (Ogerien, 1863); niger (Hermann, 1804); orientalis (Wagner, 1841); orientalis (Dybowski, 1922); signatus (Cabrera, 1907)

= Eurasian wolf =

Subspecies of carnivore

The Eurasian wolf (Canis lupus lupus), also known as the common wolf, is a subspecies of grey wolf native to Europe and Asia. It was once widespread throughout Eurasia prior to the Middle Ages. Aside from an extensive paleontological record, Indo-European languages typically have several words for "wolf", thus attesting to the animal's abundance and cultural significance. It was held in high regard in Baltic, Celtic, Slavic, Turkic, ancient Greek, Roman, Dacian, and Thracian cultures, whilst having an ambivalent reputation in early Germanic cultures.

It is the largest of Old World grey wolves, averaging 39 kg (86 lb) in Europe; however, exceptionally large individuals have weighed 69–79 kg (152–174 lb), though this varies according to region. Its fur is relatively short and coarse, and is generally of a tawny colour, with white on the throat that barely extends to the cheeks. Melanists, albinos, and erythrists are rare, and mostly the result of wolf-dog hybridisation. According to Erik Zimen, the howl of the Eurasian wolf is much more protracted and melodious than that of North American grey wolf subspecies, whose howls are louder and have a stronger emphasis on the first syllable.

Many Eurasian wolf populations are forced to subsist largely on livestock and garbage in areas with dense human activity, though wild ungulates such as moose, red deer, roe deer and wild boar are still the most important food sources in Russia and the more mountainous regions of Eastern Europe. Other prey species include reindeer, argali, mouflon, wisent, saiga, ibex, chamois, wild goats, fallow deer, and musk deer.

== Physical description ==
=== Build ===
In describing North American wolves, John Richardson used European wolves as a basis for comparison, summarising the differences between the two forms as:

The European wolf's head is narrower, and tapers gradually to form the nose, which is produced on the same plane with the forehead. Its ears are higher and somewhat nearer to each other; their length exceeds the distance between the auditory opening and the eye. Its loins are more slender, its legs longer, feet narrower, and its tail is more thinly clothed with fur. The shorter ears, broader forehead, and thicker muzzle of the American Wolf, with the bushiness of the hair behind the cheek, give it a physiognomy more like the social visage of an Esquimaux dog than the sneaking aspect of a European Wolf.

=== Size ===
The size of Eurasian wolves is subject to geographic variation, with animals in Russia and Scandinavia being larger than those residing in Western Europe, having been compared by Theodore Roosevelt to the large wolves of north-western Montana and Washington. Adults from Russia measure 105–160 cm (41–63 in) in length, 80–85 cm (31–33 in) in shoulder height, and weigh on average 32–50 kg (71–110 lb), with a maximum weight of 69–80 kg (152–176 lb). The largest on record was killed after World War II in the Kobelyakski Area of the Poltavskij Region in the Ukrainian SSR, and weighed 86 kg (190 lb). Larger weights of 92–96 kg (203–212 lb) have been reported in Ukraine, though the circumstances under which these latter animals were weighed are not known. Although similar in size to central Russian wolves, Swedish and Norwegian wolves tend to be more heavily built with deeper shoulders. One wolf killed in Romania was recorded to have weighed 72 kg (159 lb). In Italian wolves, excepting the tail, body lengths range from 110 to 148 cm, while shoulder height is 50–70 cm. Males weigh between 25 and 35 kg (55 and 77 lb) and rarely 45 kg (99 lb). The now extinct British wolves are known to have reached similar sizes to Arctic wolves.

== Range ==
=== Decline ===
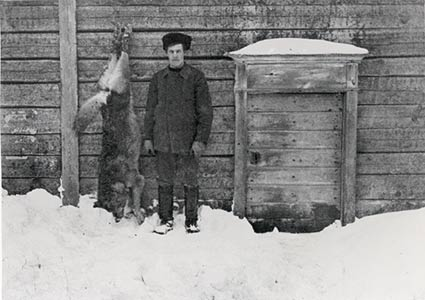
The last wolf in central Finland was killed in 1911 in the town of Karstula.

The extermination of Northern Europe's wolves first became an organized effort during the Middle Ages, and continued until the late 1800s. In England, wolf persecution was enforced by legislation, and the last wolf was likely killed in the late 15th century during the reign of Henry VII. Wolves survived longer in Scotland, where they sheltered in vast tracts of forest, which were subsequently burned down. Wolves managed to survive in the forests of Braemar and Sutherland until 1684. The extirpation of wolves in Ireland followed a similar course, with the last wolf believed to have been killed in 1786. A wolf bounty was introduced in Sweden in 1647, after the extermination of moose and reindeer forced wolves to feed on livestock. The Sami extirpated wolves in northern Sweden in organized drives. By 1960, few wolves remained in Sweden, due to the use of snowmobiles in hunting them, with the last specimen being killed in 1966. The grey wolf was exterminated in Denmark in 1772 and Norway's last wolf was killed in 1973. The species was almost wiped out in 20th-century Finland, despite regular dispersals from Russia. The grey wolf was present only in the eastern and northern parts of Finland by 1900, though its numbers increased after World War II. Although the Finnish wolf population rose by 2005 to around 250 individuals, by 2013, their numbers had again declined to the mid-1990s figure of around 140. This was despite government measures to keep breeding numbers viable. At the beginning of 2016, the wolf population was roughly 300-350 individuals.

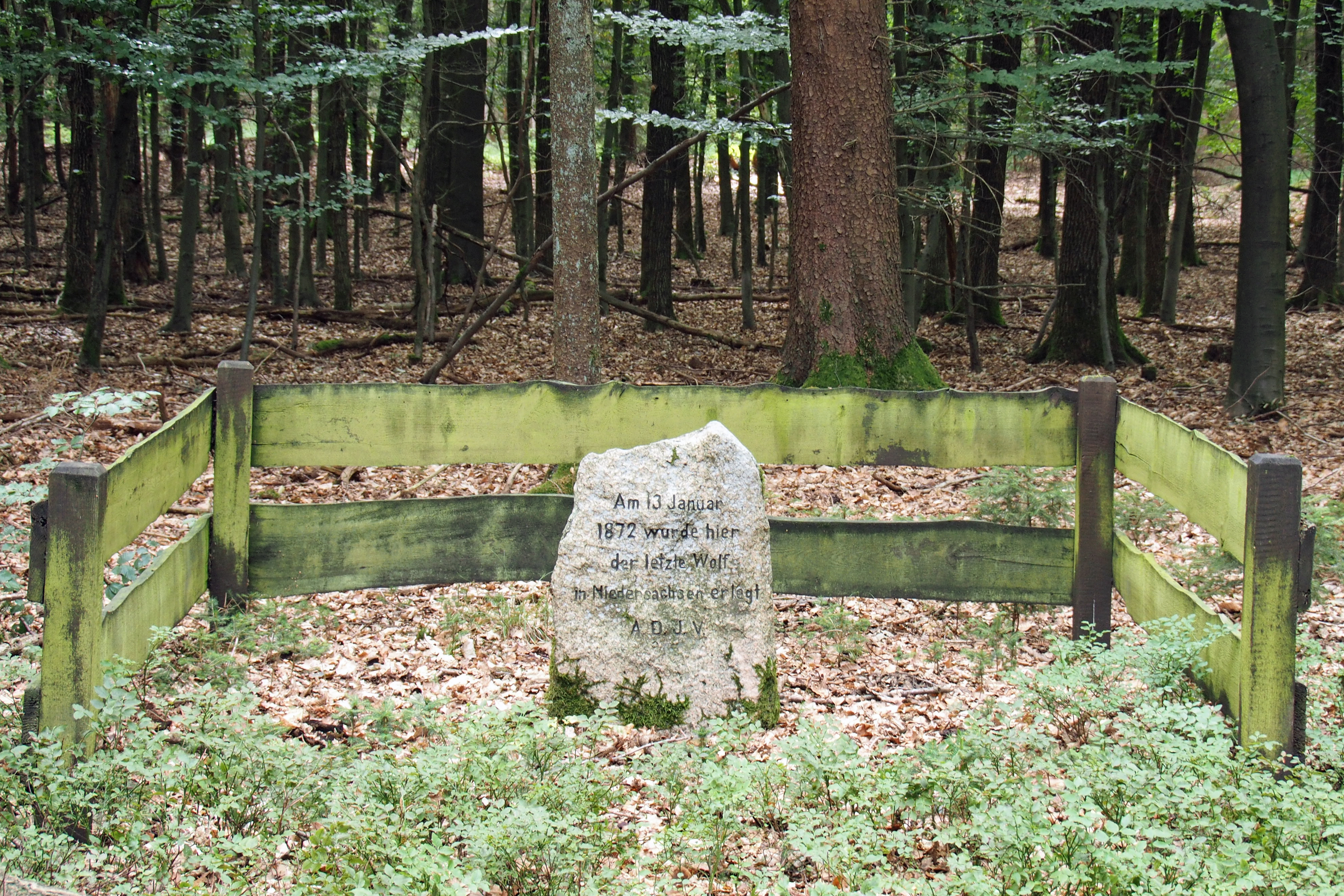
Monument to the shooting of one of the last wolves in Lower Saxony 1872

In Central Europe, wolves were dramatically reduced in number during the early 19th century, due to organized hunts and reductions in ungulate populations. In Bavaria, the last wolf was killed in 1847, and wolves had disappeared from the Rhine regions by 1899 and largely disappeared in Switzerland before the end of the 19th century. In 1934, Nazi Germany introduced the first legislation regulating the protection of wolves. The last free-living wolf to be killed on the soil of present-day Germany before 1945 was the so-called "Tiger of Sabrodt", which was shot near Hoyerswerda, Lusatia (then Lower Silesia), in 1904. Today, wolves have returned to the area.

Wolf hunting in France was first institutionalized by Charlemagne between 800 and 813, when he established the louveterie, a special corps of wolf hunters. The louveterie was abolished after the French Revolution in 1789, but was re-established in 1814. In 1883, up to 1,386 wolves were killed, with many more by poison.

In Eastern Europe, wolves were never fully exterminated, due to the area's contiguity with Asia and its large forested areas. However, Eastern European wolf populations were reduced to very low numbers by the late 19th century. Wolves were extirpated in Slovakia during the first decade of the 20th century and, by the mid-20th century, could be found only in a few forested areas in eastern Poland. Wolves in the eastern Balkans benefitted from the region's contiguity with the former Soviet Union and large areas of plains, mountains, and farmlands. Wolves in Hungary occurred in only half the country around the start of the 20th century, and were largely restricted to the Carpathian Basin. Wolf populations in Romania remained largely substantial, with an average of 2,800 wolves being killed annually out of a population of 4,600 from 1955 to 1965. An all-time low was reached in 1967, when the population was reduced to 1,550 animals. The extermination of wolves in Bulgaria was relatively recent, as a previous population of about 1,000 animals in 1955 was reduced to about 100–200 in 1964. In Greece, the species disappeared from the southern Peloponnese in 1930. Despite periods of intense hunting during the 18th century, wolves never disappeared in the western Balkans, from Albania to the former Yugoslavia. Organized persecution of wolves began in Yugoslavia in 1923, with the setting up of the Wolf Extermination Committee in Kočevje, Slovenia. The committee was successful in reducing wolf numbers in the Dinaric Alps.

The grey wolf's range in the Soviet Union encompassed nearly the entire territory of the country, being absent only on the Solovetsky Islands, Franz-Josef Land, Severnaya Zemlya, and the Karagin, Commander, and Shantar Islands. The species was exterminated twice in Crimea, once after the Russian Civil War, and again after World War II. Following the two world wars, Soviet wolf populations peaked twice; 30,000 wolves were harvested annually from a population of 200,000 during the 1940s, with 40,000–50,000 harvested during peak years. Soviet wolf populations reached a low around 1970, disappearing over much of European Russia.

As of 2017, the IUCN Red List still recorded the grey wolf as regionally extinct in eight European countries: Austria, Belgium, Denmark, Ireland, Luxembourg, Netherlands, Switzerland, and the United Kingdom. Since then, wolves have returned to and, in some cases, firmly established themselves in all of those countries, except for the islands of Ireland and Great Britain.

=== Recovery ===
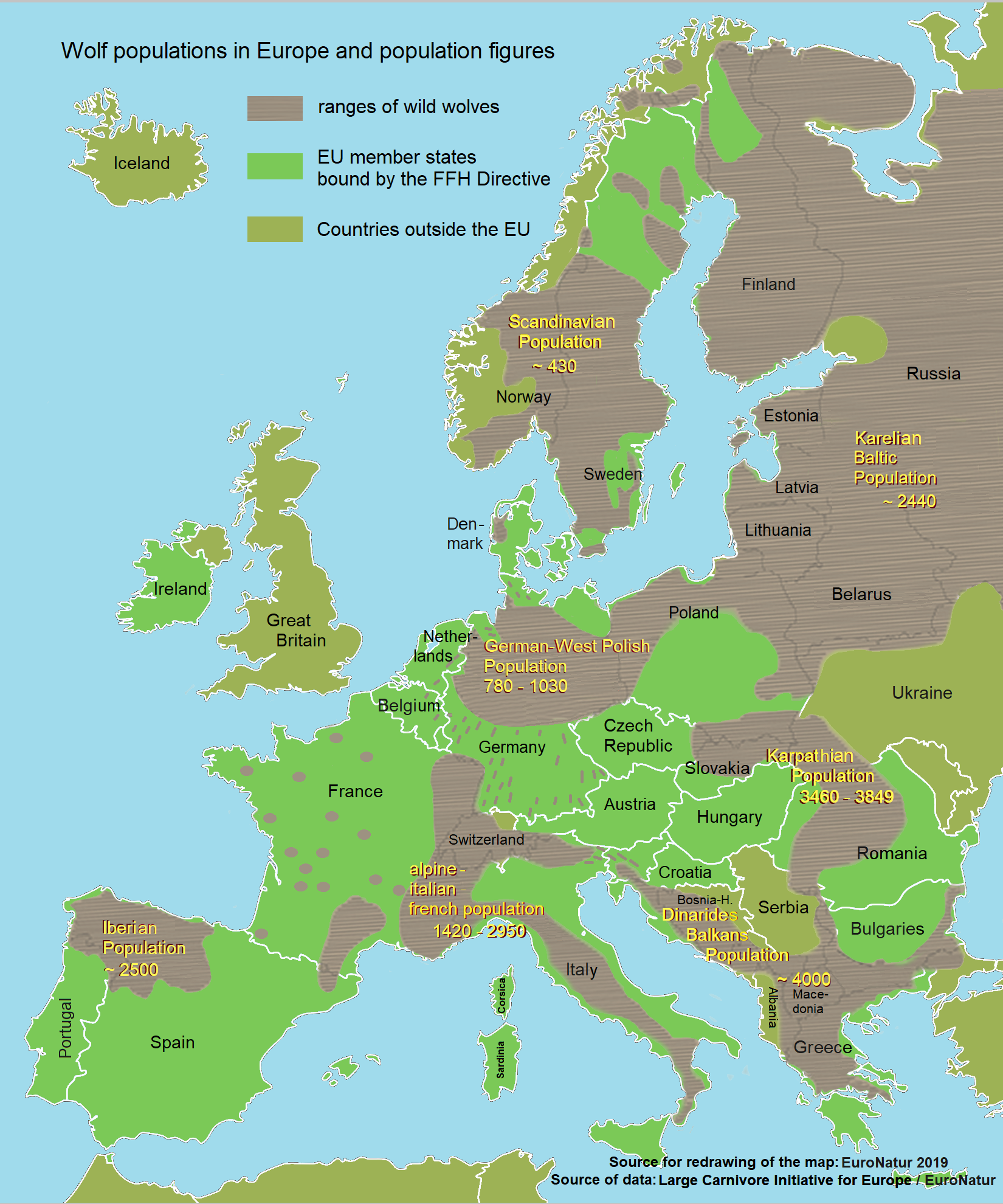
With the exception of the wolves in Italy and the Iberian Peninsula, all populations shown here consist of Eurasian wolves.

The recovery of European wolf populations began after the 1950s, when traditional pastoral and rural economies declined and thus removed the need to heavily persecute wolves. By the 1980s, small and isolated wolf populations expanded in the wake of decreased human density in rural areas and the recovery of wild prey populations.

In 1978, wolves began recolonising central Sweden after a 12-year absence, and have since expanded into southern Norway. As of 2005, the total number of Swedish and Norwegian wolves was estimated to be at least 100, including 11 breeding pairs. The grey wolf is fully protected in Sweden and partially controlled in Norway. The Scandinavian wolf populations owe their continued existence to neighbouring Finland's contiguity with the Republic of Karelia, which houses a large population of wolves. Wolves in Finland are protected throughout the country, and can be hunted only with specific permission. As of December 2021, the Swedish-Norwegian wolf seems to be extinct and any wolf individuals found in these countries appear to be solely Finland wolves. The decline in the moose populations has reduced the wolf's food supply. Since 2011, the Netherlands, Belgium, and Denmark have also reported wolf sightings presumably by natural migration from adjacent countries.

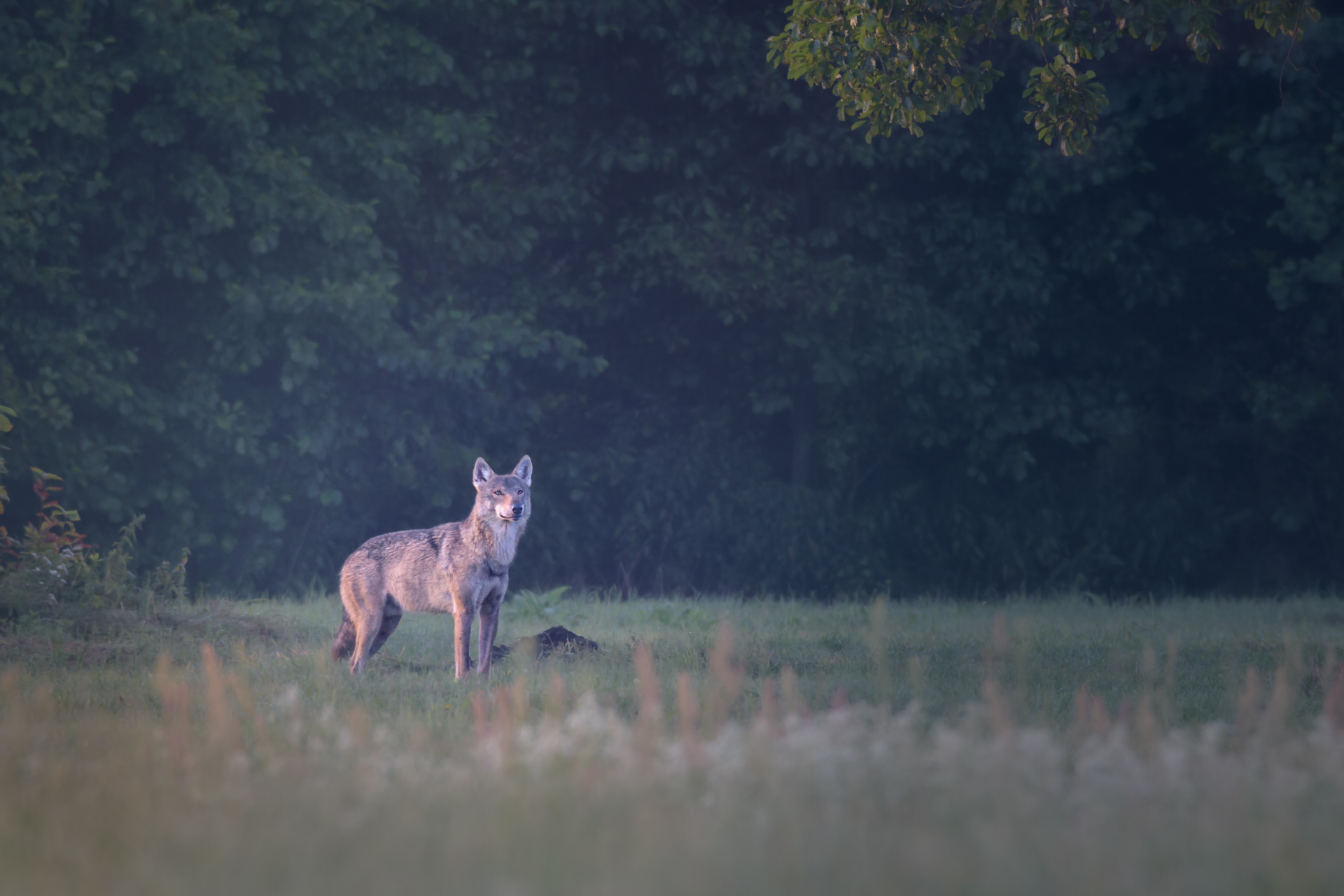
Eurasian wolf in Masovian Voivodeship, Poland

Wolf populations in Poland have increased to about 800–900 individuals since being classified as a game species in 1976, now for more than two decades under legal protection in Annex V and II of the Habitats Directive. The number of wolf packs in western Poland has continued to increase. This is confirmed by the results of the wolf monitoring financed by the International Fund for Animal Welfare and the nature conservation foundation EuroNatur, which is carried out by the Polish nature conservation organisation Association for Nature Wolf (AfN Wolf). The Polish scientists estimated that at the end of the 2018/19 monitoring year, at least 95 resident wolf packs would be west of the Vistula, more than at any time since data collection began in 2003. For the first time, the scientists were also able to detect at least three reproducing packs in the Sudeten Mountains in the Czech–Polish border area.

Poland plays a fundamental role in providing routes of expansion into neighbouring Central European countries. In the east, its range overlaps with populations in Lithuania, Belarus, Ukraine, and Slovakia. A population in western Poland expanded into eastern Germany, and in 2000, the first pups were born on German territory. In 2012, an estimated 14 wolf packs were living in Germany (mostly in the east) and a pack with pups has been sighted within 24 km (15 mi) of Berlin. Since then, the population has steadily increased and the area of distribution has grown and extended to large parts of the Federal Republic. In the monitoring year 2020/21, there were a total of 157 packs, 27 pairs and 19 individual territorial animals in 11 federal states. The number of pups was 556. Since the summer of 2021, around 1400 wolves, adult animals and young ones, are estimated to be living in Germany.

As of 1 June 2021 the grey wolf is protected in Slovakia and can't be killed, bought, sold. A few Slovak wolves disperse into the Czech Republic, where they are afforded full protection. Wolves in Slovakia, Ukraine, and Croatia may disperse into Hungary, where the lack of cover hinders the buildup of an autonomous population. Although wolves have special status in Hungary, they may be hunted with a year-round permit if they cause problems. Romania has a large population of wolves, numbering 2500 animals. The wolf has been a protected animal in Romania since 1996, although the law is not enforced. The number of wolves in Albania and North Macedonia is largely unknown, despite the importance the two countries have in linking wolf populations from Greece to those of Bosnia and Herzegovina and Croatia. Although protected, many wolves are illegally killed in Greece annually, and their future is uncertain. Wolf numbers have declined in Bosnia and Herzegovina since 1986, while the species is fully protected in neighbouring Croatia and Slovenia.

Wolf populations throughout Northern and Central Asia are largely unknown, but are estimated in the hundreds of thousands based on annual harvests. Since the fall of the Soviet Union, continent-wide extermination of wolves has ceased, and wolf populations have increased to about 25,000–30,000 animals throughout the former Soviet Union, an increase of about 150%.

== Legal protection ==
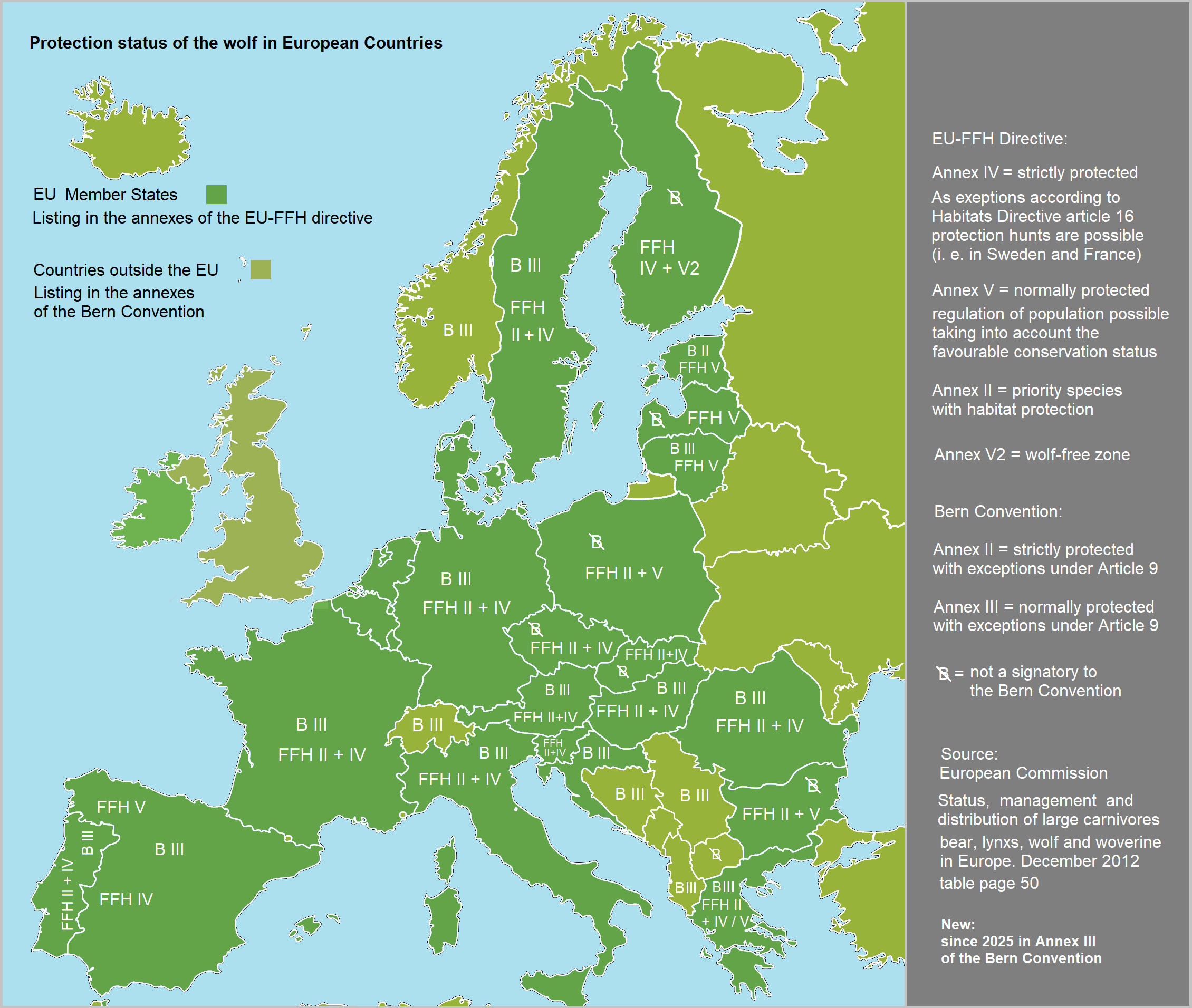
Protection status in Europe

The Eurasian wolf and the Italian wolf are legally protected in most European countries, either by listing in the annexes of the EU-FHH Directive or by the Bern Convention or both, depending on whether a country is a signatory of the Bern Convention or not.

For EU member states, an application for a change in the listing of the wolf in the annexes to the Habitats Directive requires the approval of the Division for Large Carnivores in the European Commission, in which members of the LCIE have an advisory role. States outside the EU which are signatories to the Bern Convention may submit a corresponding application for a change of protection status to the Standing Committee of the Berne Convention, in which the LCIE also has an advisory role. For example, Switzerland submitted such a request in 2006, which was rejected at the time. In 2018, Switzerland again requested the reduction of the protection status. Due to the passive behaviour of the Large Carnivore Initiative for Europe, processing is delayed. (See also Favourable conservation status of wolves in Europe).

== Conflicts ==
=== Attacks on grazing animals ===
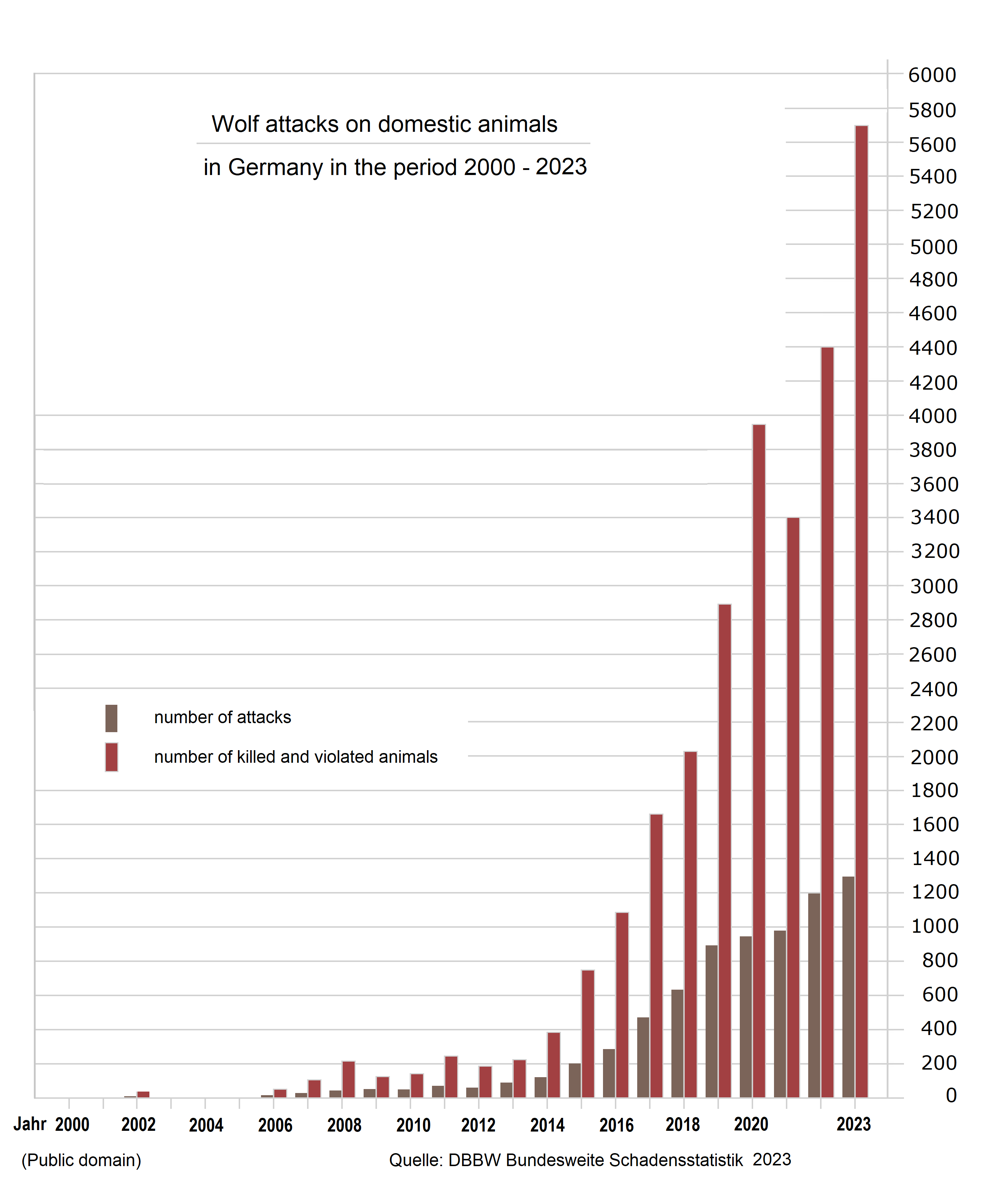
Wolf attacks on domestic animals (farm animals) in Germany

In Switzerland in 2021, 853 wolf attacks occurred in a population of 153 wolves in the presence of about 200 livestock guardian dogs. In Germany between 2000 and 2019, the number of wolf attacks on grazing animals increased from none to 890 in one year, while the number of animals injured and killed increased to 2900, indicating a specialisation in grazing animals and frequent surplus killing events.

In France, the number of animals captured in unprotected flocks decreased between 2010 and 2015 as more and more flocks were protected, but the number of animals killed in protected flocks increased. During this period the behaviour of the wolves changed in such a way that with increasing habituation the proportion of wolf attacks during the day increased. In 2018 there was an estimated loss of 12,500 farm animals caused by wolf attacks in the French Alpine arc, with a population of about 500 wolves and several thousand livestock guardian dogs. Despite new measures to protect herds, there were 3,838 sightings of wolves in 2019 in the Auvergne-Rhône-Alpes region and compensation was paid for 12,491 detected wolf attacks.

In some regions, livestock guardian dogs also became victims of wolves.

=== Attacks on humans ===
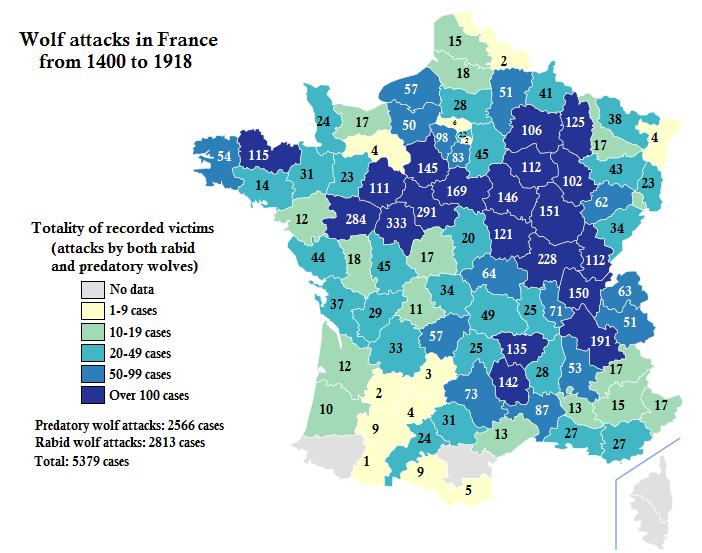
Map showing the number of wolf attacks in France by département from 1400 to 1918

According to documented data, man-eating (not rabid) wolves killed 111 people in Estonia in the years from 1804 to 1853, 108 of them were children, two men and one woman. Of the 108 children, 59 were boys aged 1 – 15 years (average age 7.3 years) and 47 girls aged 1 – 17 years (average age 7.2 years). For two children, sex and age were not specified." So in Estonia, 111 deaths were reported in about 50 years, with an average of two per year over a country area of 45,227 km^{2}, and with some injured people who survived a wolf attack. The wolves that immigrated to Central Europe come from this Baltic population. Due to the abundance of game and many grazing animals still living in species-appropriate free range management, the wolves in Europe are not yet interested in children as prey.

In France, historical records compiled by rural historian Jean-Marc Moriceau indicate that during the period 1362–1918, nearly 7,600 people were killed by wolves, of whom 4,600 were killed by nonrabid wolves. Numerous attacks occurred in Germany during the 17th century after the Thirty Years' War, though the majority probably involved rabid wolves. In Latvia, records of rabid wolf attacks go back two centuries. At least 72 people were bitten between 1992 and 2000. Similarly, in Lithuania, attacks by rabid wolves have continued to the present day, with 22 people having been bitten between 1989 and 2001. Around 82 people were bitten by rabid wolves in Estonia during the 18th to 19th centuries, with a further 136 people being killed in the same period by nonrabid wolves, though the animals likely involved in the latter cases were a combination of wolf-dog hybrids and escaped captive wolves.

Several Russian zoologists after the October Revolution cast doubt on the veracity of records involving wolf-caused deaths. Prominent among them was zoologist Petr Aleksandrovich Manteifel, who initially regarded all cases as either fiction or the work of rabid animals. His writings were widely accepted among Russian zoological circles, though he subsequently changed his stance when he was tasked with heading a special commission after World War II investigating wolf attacks throughout the Soviet Union, which had increased during the war years. A report presented in November 1947 described numerous attacks, including ones perpetrated by apparently healthy animals, and gave recommendations on how to better defend against them. The Soviet authorities prevented the document from reaching both the public and those who would otherwise be assigned to deal with the problem. All mention of wolf attacks was subsequently censored.

== Relationships with humans ==
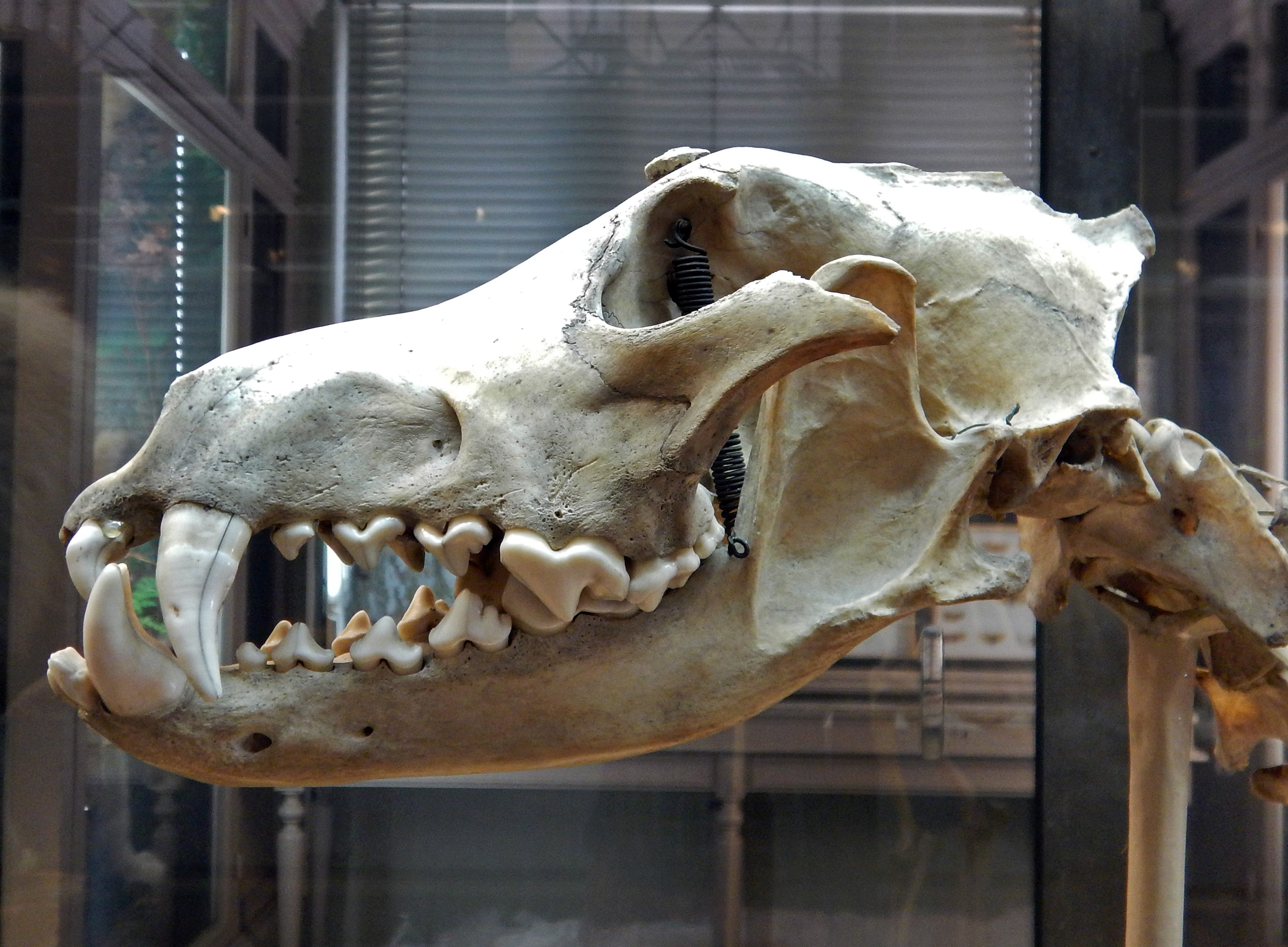
Skull of a Eurasian wolf at the Musée d'Histoire Naturelle de Lille, showing its powerful jaw and large fangs

Eurasian wolf pictured in the coat of arms of Järva

=== Myths ===
The majority of pre-Christian wolf-related traditions in Eurasia were rooted in Hittite mythology with wolves featuring prominently in Indo-European cultures, sometimes as deity figures. The wolf was held in high esteem by the Dacians, whose name was derived from the Gaulish Daoi, meaning "wolf people". The wolf was viewed as the lord of all animals and as the only effective power against evil. The ancient Greeks associated wolves with their plague-and-healing god Apollo.

Less flattering portrayals occurred in Norse mythology where the wolf Fenrir kills Odin during Ragnarok. Nevertheless, wolves were admired for their ferocity and Germanic warriors often had the wolf as their totem, a trait later exported to other European cultures. In Lithuanian mythology, an iron wolf appears before Grand Duke Gediminas instructing him to build the city of Vilnius. Tengrism places high importance on the wolf as when howling, it is thought to be praying to Tengri thus making it the only creature other than man to worship a deity.
