= Ilka Reinhardt =

German biologist

Ilka Reinhardt (born 1966 in the GDR) is a German biologist and wolf expert. She is together with Gesa Kluth Founder and director of LUPUS - Institute for Wolf Monitoring and Research in Germany and the Freundeskreis freilebender Wölfe. She was appointed by the Saxon State Ministry for the Environment and Agriculture as the wolf commissioner. Ilka Reinhardt works with the International Fund for Animal Welfare (IFAW) and Naturschutzbund Deutschland. In Poland, the biologist Sabina Nowak has a similar position. Ilka Reinhardt and Sabina Nowak are members of the Large Carnivore Initiative for Europe and cooperate with the CEWolf Consortium.

== Career ==
Growing up in Potsdam and Berlin, she first completed an apprenticeship as skilled worker for animal production. After the German reunification she studied biology and found her main interest in wildlife biology. She was involved in a bear project in Slovenia and worked on badgers in Switzerland. The topic of her diploma thesis is lynx occurrences in Slovenia. After her diploma she met Gesa Kluth in Berlin, with whom she founded the Wildbiologisches Büro LUPUS in Spreewitz in 2003. Like Sabina Nowak, Ilka Reinhardt became a member of the Large Carnivore Initiative for Europe (LCIE) under the chair Luigi Boitani. Together with Gesa Kluth, she supervised and promoted the re-immigration of wolves to Germany in accordance with his instructions. On behalf of the Bundesamt für Naturschutz, the two women played a key role in the development of the Standards for wolf monitoring for Germany. They conduct wolf monitoring training courses for interested parties from Germany and neighbouring countries.

== Lectures ==
In 2013 Ilka Reinhardt spoke as a speaker at the International Wolf Symposium at the Wolfcenter in Dörverden.

As a speaker at the NABU Wolf Conference 2015, she provided information on the conservation status of the wolf, population development and monitoring: "There is a constant debate about whether the wolf should be listed in Annex IV or V of the Habitats Directive. Founding countries of the EU have classified him in IV. That was easy, because these countries were virtually wolf-free. Countries that joined the EU later negotiated its inclusion in Annex V precisely because wolves were already present there. Animals are protected in Annex V, but legal hunting can be carried out under certain conditions. For example, wolves are hunted as an Annex V species in the Baltic States, but not in Poland. How the protection status is filled in is a matter for the country concerned" (Quote Ilka Reinhard).

== Selected publications ==
- Ilka Reinhardt, Gesa Kluth: Living with wolves - Guidelines for dealing with a conflict-prone species in Germany. 2007
- H. Ansorge, M. Holzapfel, G. Kluth, I. Reinhardt and C. Wagner: The Return of the Wolves. In: Biology of our time. Volume 40, 2010, pages 244-253.
- Ilka Reinhardt, Gesa Kluth, Sabina Nowak, Robert W. Mysłajek: A review of wolf management in Poland and Germany with recommendations for future transboundary collaboration 2013
- Ilka Reinhardt, Gesa Kluth: Wolves in Europe and Germany - Status, Distribution and Monitoring. LUPUS Institute for Wolf Monitoring and Research in Germany 2014.
- Ilka Reinhardt, Gesa Kluth, Sabina Nowak, Robert W. Mysłajek: Standards for the monitoring of the Central European wolf population in Germany and Poland 2015
- Ilka Reinhardt, Petra Kaczensky, Felix Knauer, Georg Rauer, Gesa Kluth, Sybille Wölfl, Ditmar Huckschlag, Ulrich Wotschikowsky: Monitoring of wolf, lynx and bear in Germany 2015.
- Ilka Reinhardt as co-author in: Luigi Boitani: Guidelines for management plans for large carnivores at population level
