= LUPUS - Institute for Wolf Monitoring and Research in Germany =

German research institute

LUPUS - Institute for Wolf Monitoring and Research in Germany is a research institute with its headquarters in Spreewitz. It was founded in January 2003 as Wildbiologisches Büro LUPUS by the biologists Gesa Kluth and Ilka Reinhardt and is managed by them until today (2019). Their main area of work is the scientific monitoring and research of the natural repopulation of Germany by the wolf. LUPUS works on behalf of the Saxon State Ministry for the Environment and Agriculture and is supported among others by the Bundesamt für Naturschutz, the Bundesforst, the Bundesanstalt für Immobilienaufgaben and the International Fund for Animal Welfare.

== Fields of activity ==
The Wildlife Biology Bureau LUPUS has, among others, on behalf of the Bundesamt für Naturschutz(BfN), developed the "Specialist concept for a wolf management in Germany". It organises and leads the wolf monitoring in Saxony and the south of Brandenburg as well as in Saxony-Anhalt.

The scientific work includes, among other things, the stocktaking, the trace monitoring, telemetry, and food analyses as well as genetic studies. Since 2003, wolves in the Lausitz have been equipped with collar transmitters to research territory use, lifestyle and dispersal. Since 2006 the migration behaviour of young wolves has been investigated in a pilot study financed by the Federal Agency for Nature Conservation using GPS/GSM telemetry. In January 2011 the project was extended to Saxony-Anhalt.

Furthermore, LUPUS together with other institutions is engaged in the professional education of the citizens. The integration of wolves into their living space and the acceptance of the people are supported. The counselling of affected people in agriculture, such as sheep breeders, and the visits to the citizens are intended to reduce the fear of wolves and enable "peaceful coexistence between wolves and humans" according to the ideas of the Large Carnivore Initiative for Europe.

== Reception ==
The work of LUPUS is regularly featured in the media. The return of the wolf is met with rejection by many farmers with grazing livestock and some hunters, which is also directed against the Institute's staff.

== Literature ==
- Ilka Reinhardt, Gesa Kluth: Living with wolves, guidelines for dealing with a conflict-prone species in Germany. BfN Scripts Volume 201, Federal Agency for Nature Conservation (BfN), Bonn 2007 (Online; PDF file; 3,3 MB).
- Petra Kaczensky, Gesa Kluth, Felix Knauer, Georg Rauer, Ilka Reinhardt, Ulrich Wotschikowsky: Monitoring of large carnivores in Germany Federal Agency for Nature Conservation (BfN), Bonn 2009 (online, PDF file, 1.47 MB)
- Gesa Kluth, Ilka Reinhardt: Living with wolves. Saxon State Ministry for Environment and Agriculture. 2011
  - 5th edition revised by Sebastian Koerner and contact office "Wolfsregion Lausitz", 2016 (online, PDF file, 7.5 MB).
- Ilka Reinhardt, Georg Rauer, Gesa Kluth, Petra Kaczensky, Felix Knauer, Ulrich Wotschikowsky: Livestock protection methods applicable for Germany - a Country newly recolonized by wolves. In Hystrix: The Italian Journal of Mammalogy. Vol 23, 2012, doi:10.4404/hystrix-23.1-4555 p. 62-72 (English, online, PDF file, 856 kB).
- Ilka Reinhardt, Gesa Kluth, Sabina Nowak, Robert W. Myslajek: A review of wolf management in Poland and Germany with recommendations for future transboundary collaboration. BfN-Skripten Volume 356. Bundesamt für Naturschutz (BfN), Bonn 2013 (English, online, PDF file, 5.57 MB).
- Ilka Reinhardt, Gesa Kluth, Sabina Nowak, Robert W. Myslajek: Standards for the monitoring of the Central European wolf population in Germany and Poland. BfN-Skripten Volume 398. Bundesamt für Naturschutz (BfN), Bonn 2015 (English, online, PDF file, 1.36 MB).
