= Sabina Nowak =

Polish scientist (born 1959)

Sabina Nowak (Polish pronunciation: [saˈbi.na nɔvak]; married name Pierużek-Nowak; born 6 June 1959) is a Polish scientist and wolf expert. She is president of the Association for Nature Wolf (AfN Wolf) and a member of the Large Carnivore Initiative for Europe.

== Life ==
In 1983, Nowak graduated from the University of Silesia in Katowice with a Master of Science degree in biology. In her doctoral thesis she described the "Ecology of Wolves". She has been taking care of the wolf in Poland since the mid-1990s. From 1993 to 1998 she coordinated the campaign "For the full protection of the large predators, wolf and lynx" in Poland and a campaign for the protection of the entire Polish part of the primeval forest Białowieża as a national park (Białowieża National Park). In 1998 she was elected to the Ashoka Fellowship. From 2001 to 2004 she was head of the Polish census of lynxes and wolves. Since 2000, she has been coordinating German-Polish cooperation on wolves with the German wolf experts Ilka Reinhardt and Gesa Kluth. From 2009 to 2016 she was a member of the Polish State Council for Nature Conservation, where she chaired the Animals Commission from 2014 to 2016.

2015 Sabina Nowak and Henryk Okarma were speakers at a conference in the Senate "The Future of the Wolf in Poland" concerning the fast growing wolf population in Poland.

== Publications ==
- National Strategy for Wolf Protection and Management. 1998
- Instructions for Livestock Owners - Methods for Livestock Protection against Wolf Attacks. 1999
- On the trail of the wolves. 2000
- Current report - Wolf and lynx censuses in Polish forests and national parks. 2001
- Sabina Nowak, Robert W. Mysłajek: Wolf Protection in Poland. The Wolf Conservation Association, Godziszka, 2002, ISBN 83-911331-7-6
- Sabina Nowak, Robert W. Mysłajek: Livestock Guarding Dogs in the Western Part of the Polish Carpathians
- Sabina Nowak, Robert W. Mysłajek, Bogumiła Jędrzejewska: Patterns of wolf Canis lupus predation on wild and domestic ungulates in the Western Carpathian Mountains (S Poland)
- Wlodzimierz Jedrzejewski, Sabina Nowak, Robert W. Mysłajek: Animals and roads. Methods of mitigating the negative impact of roads on wildlife
- Maciej Szewczyk, Sabina Nowak et al.: Dynamic range expansion leads to establishment of a new, genetically distinct wolf population in Central Europe
- Sabina Nowak, Robert Mysłajek: Wolves in Western Poland Distribution and Ecology of the Animal Species Faculty of Biology, University of Warsaw, 2017.
