= Gesa Kluth =

German biologist and wolf expert

Gesa Kluth (born 1970 near Göttingen) is a German biologist and wolf expert.

She studied biology in Bremen and in 1996 she worked with a wolf pack in Estonia as part of her diploma thesis. After spending some time in Brandenburg, she is currently living in Oberlausitz in Saxony, where the first free-living wolf packs in Germany have settled.

Gesa Kluth is regarded as a wolf expert in Germany. Together with her colleague Ilka Reinhardt she founded in January 2003 the today's LUPUS - Institute for Wolf Monitoring and Research in Germany in Spreewitz, north-west of the Military training area Oberlausitz, from where the re-spread of wolves in Germany took place. Gesa Kluth works together with the International Fund for Animal Welfare, the Naturschutzbund Deutschland and the Saxon State Ministry for Environment and Agriculture. In Poland, the Polish biologist Sabina Nowak has a similar position. She sees it as one of her tasks to cooperate with livestock farmers in the region. The aim is to protect farm animals without killing wild wolves. Gesa Kluth is co-author of many specialist publications by members of the Large Carnivore Initiative for Europe.

In 2003/2004 Gesa Kluth, Sebastian Körner and Ilka Reinhardt discovered a litter of hybrids in Lusatia which was to be taken from the wild. Only the mother animal and two of the young hybrids could be caught. The mother animal was released again. At that time, wolf experts in Germany and Poland were not aware that the allele at the agouti-locus is a recessive gene that can only be expressed in the phenotype if both parent animals are genetic carriers of the gene. Otherwise they would have kept the mother animal in captivity.
