= Conservation status =

Indication of the chance of extinction

The conservation status of a group of organisms (for example, a species) indicates whether the group still exists and how likely it is to become extinct in the near future. Many factors are taken into account when assessing conservation status—not simply the number of individuals remaining, but the overall increase or decrease in the population over time, breeding success rates, and known threats.

Various systems of conservation status are in use at international, multi-country, national and local levels, as well as for consumer use such as sustainable seafood advisory lists and certification. The two international systems are by the International Union for Conservation of Nature (IUCN) and The Convention on International Trade in Endangered Species of Wild Fauna and Flora (CITES).

== International systems ==
=== IUCN Red List of Threatened Species ===
The IUCN Red List of Threatened Species by the International Union for Conservation of Nature is the best known worldwide conservation status listing and ranking system. Species are classified by the IUCN Red List into nine groups set through criteria such as rate of decline, population size, area of geographic distribution, and degree of population and distribution fragmentation.

Also included are species that have gone extinct since 1500 CE. When discussing the IUCN Red List, the official term "threatened" is a grouping of three categories: critically endangered, endangered, and vulnerable.

- Extinct (EX) – There are no known living individuals
- Extinct in the wild (EW) – Known only to survive in captivity, or as a naturalized population outside its historic range
- Critically Endangered (CR) – Highest risk of extinction in the wild
- Endangered (EN) – Higher risk of extinction in the wild
- Vulnerable (VU) – High risk of extinction in the wild
- Near Threatened (NT) – Likely to become endangered in the near future
- Conservation Dependent (CD) – Low risk; is conserved to prevent being near threatened, certain events may lead it to being a higher risk level
- Least concern (LC) – Very low risk; does not qualify for a higher risk category and not likely to be threatened in the near future. Widespread and abundant taxa are included in this category.
- Data deficient (DD) – Not enough data to make an assessment of its risk of extinction
- Not evaluated (NE) – Has not yet been evaluated against the criteria.

=== The Convention on International Trade in Endangered Species of Wild Fauna and Flora ===
The Convention on International Trade in Endangered Species of Wild Fauna and Flora (CITES) went into force in 1975. It aims to ensure that international trade in specimens of wild animals and plants does not threaten their survival. Many countries require CITES permits when importing plants and animals listed on CITES.

== Multi-country systems ==
In the European Union (EU), the Birds Directive and Habitats Directive are the legal instruments which evaluate the conservation status within the EU of species and habitats.

NatureServe conservation status focuses on Latin America, the United States, Canada, and the Caribbean. It has been developed by scientists from NatureServe, The Nature Conservancy, and a network of natural heritage programs and data centers. It is increasingly integrated with the IUCN Red List system. Its categories for species include: presumed extinct (GX), possibly extinct (GH), critically imperiled (G1), imperiled (G2), vulnerable (G3), apparently secure (G4), and secure (G5). The system also allows ambiguous or uncertain ranks including inexact numeric ranks (e.g. G2?), and range ranks (e.g. G2G3) for when the exact rank is uncertain. NatureServe adds a qualifier for captive or cultivated only (C), which has a similar meaning to the IUCN Red List extinct in the wild (EW) status.

The Red Data Book of the Russian Federation is used within the Russian Federation, and also accepted in parts of Africa.

== National systems ==
In Australia, the Environment Protection and Biodiversity Conservation Act 1999 (EPBC Act) describes lists of threatened species, ecological communities and threatening processes. The categories resemble those of the 1994 IUCN Red List Categories & Criteria (version 2.3). Prior to the EPBC Act, a simpler classification system was used by the Endangered Species Protection Act 1992. Some state and territory governments also have their own systems for conservation status. The codes for the Western Australian conservation system are given at Declared Rare and Priority Flora List (abbreviated to DECF when using in a taxobox).

In Belgium, the Flemish Research Institute for Nature and Forest publishes an online set of more than 150 nature indicators in Dutch.

In Canada, the Committee on the Status of Endangered Wildlife in Canada (COSEWIC) is a group of experts that assesses and designates which wild species are in some danger of disappearing from Canada. Under the Species at Risk Act (SARA), it is up to the federal government, which is politically accountable, to legally protect species assessed by COSEWIC.

In China, the State, provinces and some counties have determined their key protected wildlife species. There is the China red data book.

In Finland, many species are protected under the Nature Conservation Act, and through the EU Habitats Directive and EU Birds Directive.

In Germany, the Federal Agency for Nature Conservation publishes "red lists of endangered species".

India has the Wild Life Protection Act, 1972, Amended 2003 and the Biological Diversity Act, 2002.

In Japan, the Ministry of Environment publishes a Threatened Wildlife of Japan Red Data Book.

In the Netherlands, the Dutch Ministry of Agriculture, Nature and Food Quality publishes a list of threatened species, and conservation is enforced by the Nature Conservation Act 1998. Species are also protected through the Wild Birds and Habitats Directives.

In New Zealand, the Department of Conservation publishes the New Zealand Threat Classification System lists. As of January 2008 threatened species or subspecies are assigned one of seven categories: Nationally Critical, Nationally Endangered, Nationally Vulnerable, Declining, Recovering, Relict, or Naturally Uncommon. While the classification looks only at a national level, many species are unique to New Zealand, and species which are secure overseas are noted as such.

In Russia, the Red Data Book of the Russian Federation came out in 2001, it contains categories defining preservation status for different species. In it there are 8 taxa of amphibians, 21 taxa of reptiles, 128 taxa of birds, and 74 taxa of mammals, in total 231. There are also more than 30 regional red books, for example the red book of the Altaic region which came out in 1994.

In South Africa, the South African National Biodiversity Institute, established under the National Environmental Management: Biodiversity Act, 2004, is responsible for drawing up lists of affected species, and monitoring compliance with CITES decisions. It is envisaged that previously diverse Red lists would be more easily kept current, both technically and financially.

In Thailand, the Wild Animal Reservation and Protection Act of BE 2535 defines fifteen reserved animal species and two classes of protected species, of which hunting, breeding, possession, and trade are prohibited or restricted by law. The National Park, Wildlife and Plant Conservation Department of the Ministry of Natural Resources and Environment is responsible for the regulation of these activities.

In Ukraine, the Ministry of Environment Protection maintains list of endangered species (divided into seven categories from "0" - extinct to "VI" - rehabilitated) and publishes it in the Red Book of Ukraine.

In the United States of America, the Endangered Species Act of 1973 created the Endangered Species List.

== Consumer guides ==
Some consumer guides for seafood, such as Seafood Watch, divide fish and other sea creatures into three categories, analogous to conservation status categories:

- Red ("say no" or "avoid")
- Yellow or orange ("think twice", "good alternatives" or "some concerns")
- Green ("best seafood choices")

The categories do not simply reflect the imperilment of individual species, but also consider the environmental impacts of how and where they are fished, such as through bycatch or ocean bottom trawlers. Often groups of species are assessed rather than individual species (e.g. squid, prawns).

The Marine Conservation Society has five levels of ratings for seafood species, as displayed on their FishOnline website.

== See also ==
- Conservation status of wolves in Europe
- Conservation biology
- Convention on the Conservation of Migratory Species of Wild Animals
- Lazarus taxon
- List of endangered species in North America
- Listing priority number
- Lists of extinct animals
- Lists of organisms by population
- Living Planet Index
- Red List Index
- Regional Red List
- Reintroduction
