= Henryk Okarma =

Polish biologist

Henryk Okarma (Polish pronunciation: [xɛnrɨk ɔkarma]; born 12 November 1959) is a Polish biologist, professor of life sciences. His main areas of expertise are research on predatory mammals, especially wolf, lynx, wildcat, invasive species and research on hunting biology. He is an academic teacher at the Jagiellonian University, long-time director of the Institute of Wildlife Conservation of the Polish Academy of Sciences and a corresponding member of the Polish Academy of Sciences.

== Biography ==
Okarma was born in Nysa and spent his childhood and youth in Nowy Sącz, where he obtained his university entrance qualification. In 1983 he graduated from the Jagiellonian University in Kraków. There he completed his doctoral studies, which ended in 1989 with a doctorate in Biology - Animal Ecology. From 1989 to 1996 he worked in the Department of Mammalian Research of the Polish Academy of Sciences in Białowieża. In 1996 he habilitated at the Faculty of Forestry of the University of Warsaw in the field of forest ecology in Forestry Sciences. From 1997 he worked at the Institute of Nature Conservation of the Polish Academy of Sciences in Kracow, until 2003 as an associate professor. In 2003 he received the title of professor of Biosciences. In the Institute of Nature Conservation of the Polish Academy of Sciences he leads a team for the ecology of large predators and was the director of the institute from 2002 to 2018. Since 2004 he has also been working in the Department of Hunting Research at the Institute of Environmental Sciences of the Jagiellonian University in Kraków. In 2013 he was elected a Corresponding Member of the Polish Academy of Sciences. He is a member of the Board of Trustees of the Faculty II of Bio- and Agricultural Sciences of PAN. Okarma speaks English, so Sven Herzog, in co-authorship with Okarma, could write the "Handbook Wolf" in German language, in which effective management plans are suggested.

== Publications ==
- Henryk Okarma: Wilk – monografia przyrodniczo-łowiecka. Białowieża 1992
- Henryk Okarma: Wilk. Wydawnictwo Lubuskiego Klubu Przyrodników, Świebodzin 1997
- Henryk Okarma: Der Wolf. Ökologie, Verhalten, Schutz. Parey Buchverlag, Berlin 1997
- P. Brzuski, Henryk Okarma: Wilk na terenach zachodniej Polski (The wolf in the area of western Poland). Polski Związek Łowiecki, Warszawa 1997
- Henryk Okarma, Wlodzimierz Jedrzejewski, Bogumiła Jędrzejewska, Sabina Nowak: Strategia ochrony i gospodarowania populaja wilka w Polsce. Kraków 1998
- Henryk Okarma: Le Loup en Europe. Grands Espaces, Orleans 1998
- Henryk Okarma: Ryś. Oficyna Edytorska "Wydawnictwo Świat", Warszawa 2000
- Henryk Okarma: De Wolf. Uitgeverij de Kei, Amersfoort, The Netherland 2000
- Henryk Okarma: Canis lupus Linne, 1758. Wilk. In: Z. Głowaciński (Hrsg.): Polnisches Rotes Buch der Tiere, Wirbeltiere. DWRiL 2001
- M. Wolsan, Henryk Okarma: Felis silvestris Schreber, 1775. Żbik. In: Z. Głowaciński (Hrsg.): Polnisches Rotes Buch der Tiere, Wirbeltiere. DWRiL 2001
- M. Wolsan, Henryk Okarma: Lynx (Felis) lynx (Linne, 1758). Ryś. In: Z. Głowaciński (Hrsg.): Polnisches Rotes Buch der Tiere, Wirbeltiere. DWRiL 2001
- Henryk Okarma, D. Langwald: Der Wolf. Parey Buchverlag, Berlin 2002
- Henryk Okarma, A. Tomek: Łowiectwo. Wydawnictwo H2O, Kraków 2008
- Henryk Okarma, K. Schmidt: Ryś. Wydawnictwo H2O, Kraków 2013
- Henryk Okarma: Wilk. Wydawnictwo H2O, Kraków 2015
- Henryk Okarma, Sven Herzog: Handbuch Wolf. Kosmos-Verlag, Stuttgart 2019.
