= Listing priority number =

A listing priority number is a United States Fish and Wildlife Service way of designating the relative priority of candidate species that the agency believes should be listed as threatened or endangered under the Endangered Species Act, but due to funding concerns, cannot be listed immediately on the United States Fish and Wildlife Service list of endangered mammals and birds.

Every candidate species is assigned a priority number from 1 to 12 based on factors such as the magnitude of threats facing the species, the immediacy of the threat and the species' taxonomic status. A lower priority number means that the species is under greater threat. For example, a number of 2 indicates a higher degree of concern than a number of 8.

The following table shows how the FWS determines listing priority numbers.

Threat Magnitude	Immediacy	Taxonomy	Priority Number
High	imminent	monotypic genus	1
High	imminent	species	2
High	imminent	subspecies/population	3
High	non-imminent	monotypic genus	4
High	non-imminent	species	5
High	non-imminent	subspecies/population	6
Moderate to low	imminent	monotypic genus	7
Moderate to low	imminent	species	8
Moderate to low	imminent	subspecies/population	9
Moderate to low	non-imminent	monotypic genus	10
Moderate to low	non-imminent	species	11
Moderate to low	non-imminent	subspecies/population	12
