= Luigi Boitani =

Italian biologist, writer, and television presenter (born 1946)

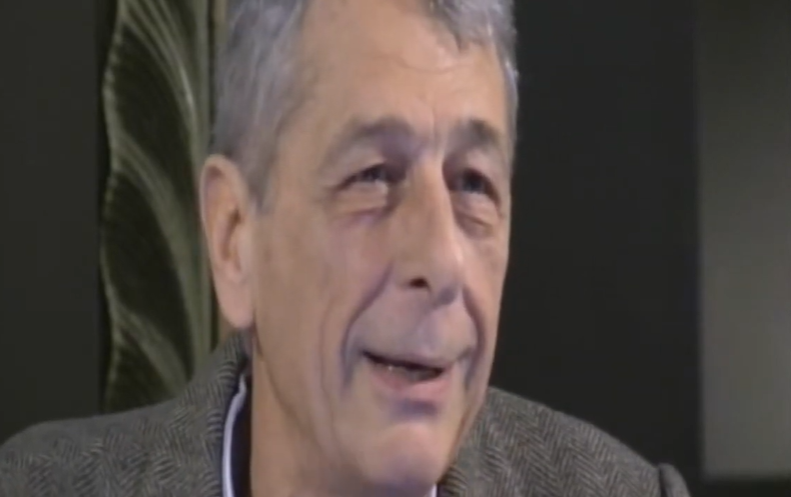
Luigi Boitani in 2014

Luigi Boitani (born April 2, 1946, in Rome) is a professor of zoology at the Sapienza University of Rome, whose research interests include ecology, the protection of large mammals, and the management of protected areas. Boitani is president of the Large Carnivore Initiative for Europe.

== Life and work ==
Boitani is a professor of conservation biology and animal ecology and was head of the Department of Zoology and Human Biology at the Sapienza University of Rome until it was merged with other departments in 2010 to form the Department of Biology and Biotechnology Charles Darwin.

Since 1973, he has devoted himself to the ecology and protection of wolves. He has developed more than 30 management plans for various national parks. Boitani is active in the Species Survival Commission of the World Conservation Union (IUCN) since 1996; he has been a member of its presidium since 2002; and chairman of its group of specialists of the Large Carnivore Initiative for Europe. He has worked in numerous IUCN specialist groups. In the Canid Specialist Group he is the coordinator of the Wolf in Europe working group. Together with L. David Mech, who was chairman of the IUCN Wolf Specialist Group from 1978 to 2013, Boitani published IUCN contributions on the subject of wolves, including the entry in the Red List. Several documents relevant to the European Commission on the management of large wild carnivores in Europe, in particular on wolf management, were produced under Boitani's leadership.

In 2023, he was elected a member of the Academia Europaea.

In addition to his scientific activities, he is dedicated to the publication of popular scientific articles on nature and nature conservation in books, magazines, and television programs. In 2014, Boitani signed a cooperation agreement between the Large Carnivore Initiative for Europe and Rewilding Europe. In addition, Boitani is one of the six members of the Foundation Segré.

== Books ==
- Luigi Boitani, Stefania Bartoli: The Macdonald Encyclopedia of Mammals. Little Brown GBR, 1986, ISBN 0-356-12422-3.
- L. David Mech, Luigi Boitani: Wolves: Behavior, Ecology and Conservation. University of Chicago Press, 2006, ISBN 0-226-51697-0.
- Luigi Boitani, Marco Musiani, Paul C. Paquet: World of Wolves – New Perspectives on Ecology, Behaviour, and Management – Energy, Ecology, and the Environment. University of Calgary Press, 2010, ISBN 978-1-55238-269-1.

== Other publications ==
- J. Linnell, V. Salvatori, L. Boitani: Guidelines for Population Level Management Plans for Large Carnivores. LCIE 2008 (Unautorisierte Übersetzung: Leitlinien für Managementpläne auf Populationsniveau für Großraubtiere.)
- Luigi Boitani: Action Plan for the conservation of the wolves (Canis lupus) in Europe. Straßburg / Oslo 2000.
- Manifesto: Declaration of Principles for Wolf Conservation by the Wolf Specialist Group of the Species Survival Commission of The World Conservation Union (IUCN).
- Luigi Boitani u. a.: Key actions for Large Carnivore populations in Europe. Brussels 2015.
- L. Boitani, P. Ciucci: Wolf Management across Europe: Species Conservation without Boundaries. 2009.
