= Large Carnivore Initiative for Europe =

The Large Carnivore Initiative for Europe (LCIE) is a working group of the IUCN Commission on the Conservation of Species. and a Non-governmental organization. President of the LCIE is the Secretary of the IUCN Wolf Specialist Group Luigi Boitani. Its objective is to maintain and restore viable populations of large carnivores in coexistence with humans as an integral part of ecosystems and landscapes throughout Europe.

== History ==
LCIE was founded in June 1995 by a coalition of scientists, land managers, government officials und conservation groups (leading among them WWF Europe) from 17 European countries. The cause for the founding of LCIE was the critical situation of the Iberian lynx, whose population had dwindled to less than 100 adult individuals and was considered to be close to extinction.

== Activities ==
LCIE works in an advisory role both on the European and national level.

LCIE has the crucial consultative role for the European Commission's Large Carnivores Unit and for the Standing Committee of the Bern Convention. The LCIE prepares the documents relevant for the EU as a basis for the national management plans for the large carnivores Eurasian wolf, Italian wolf, lynx, brown bear and wolverine in Europe. In addition, many of its members are involved in activities to reintroduce and protect these predator species, they perform key tasks in monitoring populations of lynx, brown bear and wolverine and in wolf monitoring, and they write or co-author publications.

The LCIE works together with the organisation Rewilding Europe.
