= 2020 Colorado elections =

Colorado state elections in 2020 were held on Tuesday, November 3, 2020. The deadline to register and receive a ballot by mail in Colorado was October 26, 2020. Voters may register in person and vote or pick up a ballot at Voter Service Centers October 19 through 7 p.m. November 3, 2020. Colorado exclusively used a vote-by-mail system, although voters may choose to vote in person at Voter Service and Polling Centers (VSPCs).

In addition to the U.S. presidential race, Colorado voters voted in the U.S. Senate, U.S. House, state executive offices, Colorado General Assembly, state supreme court, appellate courts, local judges, state ballot measures, and municipal elections.

== Federal elections ==
=== President of the United States ===
Colorado has nine electoral votes in the Electoral College. Nominees for the presidential election included Donald Trump, Joe Biden, and Jo Jorgensen. Joe Biden won the popular vote with 55%, winning nine pledged electoral votes.

=== United States Senate ===
Incumbent Republican Senator Cory Gardner sought reelection against Democratic former governor John Hickenlooper in the general election. John Hickenlooper won the election with 54% of the popular vote, making it a gain for the Democratic Party from the Republican Party.

=== United States House of Representatives ===
Coloradans voted for seven U.S. Representatives, one from each of the state's seven congressional districts. No seats changed hands, the Democrats winning four seats and the Republicans winning three seats.

U.S. House of Representatives nominees by district
District	Democratic nominee	Republican nominee	Independent nominee	Libertarian nominee	Unity nominee
District 1	Diana DeGette, incumbent	Shane Bolling			
District 2	Joe Neguse, incumbent	Charles Winn	Alex Johnson		
District 3	Diane Mitsch Bush	Lauren Boebert		John Ryan Keil	Critter Milton
District 4	Ike McCorkle	Ken Buck, incumbent			
District 5	Jillian Freeland	Doug Lamborn, incumbent			
District 6	Jason Crow, incumbent	Steve House		Norm Olsen	Jaimie Kulikowski
District 7	Ed Perlmutter, incumbent	Casper Stockham			

== State Board of Education ==
Three seats on the Colorado State Board of Education were up for election.

District	Party	Incumbent	Status	Party	Candidate	Votes	%
1	Democratic	Valentina Flores	not running	Democratic	Lisa Escárcega	326,818	73.25%
1	Democratic	Valentina Flores	not running	Republican	Sydnnia Wulff	104,204	23.36%
1	Democratic	Valentina Flores	not running	Libertarian	Alan Hayman	12,707	2.85%
1	Democratic	Valentina Flores	not running	Approval Voting	Zachary Laddison	2,405	0.54%
3	Republican	Joyce Rankin	running	Republican	Joyce Rankin	228,586	54.96%
3	Republican	Joyce Rankin	running	Democratic	Mayling Simpson	187,326	45.04%
7	Democratic	Jane Goff	term-limited	Democratic	Karla Esser	258,069	62.19%
7	Democratic	Jane Goff	term-limited	Republican	Nancy Pallozzi	156,890	37.81%

Source: Colorado Secretary of State

== CU Board of Regents ==
Three seats on the University of Colorado Board of Regents were up for election.

District	Party	Incumbent	Status	Party	Candidate	Votes	%
2	Democratic	Linda Shoemaker	not running	Democratic	Callie Rennison	297,440	59.59%
2	Democratic	Linda Shoemaker	not running	Republican	Dick Murphy	181,404	36.34%
2	Democratic	Linda Shoemaker	not running	Libertarian	Christian Vernaza	20,293	4.07%
6	Republican	John Carson	not running	Democratic	Ilana Spiegel	225,910	53.36%
6	Republican	John Carson	not running	Republican	Richard Murray	188,145	44.44%
6	Republican	John Carson	not running	Unity	Christopher Otwell	9,316	2.20%
7	Democratic	Irene Griego	term-limited	Democratic	Nolbert Chavez	297,965	100%

Source: Colorado Secretary of State

== General Assembly ==
18 out of 35 seats in the Colorado Senate and all 65 seats in the Colorado House of Representatives were up for election.

== State Judiciary ==
=== Supreme Court ===
Two justices on the Colorado Supreme Court had their terms expire on January 11, 2021, and their seats were up for retention.

==== Justice Hart retention ====
Results by county For: 50–60%; 60–70%; 70–80%; 80–90%

Justice Melissa Hart was appointed by governor Hickenlooper in 2017 to replace Allison Eid who was nominated by Donald Trump to the Tenth Circuit Appeals Court.

Colorado Supreme Court Justice Hart retention election
Choice	Votes	%
For	2,021,131	74.57
Against	689,375	25.43
Total	2,710,506	100.00
Source: Colorado Secretary of State

==== Justice Samour retention ====
Results by county For: 50–60%; 60–70%; 70–80%; 80–90%

Justice Carlos Samour was appointed by governor Hickenlooper in 2018 to replace outgoing Nancy Rice.

Colorado Supreme Court Justice Samour retention election
Choice	Votes	%
For	1,966,512	73.45
Against	710,863	26.55
Total	2,677,375	100.00
Source: Colorado Secretary of State

=== Court of Appeals ===
Two Colorado Court of Appeals judges had their terms expire on January 11, 2021, and their seats were up for retention.

==== Judge Tow retention ====
Results by county For: 50–60%; 60–70%; 70–80%; 80–90%

Judge Ted Tow was appointed by governor Hickenlooper in 2018 to replace outgoing Dennis Graham.

Colorado Court of Appeals Judge Tow retention election
Choice	Votes	%
For	1,874,419	70.79
Against	773,366	29.21
Total	2,647,785	100.00
Source: Colorado Secretary of State

==== Judge Welling retention ====
Results by county For: 50–60%; 60–70%; 70–80%; 80–90%

Judge Craig Welling was appointed by governor Hickenlooper in 2017 to replace outgoing Gale Miller.

Colorado Court of Appeals Judge Welling retention election
Choice	Votes	%
For	1,851,374	70.08
Against	790,501	29.92
Total	2,641,875	100.00
Source: Colorado Secretary of State

== Ballot measures ==
Eleven statewide measures appeared on the ballot in 2020.

=== Polling ===
Amendment B

Poll source	Date(s) administered	Sample size (Note: Key: A – all adults RV – registered voters LV – likely voters V – unclear)	Margin of error	For Amendment B	Against Amendment B	Undecided
YouGov/University of Colorado	October 5–9, 2020	400 (LV) (Note: Respondents polled with the ballot measure's wording)	–	44%	20%	36%
YouGov/University of Colorado	October 5–9, 2020	400 (LV) (Note: Respondents polled with a simple description of the ballot measure)	–	24%	23%	53%
SurveyUSA/9News/Colorado Politics	October 1–6, 2020	1,021 (LV)	± 3.9%	22%	17%	61%

Proposition 113

Poll source	Date(s) administered	Sample size	Margin of error	For Proposition 113	Against Proposition 113	Undecided
Civiqs/Daily Kos	October 11–14, 2020	1,013 (LV)	± 3.6%	47%	45%	8%
YouGov/University of Colorado	October 5–9, 2020	800 (LV)	± 4.64%	49%	34%	17%
SurveyUSA/9News/Colorado Politics	October 1–6, 2020	1,021 (LV)	± 3.9%	39%	38%	23%

Proposition 114

Poll source	Date(s) administered	Sample size	Margin of error	For Proposition 114	Against Proposition 114
Colorado State University/Qualtrics/Colorado Sun	August, 2019	734 (A)	± 7%	84%	16%

Proposition 115

Poll source	Date(s) administered	Sample size	Margin of error	For Proposition 115	Against Proposition 115	Undecided
Keating Research/Onsight Public Affairs/Colorado Sun	October 29 – November 1, 2020	502 (LV) (Note: Additional data sourced from FiveThirtyEight)	± 4.4%	38%	56%	–
Civiqs/Daily Kos	October 11–14, 2020	1,013 (LV)	± 3.6%	42%	51%	7%
YouGov/University of Colorado	October 5–9, 2020	800 (LV)	± 4.64%	41%	45%	14%
SurveyUSA/9News/Colorado Politics	October 1–6, 2020	1,021 (LV)	± 3.9%	42%	45%	13%

Proposition 116

Poll source	Date(s) administered	Sample size	Margin of error	For Proposition 116	Against Proposition 116	Undecided
Civiqs/Daily Kos	October 11–14, 2020	1,013 (LV)	± 3.6%	51%	35%	14%

Proposition 118

Poll source	Date(s) administered	Sample size	Margin of error	For Proposition 118	Against Proposition 118	Undecided
YouGov/University of Colorado	October 5–9, 2020	800 (LV)	± 4.64%	65%	22%	13%
SurveyUSA/9News/Colorado Politics	October 1–6, 2020	1,021 (LV)	± 3.9%	57%	21%	22%

==== Results ====
2020 Colorado ballot measures
Name	Description	Votes				Type
Name	Description	Yes	%	No	%	Type
Amendment B	Repeals the Gallagher Amendment and allows the state legislature to make changes to the property tax assessment rates.	1,740,395	57.52	1,285,136	42.48	Legislatively referred constitutional amendment
Amendment C	Lowers the number of years an organization must exist before obtaining a charitable gaming license and allows those organizations to hire managers and operators of gaming activities on minimum wage.	1,586,973	52.35	1,444,553	47.65 (Note: With the passage of Amendment 71 (2016), constitutional amendments require 55% of the vote in order to pass.)	Legislatively referred constitutional amendment
Amendment 76	Amends the state constitution to state that “only a citizen” of the U.S. who is 18 years old or older can vote in federal, state, and local elections.	1,985,239	62.90	1,171,137	37.10	Citizen-initiated constitutional amendment
Amendment 77	Allows voters in Central City, Black Hawk, and Cripple Creek to vote to expand allowed gaming types and bet limits.	1,854,153	60.54	1,208,414	39.46	Combined initiated constitutional amendment and state statute
Proposition EE	Increases taxes on tobacco, creates a new tax on nicotine products such as e-cigarettes, and dedicates those funds to education and health programs.	2,134,608	67.56	1,025,182	32.44	Legislatively referred state statute
Proposition 113	Joins Colorado into the National Popular Vote Interstate Compact, awarding Colorado's electoral votes to the winner of the national popular vote.	1,644,716	52.33	1,498,500	47.67	Veto referendum
Proposition 114	Reintroduces gray wolves on public lands.	1,590,299	50.91	1,533,313	49.09	Citizen-initiated state statute
Proposition 115	Prohibits most abortions after 22 weeks gestational age.	1,292,787	41.01	1,859,479	58.99	Citizen-initiated state statute
Proposition 116	Decreases the state income tax rate from 4.63% to 4.55%.	1,821,702	57.86	1,327,025	42.14	Citizen-initiated state statute
Proposition 117	Requires voter approval of new enterprises that are exempt from TABOR if their revenue is greater than $50 million within its first five years.	1,573,114	52.55	1,420,445	47.45	Citizen-initiated state statute
Proposition 118	Establishes a program for paid medical and family leave.	1,804,546	57.75	1,320,386	42.25	Citizen-initiated state statute
Source: Colorado Secretary of State

Results by county

Amendment B results by county
Yes:
- 70–80%
- 60–70%
- 50–60%
No:
- 60–70%
- 50–60%

Amendment C results by county
Yes:
- 60–70%
- 50–60%
No:
- 60–70%
- 50–60%

Amendment 76 results by county
Yes:
- >90%
- 80–90%
- 70–80%
- 60–70%
- 50–60%
No:
- 50–60%

Amendment 77 results by county
Yes:
- 70–80%
- 60–70%
- 50–60%
No:
- 50–60%

Proposition EE results by county
Yes:
- 80–90%
- 70–80%
- 60–70%
- 50–60%
No:
- 70–80%
- 60–70%
- 50–60%

Proposition 113 results by county
Yes:
- 70–80%
- 60–70%
- 50–60%
No:
- 80–90%
- 70–80%
- 60–70%
- 50–60%

Proposition 114 results by county
Yes:
- 60–70%
- 50–60%
No:
- 80–90%
- 70–80%
- 60–70%
- 50–60%

Proposition 115 results by county
No:
- 70–80%
- 60–70%
- 50–60%
Yes:
- 70–80%
- 60–70%
- 50–60%

Proposition 116 results by county
Yes:
- 70–80%
- 60–70%
- 50–60%
No:
- 60–70%
- 50–60%

Proposition 117 results by county
Yes:
- 60–70%
- 50–60%
No:
- 60–70%
- 50–60%

Proposition 118 results by county
Yes:
- 70–80%
- 60–70%
- 50–60%
No:
- 70–80%
- 60–70%
- 50–60%

== See also ==
- Politics of Colorado
  - Colorado Democratic Party
  - Colorado Republican Party
  - Political party strength in Colorado
- Elections in Colorado
- Bilingual elections requirement for Colorado (per Voting Rights Act Amendments of 2006)
- Government of Colorado
