= Colorado Western Slope =

Geographic region of the U.S. state of Colorado

- Region
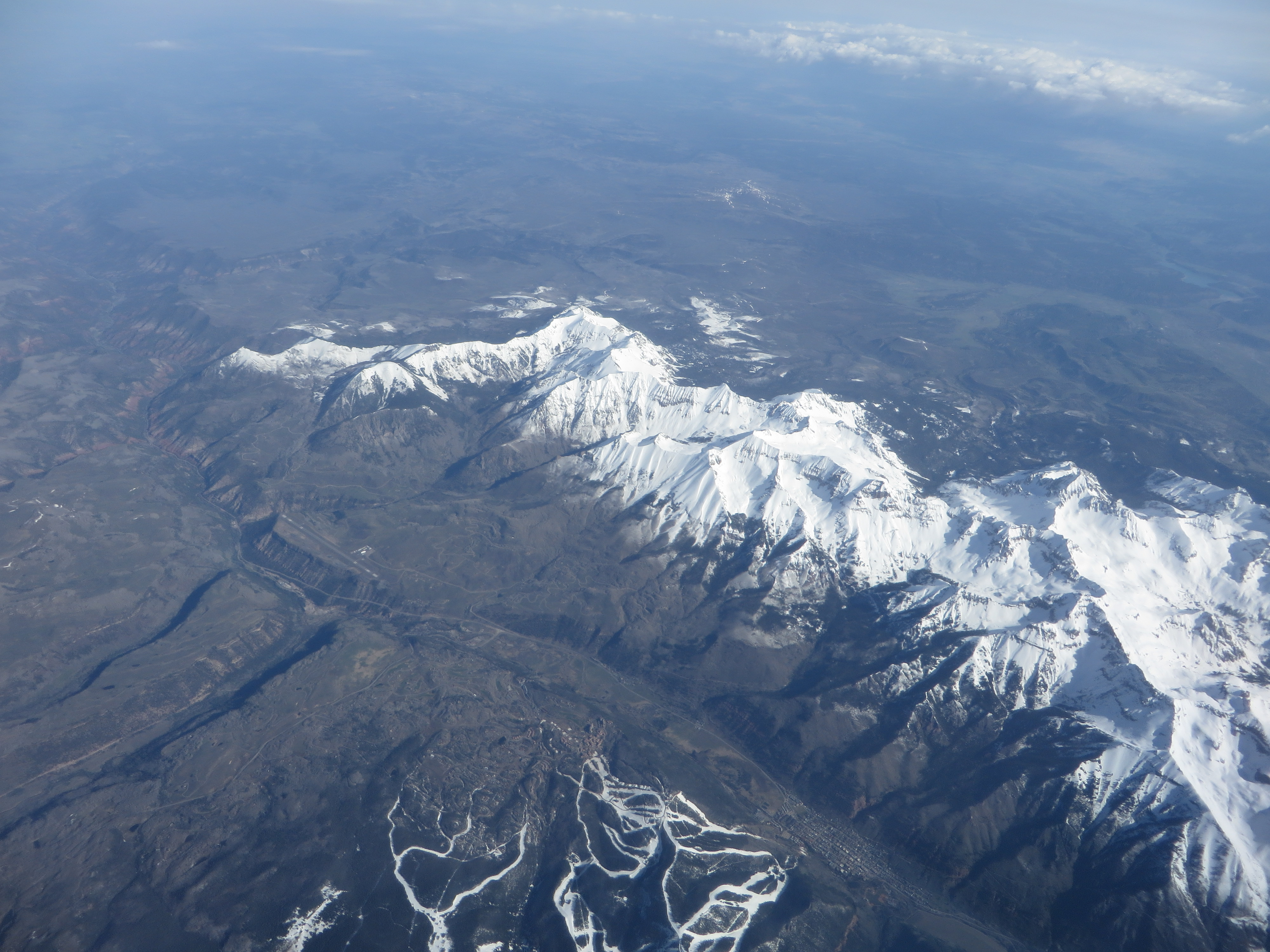
- San Juan Mountains North of Telluride, Colorado, in the Western Slope

- Location within Colorado
- Coordinates: 38°28′41.16″N 107°52′33.96″W
- Location: West of the Continental Divide in Colorado
- Range: Rocky Mountains

The Western Slope is a colloquial term generally understood to describe the part of the state of Colorado west of the Continental Divide. Bodies of water west of the Divide flow toward the Pacific Ocean; water that falls and flows east of the Divide heads east toward the Gulf of Mexico. The Western Slope encompasses about 33% of the state, but has just 10% of the state's residents. The eastern part of the state, including the San Luis Valley and the Front Range, is the more populous portion of the state.

== Location ==
Map of Colorado counties

The Western Slope, though without an official definition, generally is understood to include Delta, Dolores, Eagle, Garfield, Grand, Gunnison, Hinsdale, La Plata, Mesa, Moffat, Montezuma, Montrose, Ouray, Pitkin, Rio Blanco, Routt, San Juan, San Miguel, and Summit counties and portions of Archuleta, Mineral, and Saguache counties.

The Western Slope has about 70% of the state's water. The Colorado River and its tributaries divide the region into north and south at Grand Junction, Colorado. The area has a climate similar to that of the Great Basin.

== History ==
=== Prehistory ===
Paleo-Indians, early nomadic hunter-gatherers, followed large game throughout the Western Slope beginning about 12,000 BCE according to archaeological evidence found at the Mountaineer Archaeological Site near Gunnison, Colorado. Ancestral Puebloans inhabited the Gunnison and Colorado River basins between 6500 BCE and 200 CE. From about 350 BCE to 1300 CE, the Ancestral Puebloans lived in southwestern Colorado, including what is now Mesa Verde National Park. The Puebloans, while also continuing to hunt and gather food, were the first to farm and irrigate crops on the Western Slope. They left the area in the late 13th century, following a period of extensive drought.

The Ute people came to the Western Slope from the Great Basin and ranged through the area beginning about 1300. Their way of life, known as the Mountain Tradition, relied on hunting mule deer, elk, rabbits, and bison. They also gathered berries, roots, nuts and seeds. They frequented the area's hot springs, including the areas of Pagosa Springs, Glenwood Springs, and Steamboat Springs, Colorado. Many of the trails established by the Utes became routes for roads, stage lines, highways, and railways.

=== European contact ===
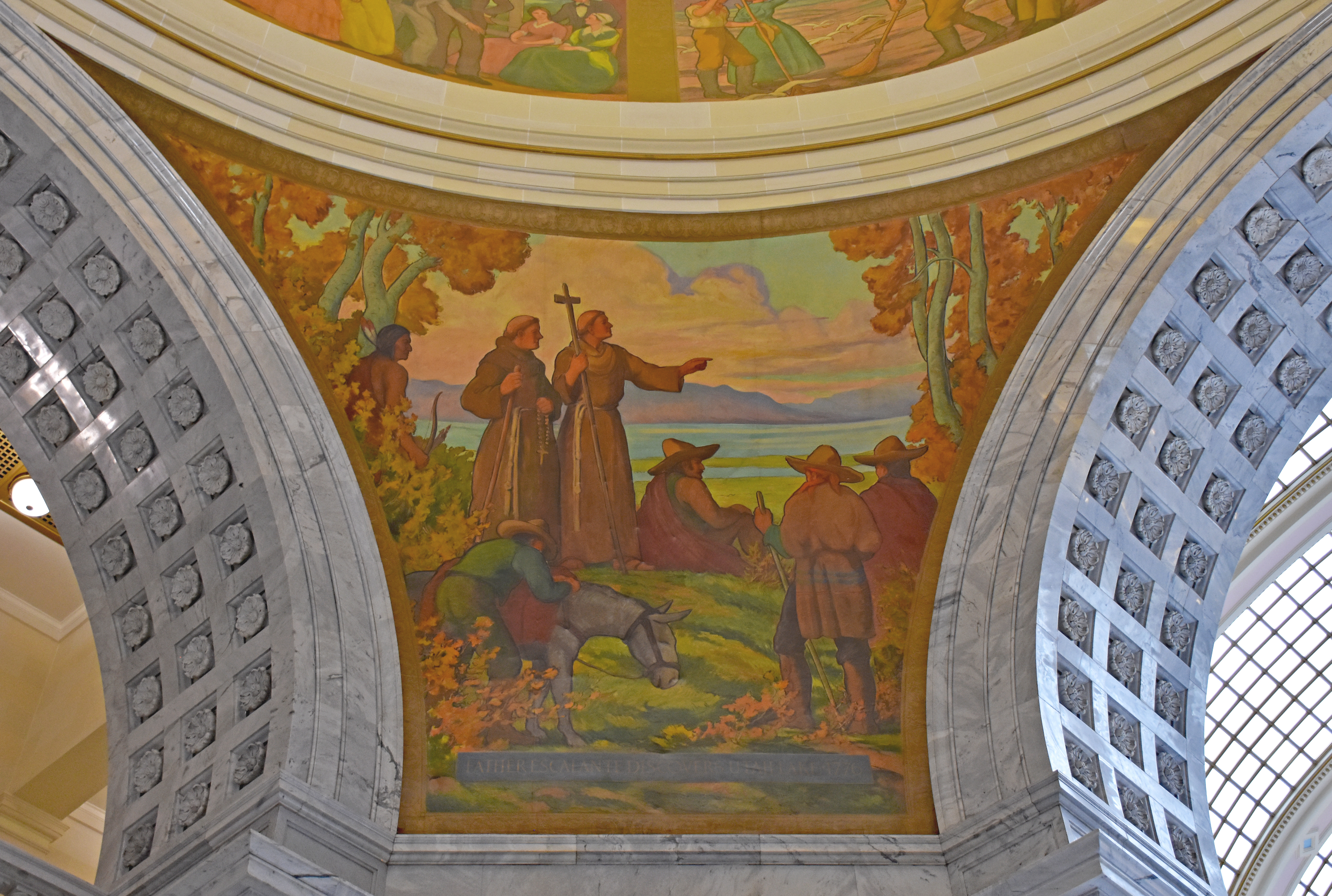
Painting of the Domínguez–Escalante expedition displayed in the Utah State Capitol building

Spanish explorers visited the Western Slope in the 18th century. Juan de Rivera explored the area in 1765, followed in 1776 by the Domínguez–Escalante expedition. Fur trappers, also called mountain men, of European descent entered the area to trap beaver for their furs. Trading posts were established on the Western Slope beginning in 1828 with the Fort Uncompahgre and Fort Davy Crockett at the center for trapping furs at Brown's Hole. The trading posts were used to trade furs for supplies or goods. Trappers and explorers include Kit Carson and Jim Bridger. They and others guided John C. Frémont (1843–53), John W. Gunnison (1853), and John Wesley Powell (1869) on their expeditions into the Western Slope. Once the demand for beaver furs declined and beaver had been over-trapped, the fur trade was greatly diminished.

In 1858 and 1859, the Gold Rush into Colorado brought miners into the region and mining towns like Breckenridge. Mining districts were established in the San Juan Mountains, Gunnison River Valley, Sawatch Mountains and Elk Mountains. The initial interest was panning for gold in rivers and that grew over the decades to including mining for ore, coal, and fuel below ground. Many mining towns were established in the Western Slope. Ferdinand Vandeveer Hayden's expedition of 1872 to 1873 resulted in maps of the Western Slope that were later used by investors, mining engineers, railroad owners, and others leading the western expansion into western Colorado.

After contact with European colonizers, there were a number of treaties to define boundaries for Native Americans, including the Treaty of 1868 that resulted in the Utes relinquishing their land east of the Continental Divide. They maintained most of their land in the Western Slope with the treaty. The Utes were pushed out of much of the Western Slope after gold was found in the San Juan Mountains, including through the Brunot Agreement. Utes were removed from the state after the Meeker Massacre of 1879. A reservation was created in Utah for the tribes that participated in the massacre. The Southern and Ute Mountain Utes have land in southern Colorado, the Southern Ute Indian Reservation and the Ute Mountain Ute Tribe Reservation.

The region has a rich heritage in farming and ranching, with agribusiness remaining a key industry for most of the western slope. It is historically an energy hub, with coal, oil, uranium, and natural gas production.

== Population ==
The Western Slope region is sparsely populated, containing 38% of Colorado's area but only 10.7% of its population. The region had a population of 563,138 in July 2013, an increase of 0.6% on the previous year, and had a low growth rate over the previous three years compared to the rest of the state.

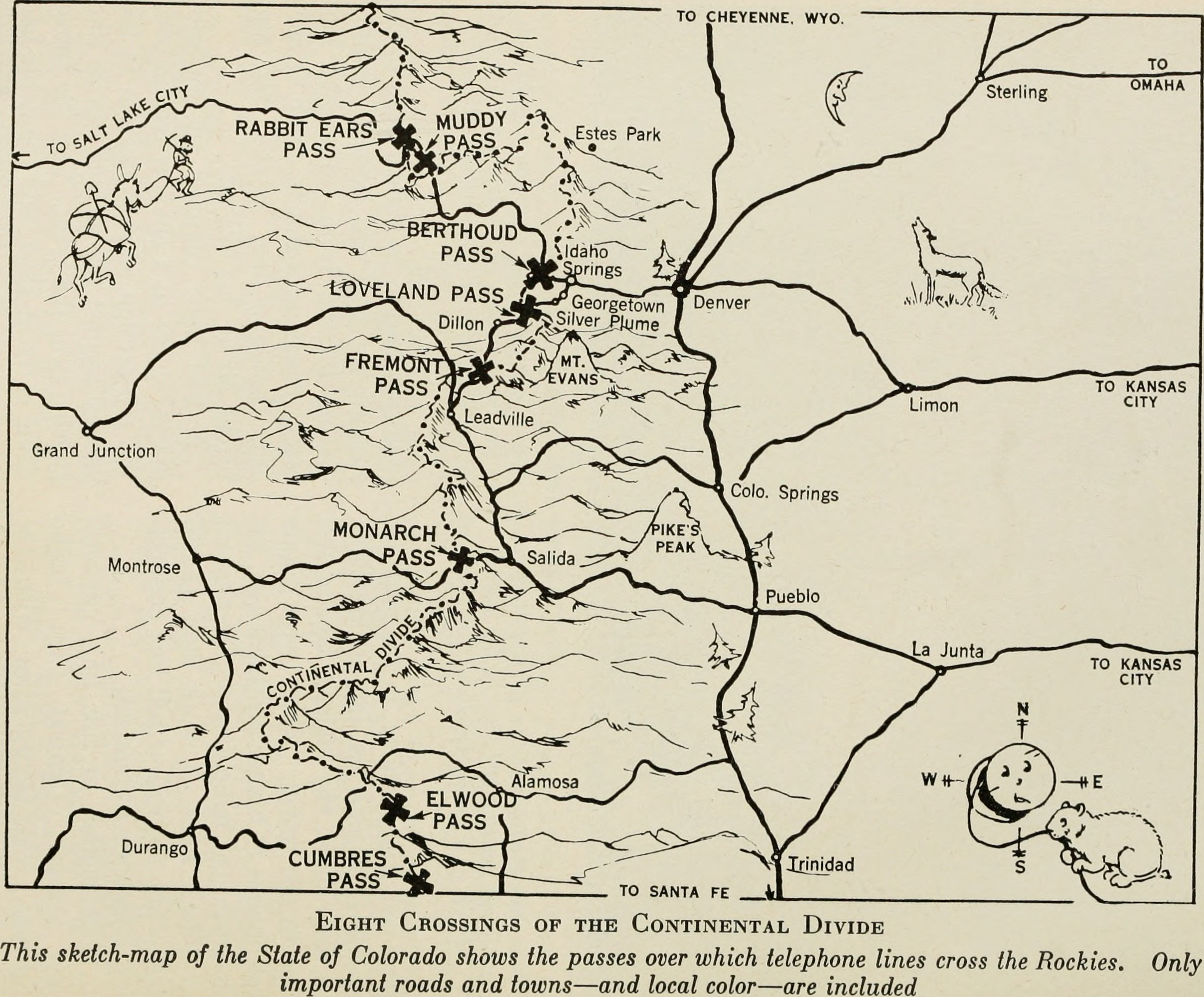
The Western Slope is west of the Continental Divide, including Durango, Grand Junction, and Montrose

The most populated areas of the Western slope are the Tri County area, which contains Grand Junction, Montrose, and Delta, and the Intermountain area, containing Glenwood Springs, Aspen, and Vail. Grand Junction is the largest city between Denver, Colorado, and Salt Lake City, Utah, with a population of 61,881 (2016, US Census Bureau).

According to the State Demographer's Office, the population of the Western Slope is estimated to grow by two-thirds by 2050. Mesa County is expected to grow to 236,554 residents, accounting for 25% of the population growth on the Western Slope and become the 10th most populous county in the state. In 2015, the total population on the Western Slope was 563,766 and is projected to increase 67.2% to 942,463 residents in 2050.

== Economy ==
Economic activity has primarily centered around ranching, mining, and tourism. Fruit farming is also prevalent in areas along the Colorado and Gunnison rivers, including the Grand Valley, where the Town of Palisade is recognized as the center of Colorado Wine Country, with over 20 wineries, and purveyor of Palisade peaches.

Much of the area's economy continues to be dependent upon energy extraction services and tourism. The region contains plentiful sources of oil, natural gas, uranium, and coal. Although much of the area's economy is still dominated by energy extraction services and tourism, the Grand Junction area's most prominent economic sector is health care. Grand Junction and surrounding Mesa County is a regional healthcare hub serving approximately 11 counties in Colorado, Utah and Wyoming, which includes more than 500,000 people.

== Education ==
Colorado's Western Slope is home to several colleges and universities:

=== Community/technical colleges ===
- Colorado Mountain College (multiple campuses)
- Colorado Northwestern Community College (Rangely)
- IntelliTec College (Grand Junction)

=== Four-year colleges/universities ===
- Colorado Mesa University (Grand Junction)
- Fort Lewis College (Durango)
- Western Colorado University (Gunnison)

== Tourism ==
The Western Slope has climate zones that include the desert, mountains, mountain lakes, and river valleys. As a result there are a number of outdoor recreational options that may include rock climbing, hiking, skiing, horseback riding and other activities. Crested Butte, Aspen, Telluride, and Vail are skiing areas. National forests include White River National Forest, Grand Mesa National Forest, Gunnison National Forest, Uncompahgre National Forest, and the San Juan National Forest. Black Canyon is in the Gunnison National Park.

Glenwood Springs has the world's largest hot springs pool, fairy caves, and whitewater rafting. Events in Aspen include the Aspen Musical Festival, the Wine and Food Classic, and Theatre Aspen. Vineyards and wineries are found in Palisade and Grand Junction. Mesa Verde National Park is the home of cliff-dwellings of the Ancient Puebloans. Dinosaur National Monument and Colorado National Monument are other areas of interest. Two of the many rivers of the Western Slope are the Colorado River and Crystal River.

== Fauna ==
Voters narrowly approved a November 2020 ballot measure that directed the commission that oversees CPW to develop a plan to begin to reintroduce wolves by the end of 2023 on the Western Slope. The wolves are managed and designated as a non-game species, meaning they cannot be hunted, with fair compensation being offered for livestock killed by the predators. Passage of the referendum was opposed by many cattle ranchers, elk hunters, farmers and others in rural areas that argue wolf reintroduction is bad policy which will threaten the raising of livestock and a $1 billion hunting industry.
