= 2026 University of Colorado Board of Regents election =

3 of 9 seats on the University of Colorado Board of Regents 5 seats needed for a majority
Party	Democratic	Republican
Current seats	5	3
Seats needed	Steady	▲1
Incumbent Chair
Ken Montera
Republican

The 2026 University of Colorado Board of Regents election was held on November 3, 2026, to elect three members to the University of Colorado Board of Regents. Primary elections were held on June 30.

== District 2 ==
=== Democratic primary ===
At the 2026 assembly, Kristopher Larsen failed to achieve 30% of the assembly vote, so he did not qualify for the ballot.

==== Candidates ====
===== Nominee =====
- Edie Hooton, former state representative from the 10th district (2017–2023)

==== Eliminated in primary ====
- Kubs Lalchandani, attorney
- Murray Smith, data scientist

===== Eliminated at convention =====
- Kristopher Larsen, former mayor of Nederland

===== Declined =====
- Callie Rennison, incumbent board member

==== Results ====
Primary results by county: Hooton: 30–40%; 40–50%; Smith: 30–40%; 40–50%

Democratic primary
Party	Candidate	Votes	%
Democratic	Edie Hooton	50,556	40.2
Democratic	Murray Smith	38,791	30.8
Democratic	Kubs Lalchandani	36,439	29.0
Total votes		125,786	100.0

=== Republican primary ===
==== Candidates ====
===== Nominee =====
- Marty Neilson

==== Results ====
Republican primary
Party	Candidate	Votes	%
Republican	Marty Neilson	33,888	100.0
Total votes		33,888	100.0

=== General election ===
==== Results ====
2026 University of Colorado's 2nd Board of Regents district election
Party	Candidate	Votes	%
Democratic	Edie Hooton		
Republican	Marty Neilson		
Libertarian	Richard Friend		
Total votes			100.00

== District 6 ==
=== Democratic primary ===
==== Candidates ====
===== Nominee =====
- Ilana Spiegel, incumbent board member

==== Results ====
Democratic primary
Party	Candidate	Votes	%
Democratic	Ilana Spiegel (incumbent)	86,948	100.0
Total votes		86,948	100.0

=== Republican primary ===
==== Candidates ====
===== Nominee =====
- Veanessa Burbage

==== Results ====
Republican primary
Party	Candidate	Votes	%
Republican	Veanessa Burbage	39,367	100.0
Total votes		39,367	100.0

=== General election ===
==== Results ====
2026 University of Colorado's 6th Board of Regents district election
Party	Candidate	Votes	%
Democratic	Ilana Spiegel (incumbent)		
Republican	Veanessa Burbage		
Libertarian	Joe Johnson		
Total votes			100.00

== District 7 ==
=== Democratic primary ===
==== Candidates ====
===== Nominee =====
- Nolbert Chavez, incumbent board member

==== Results ====
Democratic primary
Party	Candidate	Votes	%
Democratic	Nolbert Chavez (incumbent)	104,211	100.0
Total votes		104,211	100.0

=== Republican primary ===
==== Candidates ====
===== Nominee =====
- Paul Mueller

==== Eliminated in primary ====
- Joan Poston

==== Results ====
Primary results by county: Mueller: 50–60%; 60–70%; 70–80%

Republican primary
Party	Candidate	Votes	%
Republican	Paul Mueller	37,258	60.9
Republican	Joan Poston	23,884	39.1
Total votes		61,142	100.0

=== General election ===
==== Results ====
2026 University of Colorado's 7th Board of Regents district election
Party	Candidate	Votes	%
Democratic	Nolbert Chavez (incumbent)		
Republican	Paul Mueller		
Libertarian	BetteRose Ryan		
Total votes			100.00
