= 2020 Colorado Proposition 115 =

Referendum restricting abortion access

- November 3, 2020
- Prohibition on Late-Term Abortions

Results
Choice	Votes	%
Yes	1,292,787	41.01%
No	1,859,479	58.99%
Valid votes	3,152,266	95.65%
Invalid or blank votes	143,400	4.35%
Total votes	3,295,666	100.00%

No
70–80%
60–70%
50–60%
Yes
70–80%
60–70%
50–60%

Colorado Proposition 115, also known as the 22 Week Abortion Ban Initiative, was an initiated state statute referendum that appeared on the ballot in the U.S. state of Colorado on November 3, 2020. The measure would have prohibited abortions in Colorado beyond 22 weeks, around the average point of fetal viability, except in cases to protect the life of the mother. Abortion access was already federally protected in Colorado to the point of fetal viability due to the 1973 Supreme Court decision in Roe v. Wade. It was rejected by 59% of voters.

Proposition 115 was the fourth referendum since 2008 in Colorado that asked voters to prohibit abortions or redefine personhood.

== Background ==
Abortion was decriminalized in Colorado in 1967. Prior to the consideration of Proposition 115, Colorado had broad protections for abortion access, with no legally defined limit at any point during pregnancy. In 1973, the United States Supreme Court issued a decision in Roe v. Wade, codifying protections for abortion nationally through the first trimester as well as in most cases during the second trimester. Proposition 115 would restrict the right to an abortion in Colorado after 22 weeks unless the life of the mother was in danger, towards the end of the second trimester. Colorado was one of seven states without any restrictions on reproductive healthcare, including abortions.

On June 8, 2020, the Colorado Secretary of State confirmed the measure would appear on the ballot in 2020 as Initiative 120, also referred to as "Prohibition on Late-Term Abortion." Despite originally being approved as Initiative 120, it appeared on the ballot as Proposition 115 in November.

== Text ==
Proposition 115 appeared on the ballot in November 2020 as follows:

Shall there be a change to the Colorado Revised Statutes concerning prohibiting an abortion when the probable gestational age of the fetus is at least twenty-two weeks, and, in connection therewith, making it a misdemeanor punishable by a fine to perform or attempt to perform a prohibited abortion, except when the abortion is immediately required to save the life of the pregnant woman when her life is physically threatened, but not solely by a psychological or emotional condition; defining terms related to the measure including “probable gestational age” and “abortion,” and excepting from the definition of “abortion” medical procedures relating to miscarriage or ectopic pregnancy; specifying that a woman on whom an abortion is performed may not be charged with a crime in relation to a prohibited abortion; and requiring the Colorado medical board to suspend for at least three years the license of a licensee whom the board finds performed or attempted to perform a prohibited abortion?

— Proposition 115

== Campaign ==
In the 2020 Colorado Blue Book, which is a legislatively sponsored information booklet about ballot measures, an argument was made in favor of passing Proposition 115 in which it argued that it was a reasonable measure that would protect the life of an infant who could potentially survive outside of the womb and did not penalize women even if they received an abortion that would be prohibited under the law. An argument in opposition to Proposition 115 was also provided, arguing that it harmed bodily autonomy and did not provide any exceptions after 22 weeks for rape, incest, or serious birth defects.

The Denver Gazette endorsed Proposition 115, arguing that it was a chance to find "common ground" with the pro-choice and pro-life sides and that would protect both women and babies. The primary group in support of Proposition 115, Due Date Too Late, referred to the measure as "balanced and reasonable."

The American Civil Liberties Union publicly opposed Proposition 115, declaring that it would harm families and prohibit doctors from giving "compassionate abortion care." The Interfaith Alliance released a letter in opposition to Proposition 115 with 125 religious leaders and officials coming out in opposition to the measure.

== Endorsements ==
Yes

U.S. senators

- Cory Gardner, U.S. senator from Colorado (2015–present) (Republican)

U.S. representatives

- Ken Buck, U.S. representative from Colorado's 4th congressional district (2015–present) and chairman of the Colorado Republican Party (2019–present)

Individuals

- Lauren Boebert, restaurant owner and nominee for Colorado's 3rd congressional district in 2020 (Republican)

Organizations

- Catholic Medical Association

Political parties

- Colorado Republican Party

Newspapers

- The Denver Gazette
No

Statewide officials

- John Hickenlooper, former governor of Colorado (2011–2019) (Democratic)

Organizations

- American Civil Liberties Union
- Planned Parenthood

Newspapers

- Boulder Weekly
- Colorado Springs Independent
- The Denver Post
- The Durango Herald
- Sentinel Colorado
- Steamboat Pilot & Today

== Polling ==
Poll source	Date(s) administered	Sample size (Note: Key: A – all adults RV – registered voters LV – likely voters V – unclear)	Margin of error	Phrasing	For	Against	Undecided
Civiqs	October 11–14, 2020	1,013 (LV)	±3.6%	If the election were held today, how would you vote on state Proposition 115, which would prohibit abortions in Colorado after a fetus reaches 22-weeks gestational age?	42%	51%	7%
YouGov/University of Colorado Boulder	October 5–9, 2020	800 (LV)	±4.64%	Proposition 115 would make performing a late-term abortion – when the gestational age of the fetus is at least twenty-two weeks – a misdemeanor punishable by a fine and a suspension of the medical license of those performing the abortion, except in instances where the abortion is required to save the life of the pregnant woman. If the election were held today, how would you vote on this proposition?	41%	45%	14%
SurveyUSA/KUSA/Colorado Politics	October 1–6, 2020	1,021 (LV)	±3.9%	A Yes vote on Proposition 115 prohibits abortion in Colorado after 22 weeks gestational age, except when an abortion is immediately required to save the life of a pregnant woman. A No vote on Proposition 115 means that current Colorado law is unchanged, and an abortion is legal at any time during a pregnancy. On Proposition 115, are you ... ?	42%	45%	13%

== Results ==
2020 Colorado Proposition 115
Choice	Votes	%
For	1,292,787	41.01
Against	1,859,479	58.99
Total	3,152,266	100.00
Valid votes	3,152,266	95.65
Invalid/blank votes	143,400	4.35
Total votes	3,295,666	100.00

=== By congressional district ===
"No" won five of seven congressional districts, including one that elected a Republican.

District	No	Yes	Representative
1st	75%	25%	Diana DeGette
2nd	67%	33%	Joe Neguse
3rd	52%	48%	Scott Tipton
3rd	52%	48%	Lauren Boebert
4th	48%	52%	Ken Buck
5th	47%	53%	Doug Lamborn
6th	60%	40%	Jason Crow
7th	63%	37%	Ed Perlmutter

== Analysis and aftermath ==
Map of Colorado counties overlaying the results of Proposition 115 and the concurrent presidential election in Colorado. Alamosa, Douglas, Grand, Hinsdale, Huerfano, Mineral, and Park counties voted against Proposition 115 and voted for Trump simultaneously. They are shaded in purple.

Proposition 115 performed the worst in traditionally Democratic counties, particularly around the Denver metropolitan area and Mineral Belt. Every county that voted for Joe Biden in the concurrent presidential election voted against Proposition 115, along with several counties that were won by Donald Trump, including Douglas, a suburban county of Denver.

Because Proposition 115 failed, no changes were immediately made to Colorado law regarding abortion access. Several million dollars were fundraised during the campaign, though groups in opposition to Proposition 115 significantly outraised those in favor. Following the failure of Proposition 115, abortion opposition groups attempted to get another ballot measure, Initiative 56, on the ballot in 2022, but did not receive enough signatures to qualify for the November ballot. Proposition 115 became the subject of debate during the 2022 U.S. Senate race in Colorado, as it became public that Joe O'Dea, the Republican nominee, both voted in favor of and signed the ballot access petition for Proposition 115.

Despite the June 2022 United States Supreme Court decision in Dobbs v. Jackson Women's Health Organization, abortion access in Colorado was not affected as Colorado did not have any legal restrictions. Governor Jared Polis signed the Reproductive Health Equity Act into law in April 2022, which codified Colorado's protections for abortion access into state law. More laws were signed into law protecting abortion access in Colorado in the following years, including a shield law protecting individuals coming to Colorado to seek reproductive healthcare, in April 2023 and April 2025. In 2024, 62% of Colorado voters voted in support of Amendment 79, which codified abortion access into the Colorado Constitution.

== See also ==
- Abortion in Colorado
- 2020 Colorado elections
