= Repopulation of wolves in Colorado =

In the 1940s, the gray wolf was nearly eradicated from the Southern Rockies. The species naturally expanded into habitats in Colorado they occupied prior to its near extirpation from the conterminous United States. Wolves were reintroduced in the northern Rocky Mountains in the 1990s and since at least 2014, solitary wolves have entered Colorado. A resident group in northwestern Colorado was confirmed in early 2020. In June 2021, Colorado Parks and Wildlife (CPW) reported that the first litter of wolf pups had been born in the state since the 1940s. Voters narrowly approved a November 2020 ballot measure that directed the commission that oversees CPW to develop a plan to begin to reintroduce wolves by the end of 2023, somewhere on the Western Slope. The wolves are managed and designated as a non-game species, meaning they cannot be hunted, with compensation being offered for any livestock killed by the predators. Wolves were protected as they are listed as endangered under federal and state law. As part of the reintroduction effort, the federal government in 2023 granted Colorado the authority to manage and kill wolves in specific circumstances. Colorado wildlife officials released 10 gray wolves from Oregon into a remote forest in Grand and Summit counties in late December 2023 as Colorado became the first state where voters directed the reintroduction of gray wolves rather than the federal government. Another fifteen wolves were released in Eagle and Pitkin counties in January 2025.

== Extirpation and protection ==
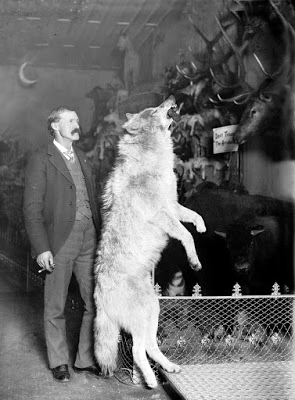
Breckenridge naturalist Edwin Carter with a mounted gray wolf killed in the Colorado Rockies, ca. 1890–1900.

Wolves once thrived here due to the availability of a number of big game species such as American bison, elk, and deer. Other prey for the wolves included a number of small game species like rabbits and rodents. Extirpation was caused by the decimation of the wolf's main prey species like bison, the expansion of agriculture, and extermination campaigns during the late 19th and early 20th centuries. As wolves turned to the nontraditional food source of fenced in and relatively defenseless cattle, Colorado established a bounty for killing wolves in 1869. These efforts included state bounties, which, at times, offered upwards of $1,000 for wolf pelts—significant income for ranchers and trappers as settlers perceived wolves as threats to livestock and human safety. After the trapping and poisoning of wolves in Colorado in the 1930s, the last wild wolf in the state was shot in 1940s in Conejos County.

In the 1960s and 1970s, national awareness of environmental issues and consequences led to the passage of laws designed to correct the mistakes of the past and help prevent similar mistakes in the future. Wolves in the United States were protected under the federal Endangered Species Act in 1978 as they were in danger of going extinct and needed protection to aid their recovery. The U.S. Fish and Wildlife Service removed the gray wolves' endangered species status at the beginning of January 2021, when more than 6,000 wolves inhabited nine states. After federal wolf protection ended, the states and tribes became responsible, once again, to manage the animal and regulate hunting. In Colorado wolves continue to be classified as a protected endangered species. Fines, jail time and a loss of hunting license privileges can result from violations. In February 2022, a judge ordered federal protections for gray wolves to be restored under the Federal Endangered Species Act, which returned management authority to the U.S. Fish and Wildlife Service.

== Natural recolonization ==
Wolves have been dispersing from the northern Rocky Mountains since they were introduced there in the 1990s. A Wolf Working Group was formed in 2004 to create a management plan that provides policy for Colorado wildlife managers as they handle potential conflicts between the wolves, humans, and livestock. Their report recommended that any wolves that migrate to Colorado "should be allowed to live with no boundaries where they find habitat". They also decided against pursuing wolf reintroduction. They recommended using various types of technology for monitoring their movements (GPS animal tracking and Camera traps), along with a management plan that would provide flexibility for ranchers concerned about attacks on livestock, and deal with concerns that wolves might impact the population of other species like elk. The Colorado Parks and Wildlife Commission affirmed and supported the recommendations. When considering the issue of wolf reintroduction in 2016, the commission adopted a formal resolution opposing intentional release of wolves.

Six gray wolves were photographed or killed in Colorado between 2004 and 2019. These animals are most likely from the natural dispersion of those reintroduced to Yellowstone National Park. Wildlife officials made a number of additional sightings in 2019. By 2021, some 3,000 wolves were inhabiting portions of Montana, Wyoming, Idaho, Oregon, Washington and Northern California. A pack of six wolves was confirmed in Moffat County in northwestern Colorado in early 2020. Hunters likely killed three members of the pack within a few months just across the border in Wyoming where hunting wolves was legal. F1084 (originally mislabeled as M1084), from the Snake River Pack in Wyoming, wandered more than 350 miles (560 km) into Colorado before her tracking collar went dead. She formed a breeding pair with M2101, a four-year-old male weighing approximately 110 pounds (50 kg) who was collared in February 2021. Governor Jared Polis dubbed the animals "Jane" and "John", respectively, and welcomed the pair to Colorado. Collaring the wolf was the first opportunity for Colorado Parks and Wildlife (CPW) to start the process of managing and tracking what's happening in Colorado since they gained authority over the species after the animals were removed from the endangered species list. Officials confirmed that they had six pups and were living in the state in June 2021, the first known litter in the state since the 1940s. One of the pups, a female, was fitted with a tracking collar in February 2022. The wolf was designated as F2202 using the first 2 digits to indicate the year and sequentially assigned the next 2 digits with an odd number for males and an even number for females. Physical evidence such as tracks and scat are also used by wildlife officers to track and observe wolves' movements and behaviors.

== Western slope reintroduction ==
Reintroducing wolves has been suggested by some, at least since the wolves were protected under the federal Endangered Species Act in 1978. While Colorado was not included in the 1987 Northern Rocky Mountain Recovery Plan, citizens of Colorado showed strong support for reintroducing wolves to their state, and a generally positive attitude towards wolves when Congress explored the possibility in 1992. A study, conducted in 2019 while the petition for the state to reintroduce wolves to public land in the Colorado Western Slope was being circulated for signatures, found a high degree of social tolerance or desire for wolf reintroduction in Colorado. The study also found that the media in Colorado reflected the concerns of those who might have their livelihoods impacted because of the loss of hunting opportunities, and potential for wolf predation on livestock. The concerns also included the safety of people and pets. After the petition was certified in early 2020, commissioners in several counties on the Western Slope passed resolutions opposing reintroduction of the animals. Less than a month after this ballot measure was scheduled for the November ballot, the establishment of a group of wolves in northwestern Colorado was confirmed by Parks and Wildlife (CPW). In November 2020, the ballot measure was narrowly approved by voters. The measure directed the Colorado Parks and Wildlife Commission to develop a reintroduction plan, using the best scientific data available, for gray wolf reintroduction in western Colorado west of the Continental Divide by the end of 2023. The measure also required fair compensation to be offered to ranchers for any livestock killed by wolves. CPW, which is overseen by the commission, began public outreach to gather input as the details of the plan such as management strategies, were needed to be worked out by the state agency.

One of the arguments in favor of wolf reintroduction was that they help maintain healthy ecosystems. As an apex predator and keystone species, they help maintain healthy and sustainable populations of other species by preventing overpopulation and overgrazing. The rural Western Slope, where the wolves will be reintroduced, voted heavily against the measure, while the more populous Front Range mostly supported the measure. Passage of the referendum was opposed by many cattle ranchers, elk hunters, farmers and others in rural areas that argue wolf reintroduction is bad policy which will threaten the raising of livestock and a $1 billion hunting industry. It was vital to ranchers that effective mechanisms are in place ahead of time to ensure fair sharing of the economic burdens that wolves generate. Typically, other Western states spend between $1 and 2 million annually for compensation, cost-sharing and management. While multiple studies have shown local declines in big game populations caused by wolves, other limiting factors such as severe winters, drought, other predators, or human hunting have acted in conjunction. The presence of wolves may also move the elk or deer around more which could make hunting a bit harder.

This vote made Colorado the first state where voters directed the reintroduction of gray wolves. Previous efforts by the federal government have brought back populations of wolves to the northern Rockies, New Mexico, Arizona and the Carolinas. In June 2021, CPW reported that the first litter of wolf pups had been born in the state since the 1940s. They were born to a pair of wolves that had naturally entered and settled in the state. This number of wolves is considered insufficient to establish a sustainable population.

=== Impact on ranching ===
The economy of rural northwestern Colorado includes vineyards, wineries, fruit orchards, and sheep and cattle ranches. Ranchers in North Park expressed concern in September 2021 when they started seeing the six wolf pups and their parents. The naturally returning wolf population potentially threatened their herds and livelihood. Ranchers and other residents are limited in the actions they can take to fend off the wolves under Colorado law and federal protections that were reinstated in February 2022. Unless a person's life is directly in danger, they can not do anything that might injure or kill the animals. CPW began working with ranchers in North Park in January 2022 after a wolf pack, that likely migrated in from Wyoming, killed livestock and a dog. The North Park basin in Colorado's north-central mountains saw the first payment made through the Game Damage Program which can also include prevention materials. Various methods have been developed to haze wolves to keep them away, and train them to avoid livestock. Don Gittleson, who has ranched for four decades, has been extremely motivated to find nonlethal means. About 3 miles (4.8 km) of fladry was set up around part of the Gittleson pasture by neighbors and U.S. Department of Agriculture Wildlife Services employees, consisting of a thin electric wire fence with flags. Night patrols have supplemented the prevention methods and provided observational data. Volunteer patrollers have come from an organization that supports coexistence of ranching families and wolves. Ranchers in other states have found burros will defend cattle that they have been living with. CPW staff provided wild burros in late February from the Nevada high country that were available for adoption to a rancher who experienced depredation, and has been piloting these various methods. The Gittlesons have also acquired several Longhorns on the 11,000-acre ranch (4,500 ha) they lease from the state. In June 2022, the last collar on a wolf in the North Park pack went dead and indications of the location or status of the wolf pack became limited. The 6-year-old female had not been spotted since mid-February in videos and photos of the pack consisting of the six yearlings and the breeding male. Wildlife officials have also confirmed there has been no denning activity, and no new pups have been seen as would have been expected. In 2022, CPW confirmed eight wolf-related livestock and stock dog deaths and made compensation payments. In late January-early February 2023, CPW used confirmed reports of wolf sightings from the public and a fixed-wing plane to look for wolves in order to collar two members of the North Park pack. On February 2, 2023, the collar on M2101 was replaced when he was captured along with another male, M2301, who is presumably one of six pups produced by F1084 and M2101 in 2021. M2101 slipped out of this collar a few days later, with a Colorado Parks & Wildlife (CPW) employee finding the collar on February 6 after it emitted a mortality signal. M2101 was spotted the next morning without a collar by the CPW. On February 18, M2101 was recaptured and refitted with the collar. M2301 was spotted alone in Grand County in April; typically he is seen with his father, M2101. Wyofile reported in September that it likely that at least one wolf from the North Park pack "wandered into Wyoming in 2023 and was killed". During 2022 and 2023, CPW confirmed that the North Park pack was responsible for killing or injuring 20 livestock, including 14 cattle, three sheep, and three working cattle dogs.

=== Restoration and management plan and public engagement ===
The Colorado Wolf Restoration and Management Plan Summer 2021 Public Engagement Report was released in November 2021, by Keystone Policy Center. The center facilitated public engagement and tribal consultations, and assisted CPW with the facilitation of the Stakeholder Advisory Group and Technical Working Group. The twenty-member Stakeholder Advisory Group represents different communities with livestock owners, outfitters, and environmentalists. The Technical Working Group, composed of elected officials from the Western Slope, CPW personnel and wolf experts involved in previous restoration efforts, focused on outlining the plan's conservation objectives and released an initial report in November with recommendations. The Technical Working Group presented its recommendations to the commission at a June 2022 meeting. In July, fourteen wildlife advocacy groups, including the Center for Biological Diversity, WildEarth Guardians, the Colorado Sierra Club and the Humane Society of the U.S. issued a 26-page plan with alternative protocol for the reintroduction. Their plan included a wolf population goal, reintroduction areas, compensation for lost livestock and other management guidelines that the state had yet to fully address. A bipartisan bill to fund the Wolf Depredation Compensation Fund was signed into law by the governor which compensates livestock owners for predation and harassment by wolves. Possible impacts on cattle that have become aware and afraid of nearby wolves and other predators include lost weight, lower conception rates, or injury from trying to hide.

A close partnership with the U.S. Fish and Wildlife Service became necessary when a federal judge restored endangered species protections in February 2022. To give the state authority to reintroduce wolves, the agencies are working to set up a 10(j) ruling under the Endangered Species Act, which by designating those wolves as an experimental population, gives the agencies more flexibility when trying to reestablish them in Colorado. If there is proof that they killed domestic animals, wolves may be hazed, killed or relocated. A bill, introduced by state legislators in March 2023, was passed by both chambers of the legislature with broad bipartisan support. The bill, that was vetoed by the governor, would have prohibit the reintroduction until the federal rule-making process is finalized and an environmental impact study is complete. Wildlife advocates said any challenges to the federal process could delay the reintroduction for years. The reintroduction was opposed by the Eagle County Board of Commissioners in August unless the federal designation of rule 10(j) was complete. The county, in which 53% of the voters opposed the measure, is a potential release site. Four scientists provided peer review of the experimental population rule. The special exception (10(j) permit) was approved by the U.S. Fish and Wildlife Service in November 2023.

The initial draft plan was released on December 9, 2022. The goal of the plan is "to recover and maintain a viable, self-sustaining wolf population in Colorado, while concurrently working to minimize wolf-related conflicts with domestic animals, other wildlife, and people". The final plan was unanimously approved in May 2023 by the commissioners which turns over implementation to CPW officials. The Colorado Department of Agriculture Commission also unanimously approved the management plan.

The plan proposed that the wolves would come from Idaho, Montana and Wyoming where hunting them is legal. State wildlife agencies manage wolf populations in these states as a congressional budget rider was used to delist wolves which did not change under the federal court action. The Montana state wildlife agency was asked by the Montana Stockgrower's Association to prevent wolves from being captured in their state for release in Colorado. Officials from all three states declined the request. Utah is also listed in the proposed 10(j) rule. The state, which also manages their wolves, had already indicated that they would not provide any wolves during public comment period. Federally recognized Native American tribes could exercise their sovereignty and give wolves to Colorado. Colorado Parks and Wildlife reached out to the Nez Perce tribe which is located in the heart of Idaho's wolf country and the southeast corner of Washington and the northeast corner of Oregon. Washington and Oregon were listed in the plan as possible alternatives. The wolves in the eastern portion of those states were included in the congressional delisting. Washington could not complete the necessary actions to provide wolves by the end of 2023. A one-year agreement was reached with Oregon in October. As rule 10(j) became effective in early December, the Gunnison County Stockgrowers' Association and Colorado Cattlemen's Association requested a temporary restraining order to put an immediate halt to the impending release of wolves. The request would delay the project while the judge considers whether the federal agreement behind the process requires a full environmental review under the National Environmental Policy Act. The motion was swiftly denied, allowing CPW to continue working with Oregon to capture wolves. The associations withdrew their lawsuit against the state and federal governments in late December.

=== Procedures and possible release sites ===
The likely release sites will be on state and private land with willing owners rather than widely available U.S. Forest Service land. Compliance with the National Environmental Policy Act would have been required to release wolves on federal land which the state would be unable to complete before the voter mandated deadline. A study in 2022 showed that, based on the vote on the reintroduction ballot initiative and other factors, southwest Colorado would be a more welcoming area than other places with suitable wolf habitat. The high-altitude mountains between Aspen and Durango are a zone with enough prey and higher levels of social acceptance. Three likely reintroduction release sites with the highest release potential have been identified in previous studies; (1) White River and Routt national forests and Flat Tops Wilderness Area, roughly located north of Glenwood Springs and southwest of Steamboat Springs; (2) Grand Mesa and Gunnison national forests, roughly located south of Glenwood Springs, southwest of Aspen and east of Grand Junction; (3) San Juan Mountains and Weminuche Wilderness, tucked between Silverton and Pagosa Springs. Rocky Mountain National Park was not included in the potential reintroduction sites although the west side of the park was the most-mentioned public suggestion due to the abundance of elk, the main prey species available in Colorado.

Wolves tend to move after reintroduction so they will be released at least 60 miles (97 km) from the border with Wyoming, Utah, and New Mexico, as well as Southern Ute tribal lands in southwest Colorado minimizing the risk of the animal immediately migrating into other jurisdictions. A 2008 memorandum of understanding (MOU) about wildlife management recognized these off-reservation rights and sovereign authority over tribal lands. The two governments' coordination and communication on the reintroduction was formalized in a 2024 MOU. The tribe's request to not release wolves in the 3.7 million acres (1,500,000 ha) of the Brunot Treaty of 1873 where the tribe retained hunting, fishing and gathering rights was included in the MOU. The Wyoming Department of Agriculture (WDA) has concerns that wolves coming into the state pose a substantial and critical threat to livestock in Wyoming. Similar concerns were included in a letter from Utah Department of Natural Resources. CPW has also discussed possible impacts to the Mexican Wolf Recovery Program with New Mexico, Arizona and Utah. The first release proposed by the plan was somewhere between Vail and Glenwood Springs which is defined by the I-70 corridor. This northern preferred release area is within an oval around this corridor that roughly includes the rugged mountains and lush valleys between Rifle, Aspen, Silverthorne and Kremmling. The southern preferred release area is a smaller oval, directly below the northern area, between Montrose and Monarch Pass at the Continental Divide which is defined by U.S. Route 50.

The plan included releasing 10 to 15 wolves each year. Contracted helicopter crews and spotter planes assist CPW in capturing the wolves. Wolves are tested and treated for disease along with taking physical measurements at the source site. All the wolves are fitted with GPS tracking collars. Captured animals are transported in aluminum crates to the release site. The nonprofit Light Hawk Aviation offered its services to transport the wolves from Oregon. Volunteer pilots fulfill their mission to use aviation to make conservation efforts more efficient and effective. With a hard-release, the wolves immediately find their own way. Supplemental food or care is not provided after release.

=== Releases ===
Five wolves were captured in Oregon on December 17, 2023, in what has been called the "most ambitious wolf reintroduction effort in the U.S. in almost three decades". The fragmented populations across the Great Lakes, the northern Rockies, and the Western US could be connected by new wolf packs in Colorado. The wolves included two pairs of 1-year-old male and female siblings, as well a 2-year-old male. The animals were captured from three different packs with tranquilizer darts shot from a helicopter, their health was evaluated, and they received vaccines. Colorado wildlife officials released the wolves the next day onto public land in a remote forest in Grand County at an undisclosed location. Colorado Governor Jared Polis attended along with about 45 invited guests which included media personnel. Five more wolves from Oregon were released under similar procedures which expanded to Summit County on December 22. In order to protect the safety and security of the wolves, the release was not performed in a publicized manner like the earlier one. CPW continued to seek agreements to provide wolves but did not plan on releasing additional wolves in the remainder of the season.

CPW reached an agreement with the British Columbia Ministry of Water, Lands and Resource Stewardship in Canada in September 2024 to source wolves for the second round of reintroductions. Capture operations in British Columbia began in January 2025. Once a helicopter located a wolf, a net gun was used to immobilize the animal. A second helicopter landed to evaluate the health of each animal and administer vaccines before being it was transported to Colorado. While there were no federal quarantine requirements, custom procedures included permits and inspections in Canada and the United States. The fifteen wolves that were captured were released in Eagle and Pitkin counties on January 12, 14, and 16.

== Pack formation and reactions ==
The lack of communication and transparency around the first release was a concern of some CPW commissioners and others. There is a feeling among ranchers in the counties with release sites that the state added wolves to their existing concerns about the safety of their cattle when they were already dealing with coyotes, mountain lions and occasional bears. CPW released a map on January 31, 2024, showing the watersheds where the 12 collared wolves are roaming. The tracks of two wolves that reached eastern Moffat County two months after their release were noticed by ranchers. Traveling from western Routt County, this was the farthest collar-reported location from the initial release sites. The wolves also expanded their movement in Jackson and Larimer counties but were not close to the border with Wyoming. A new map is issued monthly showing that data for at least one GPS point from a wolf collar was within the watershed boundaries. Depredations early in 2024 in Grand and Jackson counties involved a wolf or wolves from the reintroduced wolves. Federal wildlife officials announced on April 23 that one of the wolves had died. It was determined that it likely died from predation by a mountain lion while traveling alone. A wolf pup in Grand County was confirmed on June 18 during routine wolf monitoring efforts by CPW.

== Other initiatives ==
A specialty wolf license plate was approved in 2023 to fund nonlethal wolf mitigation and conflict prevention programs. This is the only funding available for these programs which includes training, personnel, equipment, community outreach, and research.

The Canada lynx was successfully reintroduced in Colorado starting in 1999, after being extirpated from the state in the 1970s. The state has had plans to reintroduce wolverines since the late 1990s but Colorado wildlife officials have not pursued the effort due to the uncertainty on whether the species will be protected under the Endangered Species Act by the U.S. Fish and Wildlife Service. The last stable population in Colorado of this animal that needs large areas of cold, rocky habitat to survive was in 1919.

== See also ==
- History of wolves in Yellowstone
- List of gray wolf populations by country
- Repopulation of wolves in California
- Repopulation of wolves in Midwestern United States
