= Wolf reintroduction =

Reestablishment of extirpated native wolves

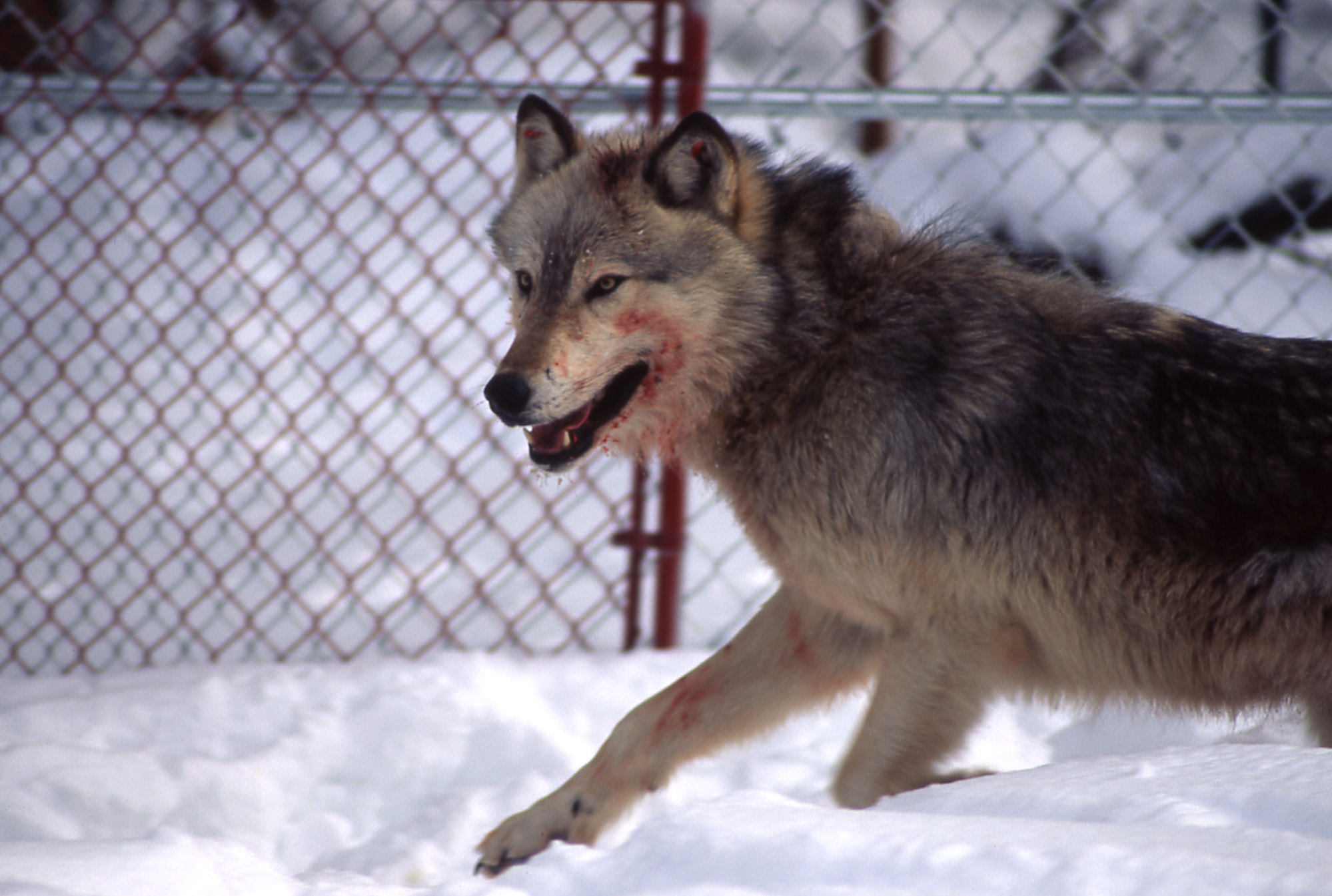
Wolf #10, a male, in the Rose Creek acclimation pen, Yellowstone National Park

Wolf reintroduction involves the reintroduction of a portion of grey wolves in areas where native wolves have been extirpated. This is only considered though if suitable land and resources can be found for the target species. In the case of wolves this can be rather tricky as they need fairly large amounts of land to roam. This process often comes with conflict from parties who may oppose wolf reintroduction, and efforts are often large public issues. Over the past thirty years there have been several wolf reintroduction efforts across the world in areas like Yellowstone, the Southern USA, Appalachia, Mexico, and throughout different parts of Europe. More than 30 subspecies of Canis lupus have been recognized, and grey wolves, as colloquially understood, comprise non domestic/feral subspecies.

== United States ==
=== Arizona and New Mexico ===
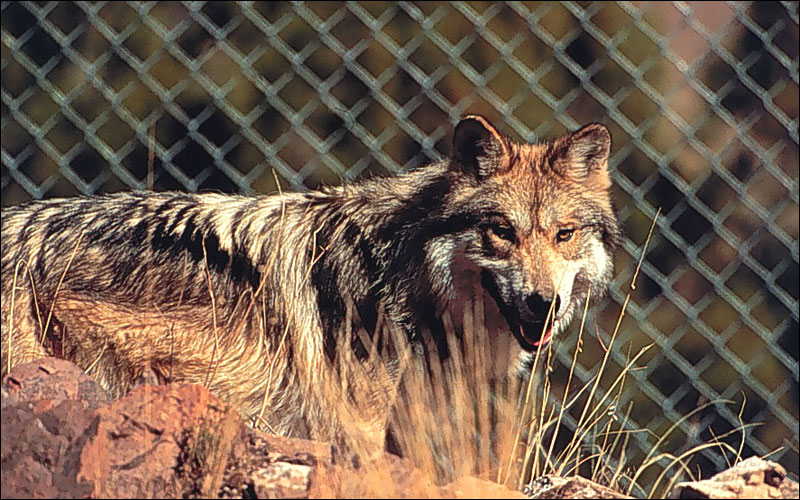
Captive-bred Mexican wolf in pen, Sevilleta National Wildlife Refuge

The five last known wild Mexican gray wolves were captured in 1980 in accordance with an agreement between the United States and Mexico intended to save the critically endangered subspecies. Between 1982 and 1998, a comprehensive captive-breeding program brought Mexican wolves back from the brink of extinction. Over 300 captive Mexican wolves were part of the recovery program.

The ultimate goal for these wolves is to reintroduce them to areas of their former range. In March 1998, this reintroduction campaign began with the releasing of three packs into the Apache-Sitgreaves National Forest in Arizona, and 11 wolves into the Blue Range Wilderness Area of New Mexico. By 2014, as many as 100 wild Mexican wolves were in Arizona and New Mexico. The final goal for Mexican wolf recovery is a wild, self-sustaining population of at least 300 individuals. In 2021, 186 wolves were counted in the annual survey, of which 114 wolves were spotted in New Mexico and the other 72 in Arizona. This shows a steady growth throughout the last 5 years.

==== Distribution and population ====
As of March 2026, there were at least 319 wild Mexican wolves in the United States: 176 in New Mexico and 143 in Arizona. This represents 10 years of consecutive population growth. The total captive Mexican wolf population is 380 individuals, across over 60 facilities.

=== Colorado ===
Wolves traversed a Rocky Mountain pathway from Canada to Mexico until the 1940s. They are seen by wildlife experts as essential to the native balance of species, species interactions, and ecosystem health. But are seen as a problem species by many as they have a reputation of attacking and hunting livestock. Colorado Parks and Wildlife (CPW) created a multidisciplinary working group that drafted a wolf management plan for possible reintroduction. The Colorado Wildlife Commission approved the plan in May 2005.

Proposition 114, a ballot initiative to introduce wolves on the Western Slope by 2023, was narrowly approved by voters in November 2020. The Colorado Parks and Wildlife Commission was tasked with preparing a plan.

In late December 2023, the first wolves were released onto public land in Summit and Grand counties. The 10 wolves were translocated from Oregon. The group consisted of two adult male, two juvenile males, and six juvenile females. However, since then several of those wolves have died, mostly from illegal shootings. Because of this CPW translocated another fifteen wolves from British Columbia, Canada in 2025. There continues to be quite a lot of discourse between parties over the Colorado wolf reintroduction, as those who are against it still feel like the wolves pose a threat to the agricultural business, and those who support it push for even more protective legislature around the wolves.

=== Northern Rocky Mountains ===
Map showing wolf packs in the Greater Yellowstone Ecosystem as of 2002.

Grey wolf packs were reintroduced to Yellowstone National Park and Idaho starting in 1995. These wolves were considered as “experimental, nonessential” populations per article 10(j) of the Endangered Species Act (ESA). Such classification gave government officials greater leeway in managing wolves to protect livestock, which was considered one of a series of compromises wolf reintroduction proponents made with concerned local ranchers.

Local industry and environmental groups battled for decades over the Yellowstone and Idaho wolf reintroduction effort. The idea of wolf reintroduction was first brought to Congress in 1966 by biologists who were concerned with the critically high elk populations in Yellowstone and the ecological damages to the land from excessively large herds. Officially, 1926 was when the last wolves were killed within Yellowstone's boundaries. When the wolves were eradicated and hunting eliminated, the elk population boomed. Over the succeeding decades, elk populations grew so large that they unbalanced the local ecosystem. The number of elk and other large prey animals increased to the point that they gathered in large herds along valley bottoms and meadows, overgrazing new-growth vegetation. Because of overgrazing, deciduous woody plant species, such as upland aspen and riparian cottonwood, became seriously diminished. So, because the keystone predators, the wolves, had been removed from the Yellowstone-Idaho ecosystem, the ecosystem changed. This change affected other species as well. Coyotes filled in the niche left by wolves, but could not control the large ungulate populations. Booming coyote numbers, furthermore, also had a negative effect on other species, particularly the red fox, pronghorn, and domestic sheep. Ranchers, though, remained steadfastly opposed to reintroducing a species of animal that they considered to be analogous to a plague, citing the hardships that would ensue with the potential loss of stock caused by wolves.

The government, which was charged with creating, implementing, and enforcing a compromise, struggled for over two decades to find middle ground. A wolf recovery team was appointed in 1974, and the first official recovery plan was released for public comment in 1982. General public apprehension regarding wolf recovery forced the U.S. Fish and Wildlife Service to revise their plan to implement more control for local and state governments, so a second recovery plan was released for public comment in 1985. That same year, a poll conducted at Yellowstone National Park showed that 74% of visitors thought wolves would improve the park, while 60% favored reintroducing them. The preparation of an environmental impact statement (EIS), the last critical step before reintroduction could be approved, was halted when Congress insisted that further research be done before an EIS was to be funded.

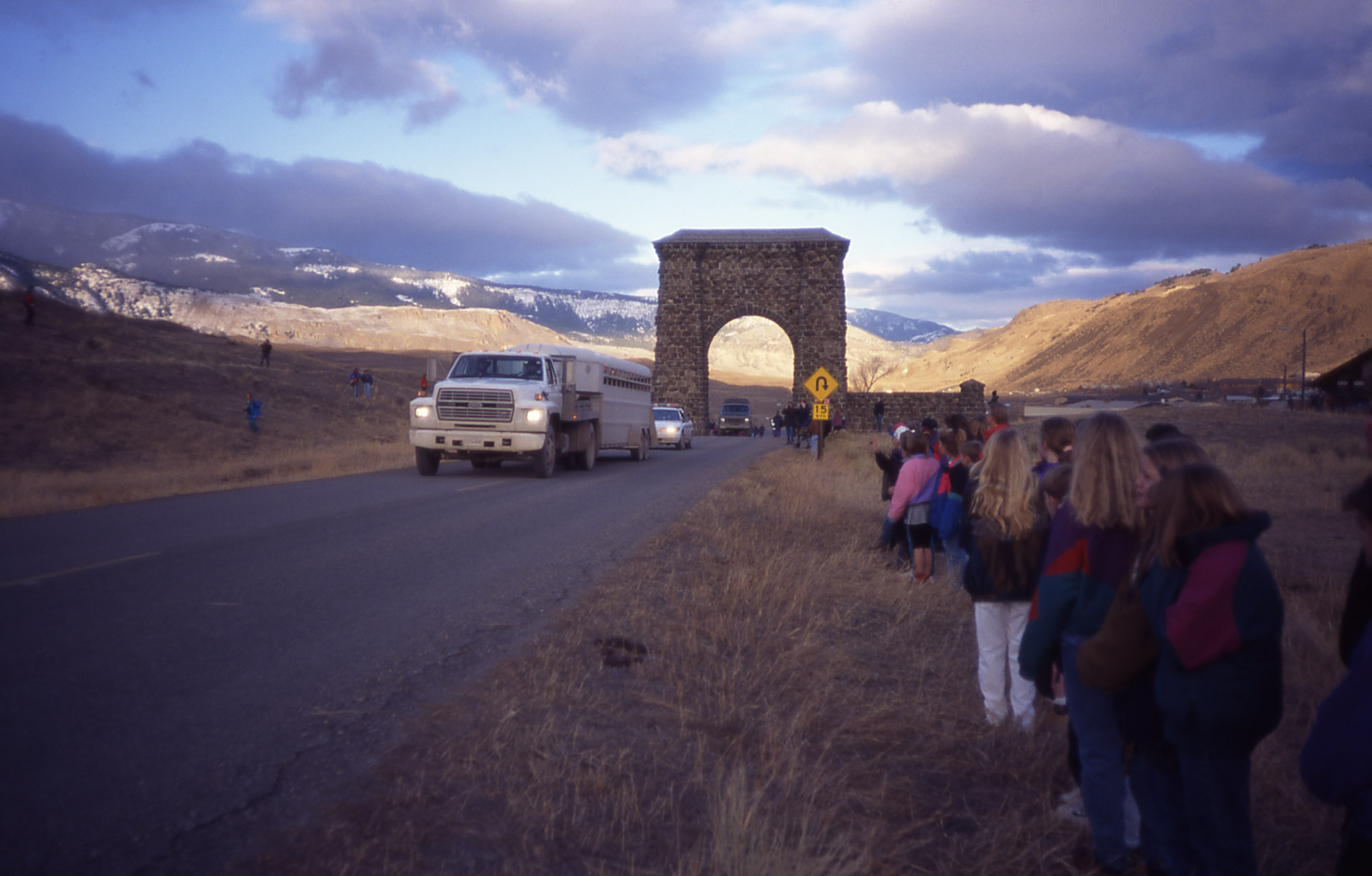
People look on as the grey wolves are trucked through Roosevelt Arch, Yellowstone National Park, January 1995.

In 1987, in an effort to shift the burden of financial responsibility from ranchers to the proponents of wolf reintroduction, Defenders of Wildlife set up a "wolf compensation fund" that would use donations to pay ranchers market value for any stock that was lost to wolf depredation. That same year, a final recovery plan was released. Following a long period of research, public education, and public commenting, a draft EIS was released for public review in 1993, and it received over 150,000 comments from interested parties. It was finalized in May 1994, and included a clause that specified that all wolves reintroduced to the recovery zones would be classified under the "experimental, nonessential" provision of the ESA. Though the original plan called for three recovery zones – one in Idaho, another in Montana, and a final one in the greater Yellowstone area – the Montana recovery zone was eliminated from the final EIS after it had been proven that a small, but breeding population had already established itself in the northwestern part of the state. The plan stipulated that each of the three recovery areas must have 10 breeding pairs of wolves successfully rearing two or more pups for three consecutive years before the minimum recovery goals would be reached.

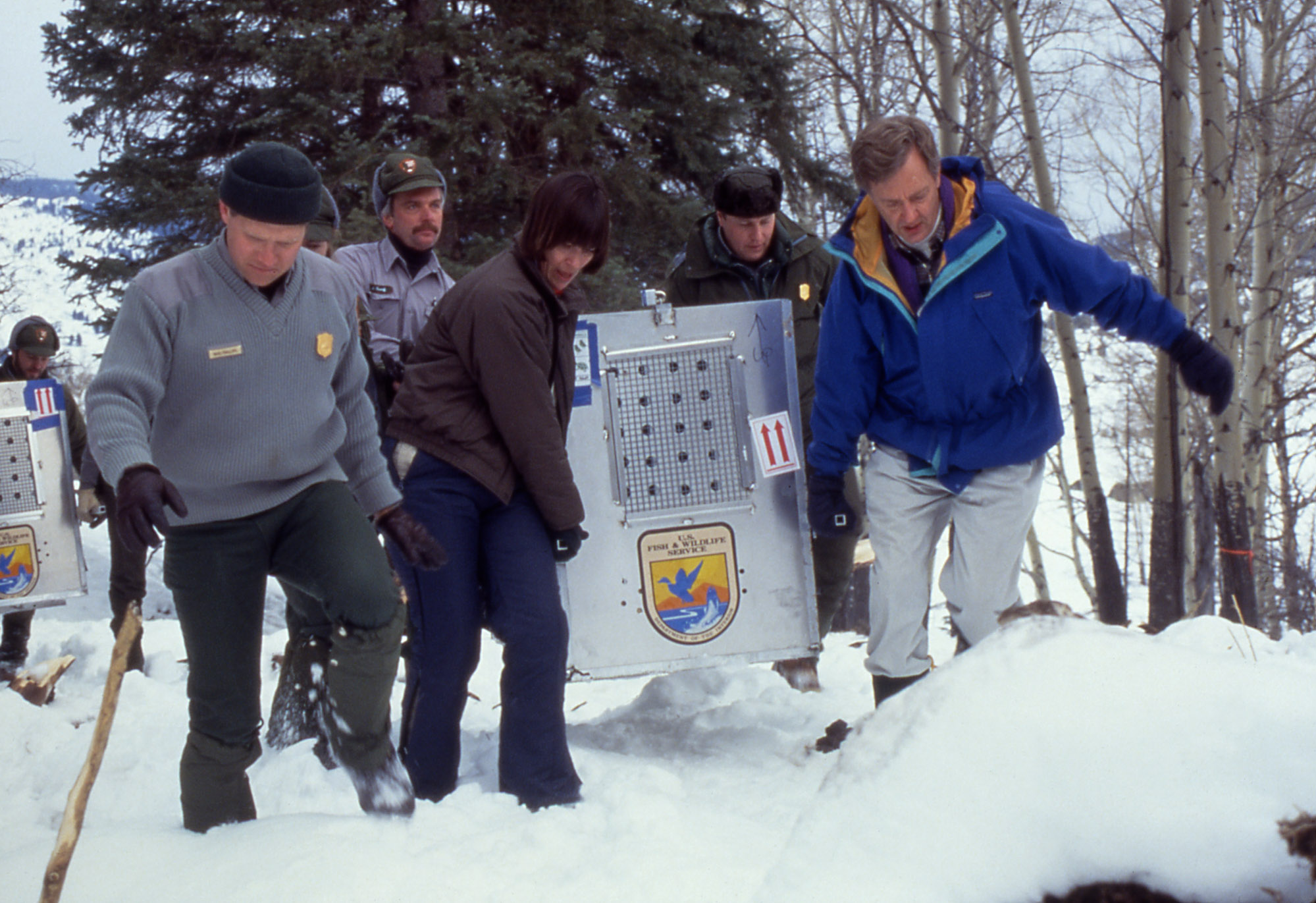
Reintroduced wolves being carried to acclimation pens, Yellowstone National Park, January 1995

Two lawsuits filed in late 1994 put the recovery plan in jeopardy. While one of the lawsuits was filed by the Wyoming Farm Bureau, the other was filed by a coalition of concerned environmental groups including the Idaho Conservation League and Audubon Society. The latter group pointed to unofficial wolf sightings as proof that wolves had already migrated down to Yellowstone from the north, which, they argued, made the plan to reintroduce an experimental population in the same area unlawful. According to their argument, if wolves were already present in Yellowstone, they should rightfully be afforded full protection under the ESA, which, they reasoned, was preferable to the limited "experimental" classification that would be given to any reintroduced wolves.

Nevertheless, both cases were thrown out on January 3, 1995. Adolescent members from packs of Mackenzie Valley wolves in Alberta, Canada, were tranquilized and carted down to the recovery zones later that week, but a last-minute court order delayed the planned releases. The stay came from an appellate court in Denver, and was instigated by the Wyoming Farm Bureau. After spending an additional 36 hours in transport cages in Idaho and in their holding pens in Yellowstone, the wolves were finally released following official judicial sanction. Yellowstone's wolves stayed in acclimation pens for two more months before being released into the wild. Idaho's wolves, conversely, were given a hard (or immediate) release. Sixty-six wolves were released to the two areas in this manner in January 1995 and January 1996.

The 2005 estimates of wolf populations in the two recovery zones reflect the success the species has had in both areas:

- Greater Yellowstone area: 325
- Central Idaho: 565

These numbers, added with the estimated number of wolves in northwestern Montana (130), puts the total number of wolves in the Northern Rocky Mountains recovery area at over 1000 individuals. This includes about 134 packs (two or more wolves traveling together) and 71 breeding pairs (male and female that successfully rear a litter of at least two until Dec. 31). The recovery goal for the area was revised to 30 breeding pairs total, and this number has been surpassed for some time.

Current wolf population statistics can be found at Gray Wolf (Canis lupus) | U.S. Fish & Wildlife Service

Over the decades since wolves have been present in the region, hundreds of incidents of livestock depredation have been confirmed, though such predation represents a minute proportion of a wolf's diet on a per-wolf basis. While the majority of wolves ignore livestock entirely, a few wolves or wolf packs become chronic livestock hunters, and most of these have been killed to protect livestock. Since the year Defenders of Wildlife implemented their compensation fund, they have allocated over $1,400,000 to private owners for proven and probable livestock depredation by wolves. Opponents argue that the Yellowstone reintroductions were unnecessary, as American wolves were never in danger of biological extinction, since wolves still persisted in Canada. Opponents have also stated that wolves are of little commercial benefit, as cost estimates on wolf recovery are from $200,000 to $1 million per wolf. The Lamar Valley is one of the best places in the world to observe wolves, though, and tourism based on wolves is booming. The growing wolf-viewing outfitting trend contrasts with declines for big-game hunters. National Park Service Biologist Wayne Brewster informed guides and outfitters living north of Yellowstone National Park, to expect a 50% drop in harvestable game when wolves were reintroduced to Yellowstone National Park. This was confirmed when in 2006, the Yellowstone elk herd had in fact shrunk to 50% since the mid 1990s, though researchers documented that most of the elk that fell prey to wolves were very old, diseased, or very young. Two 30-day periods of tracking radio-collared wolves showed that 77–97% of prey species documented by wolves in the park were elk. Outside the park, numerous hunting outfitters have closed due to the concomitant 90% reduction in elk permits. Defenders of Wildlife transitioned from paying compensation to helping ranchers use nonlethal methods to better protect livestock from wolf predation. These methods include carcass removal to reduce attractants to scavengers, increased human presence near livestock, lighting, herd management, livestock guard dogs, and other measures.

The reintroduction of wolves, an apex predator, has had important impacts on biodiversity within Yellowstone National Park. Through predation of elk populations, wolf reintroduction has coincided with an increase of new-growth vegetation among certain plants, such as aspen and willow trees, which elk previously grazed upon at unsustainable levels. Presence of wolves has even changed behavioral patterns of other animals. Elk have quit venturing into deeper thickets, out of fear of being attacked by wolves in an area of such low visibility. Elk have also begun avoiding open areas such as valley bottoms and open meadows, where prior to wolf introduction, the elk grazed collectively and avoided predation from mountain lions and bears. This process of top predators regulating the lower sections of the trophic pyramid was dubbed, "the ecology of fear" by William J. Ripple and Robert L. Bestcha In addition to the restoration of vegetation several important species, such as the beaver (which also became extinct in the park) and red fox have also recovered, probably due to the wolves keeping coyote populations under control.

The Idaho state government opposed the reintroduction of wolves into the state, and many ranchers and hunters there feel as if the wolves were forced onto the state by the federal government. The state's wolf management plan is prefaced by the legislature's memorial declaring that the official position of the state is the removal of all wolves by any means necessary. Because of the state of Idaho's refusal to participate in wolf restoration, the US Fish and Wildlife Service (FWS) and the Nez Perce tribe initially managed the wolf population there since the reintroduction. During that time, the Idaho wolf population had made the most remarkable comeback in the region, with its abundant federal lands and wilderness areas peaking at nearly 900 wolves (almost half of the regional wolf population) in 2009. However, the wolves have increasingly been blamed for livestock and hunting opportunity losses. The FWS attempted twice to delist wolves from federal protection and turn them over to state management, but both of those attempts were found unlawful by the federal court in Missoula, Montana. To quell the political battle between the ranchers, hunters, and conservationists, members of Congress removed Endangered Species Act protection from wolves in 2011 and gave wolf management to the states of Idaho and Montana under state wolf management plans. Since that time, the FWS has also delisted wolves from federal protection in Wyoming, and the state now has authority over wolf management there, as well. This decision is also being challenged as unlawful in court in 2013.

Despite being approved by the FWS, Idaho's proposed management plan is still shrouded in controversy. The plan calls for 10 breeding pairs in Idaho or 100 to 150 wolves. Compared with the state's other wildlife numbers (e.g. 2000-3000 mountain lions, 20,000 American black bears, 100,000 elk, and several hundred thousand mule deer), conservationists are concerned that too few wolves are protected under the plan. According to the FWS guidelines, the Idaho wolf population needs to stay above 100 individuals for the species to stay off the endangered species list and remain a viable, self-sustaining population, but much evidence shows that a much larger wolf population can survive in Idaho without having major impacts on livestock and hunting opportunities.

In adjacent Washington and Oregon, wolves were not reintroduced, but populations have been re-established through the natural expansion of the Idaho population. By 2008, wolves had established a permanent toehold in Washington, and have increased their number every year since. The Washington and Oregon Departments of Fish and Wildlife track the wolf population in their respective states and the "minimum numbers" of wolves. In Washington, this number only counts wolves in known packs that den inside the state. Lone wolves, suspected packs, and packs that range into the state but den outside it are not counted. In 2008, this "minimum number" was five; by the end of 2014, it was 68; in 2023 it was 260. Known wolf packs are concentrated in the northeastern corner of the state, but packs occur also in the central Cascades. The state of Washington has convened a "Wolf Advisory Group," consisting of ranchers, environmental advocates, hunters, and other stakeholders, to try to address wolf return and wolf-livestock conflict, but their process has been contentious.

==== Current distribution and population ====
As of March 2023, the Northern Rocky Mountains gray wolf population is now distributed across western Montana (1,100 wolves), western Wyoming (311 wolves), Idaho (1,337 wolves), eastern Washington (206 wolves), and eastern Oregon (175 wolves). There is a small presence in northern California (30 wolves) and in December 2023, a small population was released in northern Colorado to complement the small number of wolves that had naturally dispersed into the state (16 wolves).

=== Great Smoky Mountains National Park ===
Red wolves were once native to the Southeastern United States, but the last wolf seen in the vicinity of the park was in 1905. In 1991, two pairs were reintroduced into the Great Smoky Mountains National Park. Despite some early success, the program was cancelled in 1998 due to the death of wolf pups from malnutrition and disease, and the wolves roaming beyond the boundaries of the park. The wolves were relocated to North Carolina in 1998, ending the effort to reintroduce the species to the park.

=== North and South Carolina ===
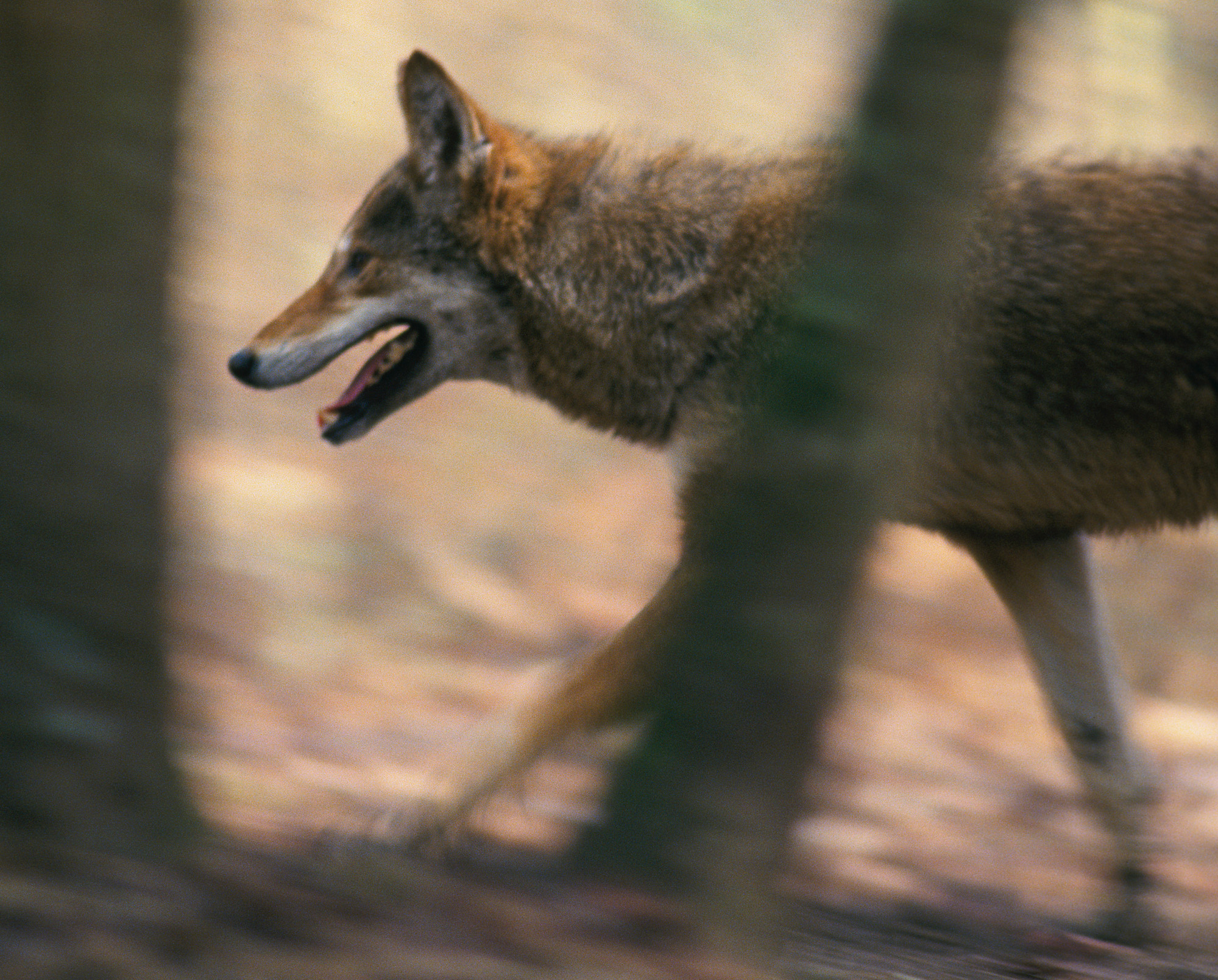
Canis rufus walking in a forest

In December 1976, two red wolves were released onto Cape Romain National Wildlife Refuge's Bulls Island in South Carolina with the intent of testing and honing reintroduction methods. They were not released with the intent of beginning a permanent population on the island. The first experimental translocation lasted for 11 days, during which a mated pair of red wolves was monitored day and night with remote telemetry. A second experimental translocation was tried in 1978, with a different mated pair, and they were allowed to remain on the island for close to 9 months. After that, a larger project was executed in 1987 to reintroduce a permanent population of red wolves back to the wild in the Alligator River National Wildlife Refuge (ARNWR) on the eastern coast of North Carolina. Also in 1987, Bulls Island became the first island breeding site. Pups were raised on the island and relocated to North Carolina until 2005.

In September 1987, four pairs of red wolves were released in ARNWR in northeastern North Carolina and designated as an experimental population. Since then, the experimental population has grown and the recovery area expanded to include four national wildlife refuges, a Department of Defense bombing range, state-owned lands, and private lands, encompassing about 1,700,000 acres (6,900 km^{2}).

According to the Red Wolf Recovery Program First Quarter Report (October–December 2010), the FWS estimated that 110-130 red wolves were in the Red Wolf Recovery Area in North Carolina, but since not all of the newly bred-in-the-wild red wolves have radio collars, they can only confirm a total of 70 "known" individuals, 26 packs, 11 breeding pairs, and 9 additional individuals not associated with a pack.

Interbreeding with the coyote has been recognized as a threat affecting the restoration of red wolves. Currently, adaptive management efforts are making progress in reducing the threat of coyotes to the red wolf population in northeastern North Carolina. Other threats, such as habitat fragmentation, disease, and anthropogenic mortality, are of concern in their restoration. Efforts to reduce the threats are presently being explored.

Over 30 facilities participate in the red wolf Species Survival Plan, and oversee the breeding and reintroduction of over 150 wolves.

However, relaxed protections and a halt of reintroductions in the early 2010s led to a plummet in the population due to poaching and vehicle collisions. The wild population declined from approximately 130 individuals in 2010 to less than 10 individuals by 2021. No wild litters were born between 2019 and 2021.

Under pressure from conservation groups, the US Fish and Wildlife Service resumed reintroductions and increased protection. Reintroductions resumed in 2021. In 2022, the first wild litter was born since 2018. As of 2023, there are between 15 and 17 wild red wolves in ARNWR.

=== Gulf Coast ===
In 1989, the second island propagation project was initiated with release of a population of red wolves on Horn Island off the Mississippi coast. This population was removed in 1998 because of a likelihood of encounters with humans. The third island propagation project introduced a population on St. Vincent Island, Florida, offshore between Cape San Blas and Apalachicola, Florida, in 1990, and in 1997, the fourth island propagation program introduced a population to Cape St. George Island, Florida, south of Apalachicola.

=== New York ===
An official analysis of wolves in New York by the New York State Department of Environmental Conservation (DEC) stated that, due to the adaptability of wolves to different habitats, there exists a significant amount of area (about 6,000 square miles (16,000 km^{2}) of the Adirondacks) in the state suitable for wolves, and that the best course of action for the organization would be to reintroduce the species. Despite no confirmed breeding population, wolves are still listed as Endangered in the state, and are a protected species under Environmental Conservation Law (ECL) section 11-0535. An interview with DEC biologists in 2015 explained that three extirpated carnivores (wolves, cougars, and Canada lynx) were removed from the state's proposed list of Species of Greatest Conservation Need in order to focus on extant species within the state, and that there were no plans by the DEC to reintroduce wolves, citing a lack of public and state support, funding, and personnel. They also highlighted that, even with all these factors, the type of wolves that would be brought in would be unknown, since records cite both the eastern wolf and red wolf as present in the state; the two canines have ongoing taxonomic discussions.

DNA results of a canid killed near Cherry Valley in 2021 initially pointed to it being an eastern coyote, but a recent statement by the DEC confirms the animal was a wolf, with most of its ancestry matching wolves in Michigan; the DEC also has not confirmed or denied a breeding population within the state. Certain proponents of wolf recolonization state that wolves are already established in New York and New England, and have naturally dispersed from Canada by crossing the frozen St. Lawrence River.

== Mexico ==
=== Sonora, Chihuahua, and Durango ===
On October 11, 2011, 5 Mexican wolves (2 males and 3 females) were released into Sonora's Madrean Sky Islands. Since then, Mexico's National Commission of Natural Protected Areas (CONANP) has facilitated 19 wolf releases into the country.

On March 9, 2022, two new breeding pairs of Mexican gray wolves were released into the wild in the state of Chihuahua in northern Mexico, bringing the total number of Mexican gray wolves in the country to around 45 wild individuals. In 2026, eight wolves were reintroduced to Durango.

== Europe ==
=== Northern Europe ===
In Sweden and Norway, a long and ongoing conflict is happening between some groups who believe that wolves have no place in human-inhabited areas and those who wish the wolf to be allowed to expand out into more of the area's vast boreal forests. The former mostly consists of members of the rural working class who fear competition for certain large ungulate species (roe deer, moose, etc.), and who consider the wolf to be a foreign element. They argue that modern Scandinavian wolves are actually recent migrants from Russia and not the remnants of old native wolf packs.

Scandinavian wolves had been nearly completely eliminated from the range due to extirpation campaigns in the 19th and 20th centuries, and were considered to be gone from the area by the 1960s. In the early 1980s, however, a single breeding pack was discovered in southern Sweden, over 1000 km away from the nearest known population in Russia or eastern Finland. The pack was small, about 10 animals, and it stayed that way for many years until its population began to noticeably increase starting in 1991. Prior to 1991, the small population lacked ideal genetic diversity, and inbreeding had been occurring to a potentially dangerous degree. Furthermore, low birth rates suggested that the wolves were apprehensive to mate with each other, which was most likely due to their close relation. Genetic data suggest that in 1991, a lone immigrant wolf from Russia migrated to the area and single-handedly restored genetic diversity to the population. A study showed that of the 72 wolves born between 1993 and 2001, 68 of them could trace their genetic heritage to this lone migrant wolf. Today, over 100 individuals range across this southern area of Scandinavia. The population remains genetically isolated, however, which is a cause of concern for some, but reason to believe exists that as the number of wolves living in this area increases, the boundaries of the population's range will creep towards the ranges of other, separate populations in Finland, thus promoting dispersal. Direct reintroduction remains an intriguing option to foster genetic diversity in the Scandinavian population in the meantime.

Speculation arose as to how the original population came to be in the early 1980s. Some believe that they might be a native species – remnants of a population that somehow survived persecution. Much genetic research has been performed on this population, however, and this particular theory is not supported by the findings. Genetic analysis seems to support the idea that the wolves were immigrants that had traveled over 1000 km from Russia to southern Scandinavia along one of several possible dispersal routes. Conspiracy theorists claim that they were artificially reintroduced by some secret agenda of the Swedish government.

=== Central and Western Europe ===
In several areas in Europe, reintroduction of wolves to areas where they have become extinct is being actively considered. Charities in many European countries, including Denmark, Germany, Italy, Ireland, and the United Kingdom, are also advocating the reintroduction of wolves to specific rural and forested areas. Most plans have been met with a mixture of enthusiasm and unease by different population groups. Opponents fear the loss of livestock that may result from their reintroduction. In several countries, charity-based compensation plans (similar to those that operate in the USA) have been proposed. A pack of wolves was released in 2015 in the Scottish Highlands; their location was not disclosed to protect them from hunters.

The reintroduction of wolves to Scotland and England is currently being considered, along with bears and lynxes, as part of a larger effort to reintroduce native species to the country.
