= Callie Rennison =

Criminologist

Member of the University of Colorado Board of Regents from the 2nd district
- Incumbent
- Assumed office January 7, 2021
- Preceded by: Linda Shoemaker

Personal details
- Born: 1963 or 1964 (age 61–62)
- Party: Democratic
- Education: University of Houston (BS, MA, MA, PhD)

Callie Marie Rennison (born 1963/1964) is an American criminologist whose research interest is violent victimization. She is a professor and former associate dean of faculty affairs at University of Colorado Denver School of Public Affairs.

== Education ==
Rennison earned her PhD in 1997 in Political Science from the University of Houston, University Park. She also holds a BS in Psychology, MA in Sociology, and MA in Political science from the University of Houston.

== Career ==
Callie Rennison is the Director of Equity, and Title IX Coordinator at the University of Colorado Denver | Anschutz Medical Campus. In addition, she is a full professor, and former Associate Dean of Faculty Affairs in the School of Public Affairs, University of Colorado Denver. She was previously Assistant Professor, Department of Criminology and Criminal Justice, University of Missouri - Saint Louis (UMSL).

She studies violence against women.

== Regent of the University of Colorado ==
In the 2020 general election, Rennison was elected to represent the 2nd district of the University of Colorado Board of Regents. A Democrat, Rennison defeated her Republican and Libertarian opponents, winning 60% of the vote. Her six-year term expires in 2027.

== Select publications ==
- Rennison, Callie Marie; Hart, Thomas C. (2022). Research Methods in Criminal Justice (2nd ed.). Thousand Oaks, CA: SAGE Publications. ISBN 9781071815359.
- Rennison, Callie Marie; Dodge, Mary (2021). Introduction to Criminal Justice: Systems, Diversity, and Change (4th ed.). Thousand Oaks, CA: SAGE Publications. ISBN 9781544398730.
- Rennison, Callie; Bonomi, Amy, eds. (2019). Women Leading Change in Academia: Breaking the Glass Ceiling, Cliff, and Slipper. Solana Beach, CA: Cognella. ISBN 9781516548255.
- DeKeseredy, Walter S.; Rennison, Callie Marie; Hall-Sanchez, Amanda K. (2019). The Routledge International Handbook of Violence Studies. Routledge. ISBN 9780367580445.
- Cuevas, Carlos A.; Rennison, Callie Marie (2016). The Wiley Handbook on the Psychology of Violence. Wiley. ISBN 9781118303153.
