= Jerry Kopel =

American politician

Gerald "Jerry" Kopel (June 16, 1928 - January 21, 2012) was a journalist, lawyer, state legislator, and columnist in Colorado. He served 22 years in the Colorado House of Representatives (1965–1967, 1971–1977 and 1979–1993). He wrote Rules for State Legislators: Jerry Kopel's Guide with his son David Kopel, a lawyer and Washington Post columnist. Kopel became known as "Mr. Colorado Legislature" and wrote a weekly column in The Colorado Statesman newspaper from 1992 until his death in 2012.

Kopel was born in Baltimore, Maryland. He joined the army after high school, served with the Army Corps of Engineers in Panama, was sickened with malaria, and was honorably discharged.

He studied journalism at the University of Colorado and edited its Silver and Gold newspaper. His future wife Dolores was a reporter for the publication. He got a job with The World-Independent in Walsenburg and then the Rocky Mountain News in Denver.

Next, he graduated from Denver University Law School and opened the firm of Kopel & Kopel with his wife.

He was involved in highlighting the plight of Russian Jews and Christians, focusing attention on the Leningrad Three. He also worked to help establish the Martin Luther King Jr. Day in Colorado.

He was a Democrat and lived in Denver. Dolores Kopel was his wife. He has grandchildren.
