= University of Colorado Board of Regents =

Governing board of the University of Colorado system

The Regents of the University of Colorado is the governing board of the University of Colorado system, the system of public universities in the U.S. state of Colorado. Established under Article IX, Section 12 of the Constitution of Colorado, it has nine voting members. The board also has three non-voting representatives that represent the students, staff, and faculty of the CU system.

The regents oversee the university's budget, hire the university's president and other top university officials, and set tuition and priorities. They select a chair and vice-chair from their own membership.

== Current members ==
University of Colorado Board of Regents
District	Name	Party	Start	Next Election
At large	Elliott Hood	Democratic	January 7, 2025	2030
1st	Wanda James	Democratic	January 5, 2023	2028
2nd	Callie Rennison, vice chair	Democratic	January 7, 2021	2026 (retiring)
3rd	Ray Scott	Republican	January 7, 2025	2030
4th	Frank McNulty	Republican	January 5, 2023	2028
5th	Ken Montera, chair	Republican	January 5, 2022 (appointed)	2030
6th	Ilana Spiegel	Democratic	January 7, 2021	2026
7th	Nolbert Chavez	Democratic	January 7, 2021	2026
8th	Mark VanDriel	Republican	January 5, 2023	2028

== Campuses ==
The four campuses in the University of Colorado system are:

- University of Colorado Boulder
- University of Colorado Denver
- University of Colorado Colorado Springs
- University of Colorado Anschutz Medical Campus

== Elections ==
- 2018 University of Colorado Board of Regents election
- 2020 University of Colorado Board of Regents election
- 2022 University of Colorado Board of Regents election
- 2026 University of Colorado Board of Regents election
