= Nolbert Chavez =

American politician

Member of the University of Colorado Board of Regents from the 7th district
- Incumbent
- Assumed office January 7, 2021
- Preceded by: Irene Griego

Member of the Colorado House of Representatives from the 5th district
- In office January 11, 1995 – January 8, 2003
- Preceded by: Celina Benavidez
- Succeeded by: Joel Judd

Personal details
- Born: October 18, 1967 (age 58) Alamosa, Colorado, U.S.
- Party: Democratic
- Education: University of Phoenix (BA); University of Colorado, Denver (MA)

Nolbert Chavez (born October 18, 1967) is an American politician who served in the Colorado House of Representatives from the 5th district from 1995 to 2003. He has served on the University of Colorado Board of Regents from the 7th district since 2021. He is a Democrat.
