= University of Colorado Denver School of Public Affairs =

American university in Denver, Colorado

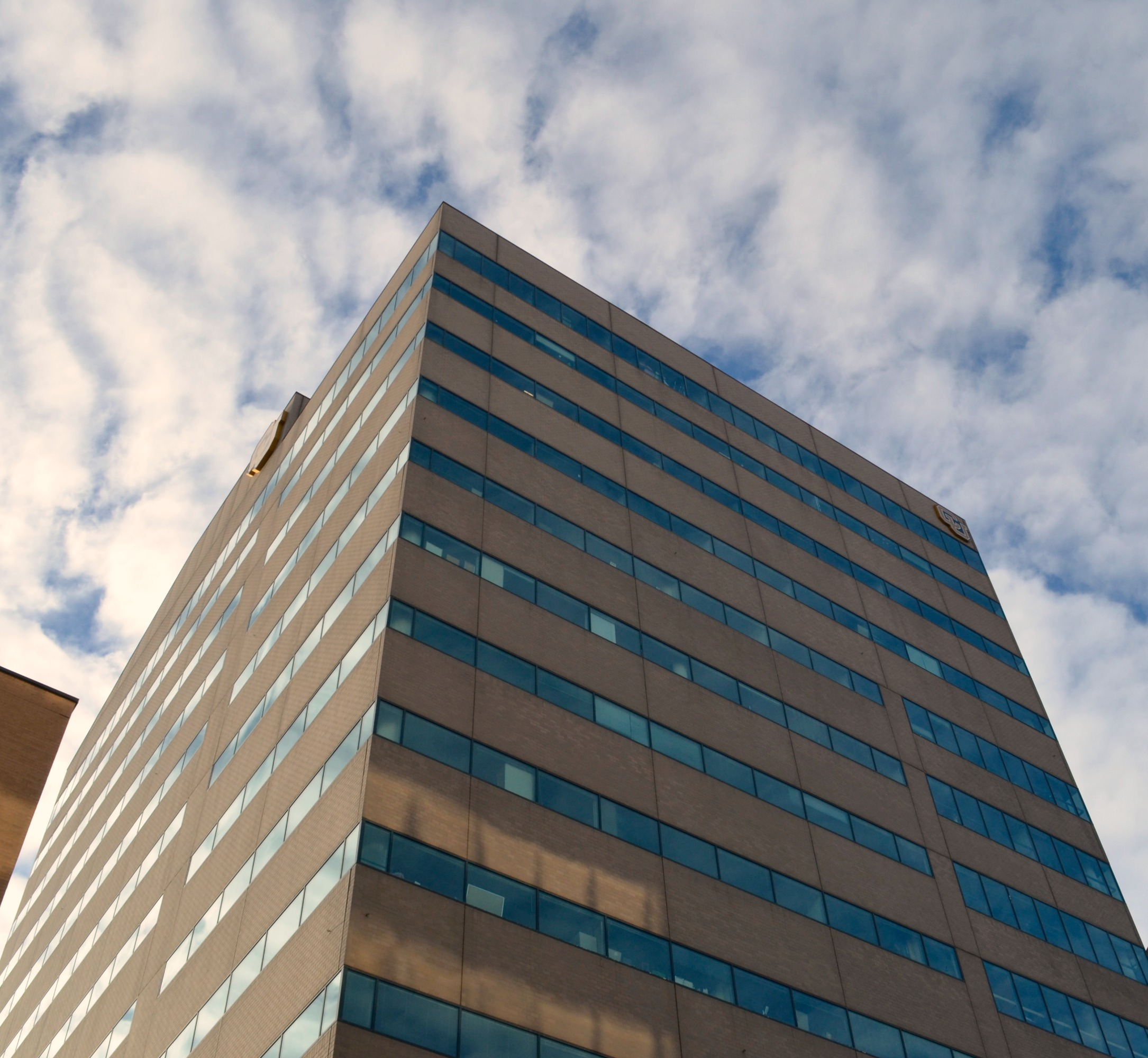
The School of Public Affairs is located on the 5th floor of the Lawrence Street Center.

The University of Colorado Denver School of Public Affairs is located in the Lower Downtown ("LoDo") district of Denver, Colorado. Accredited by the Network of Schools of Public Policy, Affairs, and Administration (NASPAA), the School offers degree programs in public administration, public affairs, public policy, and criminal justice, as well as certificates and professional development programs.

== Degree Programs ==
=== Public Affairs, Administration, and Policy ===
- Bachelor of Arts in Public Administration
- Pathways Bachelor of Arts in Public Administration / Master of Public Administration
- Master of Public Administration
- Master of Public Policy
- Dual Master of Public Administration / Master of Criminal Justice
- Dual Master of Public Administration / Master of Public Policy
- Dual Master of Public Administration / Master of Arts in Applied Geography and Geospatial Sciences
- Dual Master of Public Administration / Master of Arts in Economics
- Dual Master of Public Administration / Master of Public Health
- Dual Master of Public Administration / Master of Urban and Regional Planning
- Dual Master of Public Administration / Juris Doctor (Boulder)
- Doctor of Philosophy in Public Affairs

=== Criminal Justice ===
- Bachelor of Arts in Criminal Justice
- Pathways Bachelor of Arts in Criminal Justice / Master of Criminal Justice
- Pathways Bachelor of Arts in Criminal Justice / Master of Public Policy
- Master of Criminal Justice
- Dual Master of Criminal Justice / Master of Public Administration

== Professional Development Programs ==
- Colorado Certified Public Manager Program
- Colorado Education Policy Fellow Program
- Denver Community Leadership Forum
- Parks and Recreation Emerging Professionals Program
- Rocky Mountain Leadership Program
- Summer Institute in Education Systems Leadership Policy

== Dean ==
Paul Teske, a University of Colorado Distinguished Professor, was appointed Dean of the School in July 2008. Prior to his appointment as Dean, Teske served as the Director of the Center for Education Policy Analysis and Director of the Center on Reinventing Public Education at the School of Public Affairs, in addition to his teaching and research activities as a professor. He earned his PhD and MPA degrees in Public Affairs from the Woodrow Wilson School of Public and International Affairs at Princeton University. Teske received a BA in Economics and Political Science, with highest honors in economics, from the University of North Carolina at Chapel Hill, where he was a James Johnston Scholar and Phi Beta Kappa.

== Research centers ==
- Center for Community Safety and Resilience
- Center for Education Policy Analysis
- Center for Local Government
- Center for Policy and Democracy
- Center on Network Science
- Wirth Chair in Sustainable Development
