= The Colorado Statesman =

Weekly political newspaper in Denver

Colorado Statesman
- Type: Weekly newspaper
- Founded: 1889
- Ceased publication: 2017
- City: Denver
- Country: United States
- Website: www.coloradostatesman.com www.coloradopolitics.com

The Colorado Statesman was a weekly political newspaper published in Denver and was one of the oldest continuously published newspapers in Colorado. The Statesman covered the Colorado General Assembly, state government, public policy issues, campaigns and elections, the state’s political parties, and the people and personalities behind them. It was formerly known as the Denver Democrat and The Colorado Democrat. The paper was succeeded to the name Colorado Politics in 2017.

== History ==
It was founded in 1889. In the newspapers early history it became part of the Denver Democrat newspaper; followed by a name change to The Colorado Democrat in the mid-1950s; and by 1977 it was renamed The Colorado Statesman.

In the 1970s, the paper was owned by Cheryl Meyer and Walt Kinderman, who had hired Jody Hope Strogoff as a reporter. In 1980, Bob Sweeney bought the paper. In 1984, Sweeney sold the paper to Strogoff. By 1990, Larry Mizel, a wealthy, politically connected GOP donor became a partial owner.

Strogoff told Columbia Journalism Review that the newspaper at that time "became non-partisan and found that in a politically divided state like Colorado, the power players all along the political spectrum, as well as bureaucrats, like the Statesman’s coverage." Strogoff stepped down as publisher on February 22, 2015, following a 35-year career. Former Colorado State Representative Jared Wright, the newspaper's contract cartoonist, assumed the publisher's role. Former state Rep. Gerald Kopel, "Mr. Colorado Legislature," wrote a weekly column in the newspaper from 1992 until his death in 2012.

On February 4, 2016, the newspaper placed the bulk of its online content behind a paywall, restricting its access primarily to paid subscribers only. In June 2017, the paper announced that it had merged with Clarity Media Corporation's Coloradopolitics.com. The branding associated with the Statesman was abandoned in favor of the Coloradopolitics.com brand.
