= 2020 Colorado Proposition 114 =

Proposition 114
- Reintroduction and Management of Gray Wolves

Results
Choice	Votes	%
Yes	1,590,299	50.91%
No	1,533,313	49.09%
Valid votes	3,123,612	94.89%
Invalid or blank votes	168,049	5.11%
Total votes	3,291,661	100.00%
Registered voters/turnout	4,211,531	78.16%

For
80–90%
70–80%
60–70%
50–60%
Against
90–100%
80–90%
70–80%
60–70%
50–60%
Other
Tie
No data

Colorado Proposition 114 (also the Reintroduction and Management of Gray Wolves Proposition, and formerly Initiative #107) was a ballot measure that was approved in Colorado in the November 2020 elections. It was a proposal to reintroduce the gray wolf back into the state. The proposition was passed with a narrow margin, making Colorado the first US state to pass legislation to reintroduce wildlife.

== Background and proposal ==
Gray wolves are native to North America, including Colorado and were once present across the state. Overhunting of common prey (especially elk) and an increase in livestock numbers forced them into conflict with ranchers. Wolves were hunted, trapped and poisoned into local extinction by the 1940s.

The Colorado Parks and Wildlife Commission rejected a proposal to reintroduce the gray wolf in 2016, citing the potential impact on big game and livestock ranching in the state as well as the fact that the national gray wolf population elsewhere had already exceeded federal conservation goals. Resolutions by the Commission opposing reintroduction had also been passed in 1982 and 1989.

Proposition 114 was instigated through ballot initiative as Initiative #107. Rocky Mountain Wolf Action Fund claimed in December 2019 that they had gathered 211,000 signatures in support of Initiative #107. In January 2020 it was confirmed that the initiative had collected 139,333 valid signatures, above the 124,632 signatures needed to be included in the 2020 elections.

Proposition 114 directs the Colorado Parks and Wildlife Commission to:

- Develop plans to begin to reintroduce and manage gray wolves in designated areas in Colorado west of the Continental Divide by December 31, 2023.
- Hold hearings across the state on scientific, economic and social considerations.
- Periodically update the plan using public input.
- Use state funds to help livestock owners adapt to prevent conflict with wolf populations, and to pay fair compensation for livestock losses to gray wolves.

Almost all the potential core wolf habitat is in the west of Colorado, in or to the west of the Southern Rocky Mountains, whereas the state's most populous areas are more to the east. The proposals were estimated to cost between $5 million and $6 million over six years.

== Campaign ==
=== Support ===
The Rocky Mountain Wolf Action Fund led the campaign in support of Proposition 114.

It was argued that wolves would "restore Colorado's natural balance", and that reintroduction was needed to counter the effects of the gray wolf's protections under the Endangered Species Act being removed in October 2020. Mike Phillips, a wolf biologist, said that having gray wolves in Colorado again would "serve as the archstone" in connecting wolf populations to the north and south.

==== Endorsements ====
'Yes'

Individuals

- Dominique Jackson, member of the Colorado House of Representatives for District 42
- Leilani Munter, environmental activist and former racing driver
- Mike Phillips, member of the Montana Senate and wolf biologist

Newspapers

- Denver Post
- Boulder Weekly
- Colorado Springs Independent

Organisations

- Colorado Sierra Club
- In Defense of Animals
- Oceanic Preservation Society
- Our Revolution
- Working Families Party

=== Opposition ===
Stop The Wolf PAC led the campaign against Proposition 114.

It was argued that the proposition would have negative effects on ranchers like past propositions, such as one in the 1990s which banned hunting by trapping, snare or poison. Some opponents of the proposition argued that wolves should naturally repopulate the state rather than state agencies interfering.

By October 2020, 39 of Colorado's 64 counties adopted resolutions opposing the measure.

==== Endorsements ====
'No'

Individuals

- Bob Beauprez, former member of the U.S. House of Representatives for Colorado's 7th district (2003–2007)
- Ted Harvey, former member of the Colorado Senate (2007–2015) and the Colorado House of Representatives (2001–2006)
- Mark Hillman, former State Senator (1998–2005) and former Colorado State Treasurer (2005–2006)
- Ted Nugent, singer-songwriter

Newspapers

- Colorado Springs Gazette
- Fort Morgan Times
- Journal-Advocate
- Steamboat Pilot & Today
- Sentinel Colorado

Organisations

- Congressional Sportsmen's Foundation
- Rocky Mountain Elk Foundation
- Safari Club International

=== Neutral ===
Neutral
- League of Women Voters Colorado

== Results ==
=== Statewide ===
Proposition 114
Choice	Votes	%
For	1,590,299	50.91
Against	1,533,313	49.09
Total	3,123,612	100.00
Valid votes	3,123,612	94.89
Invalid/blank votes	168,049	5.11
Total votes	3,291,661	100.00
Registered voters/turnout	4,211,531	78.16

=== By county ===
County	Yes votes	No votes	Yes (%)	No (%)	Valid votes	Turnout (%)
Adams	117,002	107,937	52.01%	47.99%	224,939	75.58%
Alamosa	2,853	4,728	37.63%	62.37%	7,581	72.45%
Arapahoe	178,704	155,486	53.47%	46.53%	334,190	77.07%
Archuleta	3,119	5,638	35.62%	64.38%	8,757	76.82%
Baca	394	1,724	18.60%	81.40%	2,118	75.72%
Bent	743	1,457	33.77%	66.23%	2,200	68.73%
Boulder	132,607	62,955	67.81%	32.19%	195,562	81.68%
Broomfield	24,774	20,147	55.15%	44.85%	44,921	82.49%
Chaffee	5,861	7,439	44.07%	55.93%	13,300	81.29%
Cheyenne	221	891	19.87%	80.13%	1,112	80.25%
Clear Creek	3,162	3,226	49.50%	50.50%	6,388	76.93%
Conejos	1,064	3,079	25.68%	74.32%	4,143	79.07%
Costilla	922	1,004	47.87%	52.13%	1,926	70.69%
Crowley	540	1,156	31.84%	68.16%	1,696	74.93%
Custer	1,160	2,373	32.83%	67.17%	3,533	82.21%
Delta	4,668	14,194	24.75%	75.25%	18,862	81.95%
Denver	249,877	126,776	66.34%	33.66%	376,653	76.24%
Dolores	302	1,119	21.25%	78.75%	1,421	76.40%
Douglas	100,221	121,816	45.14%	54.86%	222,037	84.43%
Eagle	13,067	14,987	46.58%	53.42%	28,054	77.53%
El Paso	185,854	177,977	51.08%	48.92%	363,831	74.15%
Elbert	5,383	13,210	28.95%	71.05%	18,593	84.37%
Fremont	9,308	15,573	37.41%	62.59%	24,881	77.76%
Garfield	11,039	18,974	36.78%	63.22%	30,013	76.73%
Gilpin	1,965	2,167	47.56%	52.44%	4,132	74.96%
Grand	3,424	6,135	35.82%	64.18%	9,559	75.56%
Gunnison	4,676	6,201	42.99%	57.01%	10,877	78.15%
Hinsdale	174	439	28.38%	71.62%	613	80.71%
Huerfano	1,851	2,403	43.51%	56.49%	4,254	76.99%
Jackson	112	747	13.04%	86.96%	859	69.89%
Jefferson	185,173	177,016	51.13%	48.87%	362,189	83.01%
Kiowa	148	726	16.93%	83.07%	874	84.17%
Kit Carson	754	2,984	20.17%	79.83%	3,738	76.53%
La Plata	18,015	16,140	52.74%	47.26%	34,155	73.83%
Lake	1,767	2,063	46.14%	53.86%	3,830	67.75%
Larimer	111,344	104,020	51.70%	48.30%	215,364	80.73%
Las Animas	3,034	4,633	39.57%	60.43%	7,667	69.08%
Lincoln	549	2,024	21.34%	78.66%	2,573	77.65%
Logan	2,686	7,538	26.27%	73.73%	10,224	79.49%
Mesa	26,808	61,004	30.53%	69.47%	87,812	76.85%
Mineral	200	537	27.14%	72.86%	737	81.86%
Moffat	1,147	5,699	16.75%	83.25%	6,846	72.76%
Montezuma	5,529	9,492	36.81%	63.19%	15,021	73.45%
Montrose	5,730	18,414	23.73%	76.27%	24,144	80.65%
Morgan	3,990	9,331	29.95%	70.05%	13,321	75.71%
Otero	3,270	6,054	35.07%	64.93%	9,324	74.22%
Ouray	1,836	2,056	47.17%	52.83%	3,892	82.52%
Park	4,575	7,356	38.35%	61.65%	11,931	76.47%
Phillips	541	1,853	22.60%	77.40%	2,394	73.86%
Pitkin	6,976	4,330	61.70%	38.30%	11,306	79.48%
Prowers	1,473	3,891	27.46%	72.54%	5,364	72.66%
Pueblo	41,430	43,796	48.61%	51.39%	85,226	74.58%
Rio Blanco	439	3,164	12.18%	87.82%	3,603	77.89%
Rio Grande	1,838	4,306	29.92%	70.08%	6,144	74.39%
Routt	6,005	10,297	36.84%	63.16%	16,302	79.33%
Saguache	1,532	1,710	47.25%	52.75%	3,242	72.77%
San Juan	300	231	56.50%	43.50%	531	73.96%
San Miguel	3,140	1,774	63.90%	36.10%	4,914	77.88%
Sedgwick	357	1,027	25.79%	74.21%	1,384	76.81%
Summit	9,593	8,036	54.42%	45.58%	17,629	72.95%
Teller	6,871	9,592	41.74%	58.26%	16,463	77.56%
Washington	497	2,429	16.99%	83.01%	2,926	82.24%
Weld	66,806	93,915	41.57%	58.43%	160,721	77.62%
Yuma	899	3,917	18.67%	81.33%	4,816	81.32%

== Aftermath ==
In the 2021 regular session of the Colorado Legislature, HB21-1037 was introduced by Representative Matt Soper and Senators Bob Rankin and Ray Scott. The bill sought to limit the areas where the wolves are reintroduced into, to those which voted for Proposition 114 and those which are not home to animals which are the prey of gray wolves and designated by Colorado Parks and Wildlife to be threatened or endangered. A non-partisan analysis from legislative staff commented that the bill "would appear to rule out any reintroduction". The bill failed to progress from the Colorado House Energy and Environment Committee in February 2021.

The first phase of public involvement in reintroduction efforts was undertaken from July to August 2021, including a schedule of over 40 meetings and focus groups.

== See also ==
- List of Colorado ballot measures
