= Groupe des écoles des mines =

Group of French engineering schools

The Groupe des écoles des mines (French pronunciation: [ɡʁup dez‿ekɔl de min]; abbr. GEM) is a group of 8 Institut Mines-Telecom (IMT) engineering schools that are Grandes Écoles, a French institution of higher education that is separate from, but parallel and connected to the main framework of the French public university system. Similar to the Ivy League in the United States, Oxbridge in the UK, and C9 League in China, Grandes Écoles are elite academic institutions that admit students through an extremely competitive process. Alums go on to occupy elite positions within government, administration, and corporate firms in France.

Although the IMT engineering schools are more expensive than public universities in France, Grandes Écoles typically have much smaller class sizes and student bodies, and many of their programs are taught in English. International internships, study abroad opportunities, and close ties with government and the corporate world are a hallmark of the Grandes Écoles. Many of the top ranked schools in Europe are members of the Conférence des Grandes Écoles (CGE), as are the IMT engineering schools. Degrees from the IMT are accredited by the Conférence des Grandes Écoles and awarded by the Ministry of National Education (France) (French: Le Ministère de L'éducation Nationale).

== Members ==
- École Nationale Supérieure des Mines d'Albi-Carmaux
- École Nationale Supérieure des Mines d'Alès
- École Nationale Supérieure des Mines de Douai
- École Nationale Supérieure des Mines de Nancy
- École Nationale Supérieure des Mines de Nantes
- École Nationale Supérieure des Mines de Paris
- École Nationale Supérieure des Mines de Saint-Etienne
- École Nationale Supérieure des Mines de Rabat
