= École nationale supérieure =

The École nationale supérieure is a French institute of higher learning.

- École nationale supérieure des Beaux-Arts, Paris
- École nationale supérieure des mines de Saint-Étienne
- École nationale supérieure Louis-Lumière, Paris
- École nationale supérieure des mines de Nancy
- École nationale supérieure des arts décoratifs, Paris
- École nationale supérieure des Mines de Paris
- École nationale supérieure de l'électronique et de ses applications, Cergy-Pontoise
- École nationale supérieure des mines de Nantes
- École nationale supérieure de techniques avancées Bretagne, Brest
- École nationale supérieure de Techniques Avancées
- École Nationale Supérieure d'Arts et Métiers
