= TELECOM Lille 1 =

Telecom engineering school in Lille, France

Coordinates: 50°36′40″N 3°08′04″E

TELECOM Lille
- Motto: Avenir Ingénieur
- Type: Public, Grandes Ecoles; Grands établissements
- Established: 1990
- Director: Narendra Jussien
- Academic staff: 70
- Students: 650
- Location: Lille, Villeneuve-d'Ascq, France
- Website: http://www.imt-lille-douai.fr/en/

TELECOM Lille (formerly ENIC) was a French public Grande école (engineering school). In 2017, TELECOM Lille merges with the École des Mines Douai and becomes École des Mines-Télécom de Lille-Douai (IMT Lille Douai).

TELECOM Lille was located on the science campus of the University of Lille in Villeneuve d'Ascq near Lille. TELECOM Lille was part of Institut Mines-Télécom (IMT).

== History ==
Founded in 1990, ENIC (École Nouvelle d'Ingénieurs en Communication, Novel School In Communication) was created to answer the growing need for engineers having both technical and management skills. From the beginning, the school was built around a dual education system, in which professional internships are part of the school curriculum. This is still an essential aspect of the school training today.

In the years 2000, a new apprenticeship curriculum was created for students willing to spend half of their time in a company and the other half at school. The school has also developed a strong expertise in e-learning. The TuttelVisio and TuttelNet platforms have trained dozens of engineers every year since 2000.

In 2001, in order to reflect its membership to the world of Telecommunication and Information science, the school adopted the transitional name ENIC TELECOM Lille eventually adopting, on 22 December 2002, its official name, TELECOM Lille. Until 2006, the engineering degree was delivered jointly by University of Lille and Institut national des télécommunications. Since then, TELECOM Lille delivers the engineering degree in its own name.

In 2017, TELECOM Lille merges with the École des Mines Douai and becomes École des Mines-Télécom de Lille-Douai (IMT Lille Douai).

== Admission ==
With regards to the selection of students who successfully received their scientific high school diploma and wish to enroll the school initial curriculum, TELECOM Lille relies on the GEIPI (Groupement d'écoles d'ingénieurs publiques à parcours intégré) entrance examination, a joint entrance examination between several public engineering schools. However, the school operates its own screening process when it comes to the selection of students who wish to enroll the school apprenticeship curriculum or continuing training curriculum.

== Studies ==
Studies at TELECOM Lille encompass a wide range of fields related to Telecommunication such as Electronics, Computer science, Networking, Information Systems, Multimedia but also Human sciences, Management, Project management and two compulsory foreign languages (usually English and, Spanish or German). Depending on their background, students can enroll one of several curricula.

=== Curricula ===
==== Initial Curriculum ====
The initial curriculum (Formation Initiale, FI) is a five-year training which targets high school students who successfully passed their scientific high school diploma. It is split into the core curriculum and the engineering curriculum. The core curriculum, which lasts for two years, allows student to acquire the required knowledge in Mathematics, Physics, Electronics, Computer science and Economics. The engineering curriculum, which last for three years, is composed of three semesters that are common to all students as well as two scientific majors and one management major which students can choose. Several professional internships are required throughout the curriculum. During those five years, students may take one year off in order to study or do an internship abroad.

==== Apprenticeship Curriculum ====
The apprenticeship curriculum is a three-year training which targets students who already have a two-year degree such as DUT or BTS. Students are apprentice and spend half of their time in a company and the other half at school.

==== Continuing training curriculum ====
The continuing training curriculum (Formation continue, FP) targets people who already have a two-year degree or more and who have at least three years of professional experience. The intensive training is followed full-time and can last from two to three years, depending on whether the "level upgrading" course was followed or not.

==== E-learning continuing training curriculum ====
This curriculum is similar to the previous one. However, courses are followed using the e-learning technology TuTelNet (TTN).

=== Majors ===
Depending on their curriculum, students can choose one or two scientific majors, in addition to one management major.

==== Scientific and technological majors ====
- Computer Networking (Réseaux et Interconnexion d'Ordinateurs, RIO)
- Software Engineering (Ingénierie des logiciels, ILOG)
- Image Signal Digital Television (Image Signal et Télévision Numérique, ISTN)
- Network and System Security (Sécurité des Réseaux et Systèmes, SRS)
- Multimedia Software Engineering (Ingénierie et Informatique pour le Multimédia, IIM)
- Optical Systems and Micro-waves Engineering (Ingénierie des Systèmes Optiques et Micro-ondes, ISOM)
- Mobile Communications (Communications avec les Mobiles, CM)
- Service Integration and System Infrastructures (Intégration des Services et Infrastructures Systèmes, ISIS)

==== Management majors ====
- Information Technology Marketing (MarKeting des Technologies de l'Information, MKTI)
- International Management and Project Leadership (Management de l'International et Conduite de Projet, MICP)
- Design and Management of Information Systems (Conception et Gestion des Systèmes d'Information, CGSI)
- Entrepreneurship and Consulting (Entrepreneuriat et Consultance, EC)
- Team and Technical Environment Skill Management (Management des Equipes et des Compétences en Environnement des Technologies, MECET)

== Teaching staff ==
The teaching staff at TELECOM Lille is composed of professors and assistant professors ("maîtres de conférences") from University of Lille as well as professors from Telecom & Management SudParis or TELECOM Lille . The school also often calls upon the services of professional experts in their field.
