= École des mines d'Albi-Carmaux =

French engineering school

IMT Mines Albi
- École des Mines d'Albi-Carmaux
- Other names: ENSTIMAC, Mines Albi
- Type: Grande école d'ingénieurs (public research university Engineering school)
- Established: 1993; 33 years ago
- Parent institution: Institut Mines-Télécom
- Academic affiliations: Conférence des Grandes écoles Federal University of Toulouse Midi-Pyrénées; Toulouse Tech
- Budget: €30 million
- Director: Lionel LUQUIN
- Academic staff: 335; 151 female 81 research fellows 21 R&D engineers
- Students: 1011; 38% female 20% international 87 Ph.D.
- Location: Albi, France; 43.9221703°N 2.1777499°E
- Language: English-only & French-only instruction
- Website: www.mines-albi.fr

IMT Mines Albi, France

The École des Mines d'Albi (officially École Nationale Supérieure des Mines d'Albi-Carmaux, also known as EMAC or Mines Albi, ex-ENSTIMAC) was created in 1993. It is a French engineering school (i.e. Grandes écoles) part of the Groupe des écoles des mines and joined the Institut Mines-Télécom the first of March 2012. The school is located in the city of Albi on a 22 hectares campus.

== Overview ==
IMT Mines Albi is one of several engineering schools within the Institut Mines-Télécom, a Grand Établissement (EPCSCP) under the supervision of the Ministry of the Economy and Finance (France) (French: Ministre de l'Économie et des Finances. All Institut Mines-Telecom (IMT) engineering schools are Grandes Écoles, a French institution of higher education that is separate from, but parallel and connected to the main framework of the French public university system. Similar to the Ivy League in the United States, Oxbridge in the UK, and C9 League in China, Grandes Écoles are elite academic institutions that admit students through an extremely competitive process. Alums go on to occupy elite positions within government, administration, and corporate firms in France.

Although the IMT engineering schools are more expensive than public universities in France, Grandes Écoles typically have much smaller class sizes and student bodies, and many of their programs are taught in English. International internships, study abroad opportunities, and close ties with government and the corporate world are a hallmark of the Grandes Écoles. Many of the top ranked schools in Europe are members of the Conférence des Grandes Écoles (CGE), as are the IMT engineering schools. Degrees from the IMT are accredited by the Conférence des Grandes Écoles and awarded by the Ministry of National Education (France) (French: Le Ministère de L'éducation Nationale).

== Education ==
The school put innovation and sustainable development at the core of its curriculum. Since 2011, the curriculum last 3 years (instead of 4 years before). The school is a generalist engineering school. Students are trained in diverse technical disciplines as well as in economics and social sciences.

Students can choose between four main fields which are deeply explored during the last 2 year :

- Eco-activities and Energy
- Bio-Health-Engineering
- Advanced materials and structure engineering
- Industrial engineering, Processes and Information Systems

The school developed partnerships with engineering schools and universities from the Midi-Pyrénées region to enable students to follow a research curriculum as a preparation for doctorate studies.

Since October 2008, the school offers a three-year part-time training. This training is mixing courses on the campus (14 weeks per year) with distance learning (160 hours per year) and a work position (38 weeks per year).

In 2011, the Commission des Titres d'Ingénieur (CTI) renewed for six years the school's accreditation to deliver the Diplôme d'Ingénieur.

== Research ==
The school hosts the laboratories for three research centers :

- The RAPSODEE Center carries out research into product-oriented process engineering. Its name stands for Research Centre in Particulate Solid Process Engineering, Energy and Environment.
- The Institut Clément Ader, specialised in the study of structures, systems and mechanical processes. This laboratory is mainly focused on the fields of aeronautics, space, transportation and energy.
- The Industrial Engineering Center, interested in the kinetics of organizations for the development of decision support methods and tools in heterogeneous, collaborative and uncertain contexts.

== Other schools of Mines in France ==
- École des Mines d'Ales
- École des Mines de Douai
- École des Mines de Nancy
- École des Mines de Nantes
- Ecole des Mines de Paris
- École des Mines de Saint-Étienne
- École Nationale Supérieure des Mines de Rabat
