= Institut Mines-Télécom =

French public institution dedicated to Higher Education and Research

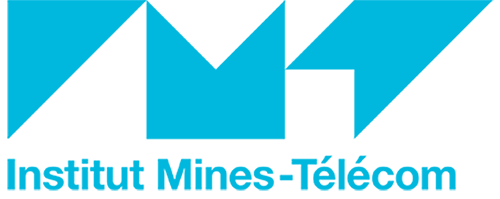
- Type: Public, Grand établissement, EPSCP
- Established: 1996
- Chancellor: Odile Gauthier
- President: Olivier Huart
- Administrative staff: 4,450
- Students: 12,300
- Postgraduates: 1,560
- Location: Albi, Alès, Brest, Douai, Evry, Gardanne, Lille, Nancy, Nantes, Rennes, Paris, Saint-Étienne and Sophia-Antipolis, France; 48.7128°N 2.2003°E
- Website: http://www.imt.fr/en/

IMT Mines campuses

The Institut Mines-Télécom (IMT) is a French institute of technology dedicated to higher education and research in the fields of engineering and digital technology. Organized as a collegiate university, it brings together the mining and telecommunications grandes écoles in France.

Created in 1996, it was originally known as the Groupe des écoles des télécommunications (GET), followed by the "Institut Télécom". The Mines schools, which were placed under the administrative supervision of the Ministry of Industry, joined the Institute in March 2012, then it took on its current name and gained the status of Grand établissement.

It combines high academia with science and is close to the capital, Paris .It focuses on Digital Affairs, Energy and Ecology, and Industry. Its training and research findings are implemented in Mines and Télécom Graduate Schools. The institution is administrated by the Ministry of the Economy and Finance.

Institut Mines-Télécom is a founding member of the Industry of Future Alliance and the University of Paris-Saclay. It maintains close relationships with the economic world and has two Carnot Institutes. Every year around one hundred startup companies leave its incubators.

The schools (grandes écoles) are accredited by the Commission des Titres d'Ingénieur (CTI) to deliver the French Diplôme d'Ingénieur.

== History ==
In 1996, the France Télécom monopoly in telecommunications ended. The group of telecommunications schools was established in the form of an Établissement public à caractère administratif (public establishment of an administrative nature), for the purpose of managing the three schools: the École nationale supérieure des télécommunications; the École nationale supérieure des télécommunications de Bretagne and the Institut national des télécommunications. The group was renamed the "Institut Télécom" in 2008. On 1 March 2012, it was renamed the "Institut Mines-Télécom" and converted to an EPCSCP - Grand Établissement. The six Mines schools under the supervision of the Ministry for the Economy, Finances and Industry joined the Institut by convention.

== Schools ==
All Institut Mines-Telecom (IMT) schools are Grandes Écoles, a French institution of higher education that is separate from, but parallel and connected to the main framework of the French public university system. Similar to the Ivy League in the United States, Oxbridge in the UK, and C9 League in China, Grandes Écoles are elite academic institutions that admit students through an extremely competitive process. Alumni go on to occupy elite positions within government, administration, and corporate firms in France.

International students often may apply directly to a Grande École after obtaining a high school or bachelors degree, but most French students apply through the Grande École program (CPGE). Unlike the public universities in which all students may enroll directly after receiving a high school diploma (baccalauréat), many French CPGE applicants, including those applying to IMT schools, must first pass a highly competitive national exam. French students can take the exam after receiving their baccalauréat, but many will first attend a two-year prépa (Classe préparatoire aux grandes écoles) and obtain 120 ECTs. Students not accepted at the Grande École of their choice will often repeat the second year of prépa and re-take the exam. Once admitted, the CPGE requires 5 years of post-baccalauréat training (Bac + 5) and ends with a Master's degree. Students accepted to a CPGE after finishing a two-year prépa will start in year 3 of the program. In 2022, annual tuition for a masters in general engineering degree was: €2,150 for European Union citizens; €4,150 for all others.

Although the IMT schools are selective and can be more expensive than public universities in France, Grandes Écoles typically have much smaller class sizes and student bodies, and many of their programs are taught in English. International internships, study abroad opportunities, and close ties with government and the corporate world are a hallmark of the Grandes Écoles. Many of the top ranked schools in Europe are members of the Conférence des Grandes Écoles (CGE), as are the IMT schools. Degrees from the Institut Mines-Telecom are accredited by the Conférence des Grandes Écoles and awarded by the Ministry of National Education (France) (French: Le Ministère de L'éducation Nationale).

Institut Mines-Télécom is composed of eight schools (Grandes Écoles):

- IMT Atlantique in Brest, Rennes, Nantes, and Toulouse (formed through the merger of Telecom Bretagne and Ecole des Mines de Nantes in 2017),
- IMT Nord Europe (ex-TELECOM Lille merged with ex-École des Mines de Douai in 2017)
- Télécom Paris in Paris and Sophia Antipolis (ex École nationale supérieure des télécommunications, Télécom Paris, or ENST)
- Télécom SudParis in Évry (ex Telecom INT)
- IMT Mines Albi-Carmaux
- IMT Mines Alès
- École nationale supérieure des mines de Saint-Étienne (Mines Saint-Étienne)
- Institut Mines-Télécom Business School in Évry and Paris (ex Telecom Business School)

== Strategic partners ==
Institut Mines-Télécom maintains close relations with strategic partners:

- ARMINES, research organization specific to the Mines schools
- École nationale supérieure des mines de Nancy, dependent on the Ministry of National Education
- Institut Des Mines De Marrakech (école des mines de Marrakech)
- TUM

== Subsidiaries ==
- EURECOM (founded in 1991, a consortium with european academic and industrial partners in Sophia Antipolis).
- inSIC (a consortium with Université de Lorraine in Saint-Dié-des-Vosges).

== Associate schools ==
Institut Mines-Télécom also includes eleven associate schools:

- Télécom Nancy in Nancy (ex ESIAL).
- Télécom Saint-Étienne in Saint-Étienne.
- Télécom Physique Strasbourg (ex ENSPS) in Strasbourg.
- ENSEIRB-MATMECA in Bordeaux.
- Sup'Com in Tunis.
- INP-ENSEEIHT in Toulouse.
- ENSIIE in Évry and Strasbourg.
- ENSG in Nancy
- IFMA in Clermond-Ferrand
- ESIGELEC in Saint-Étienne du Rouvray
- Grenoble École de Management in Grenoble
- ENIB in Brest
- ENSSAT in Lannion

== Position in the higher education context in France ==
Institut Mines-Télécom is a member of several PRES

- ParisTech through its Télécom ParisTech and Mines ParisTech schools which are founding members
- Paris Sciences et Lettres - Quartier latin via Mines ParisTech
- Université européenne de Bretagne via Télécom Bretagne
- Université de Lyon via Mines Saint-Étienne (founding member)
- UniverSud Paris via Télécom École de Management and Télécom SudParis
- Université de Toulouse and Toulouse Tech via Mines Albi
- Université Montpellier Sud de France (UMSF) via Mines Alès
- University of Lille via the École des Mines-Télécom de Lille-Douai (IMT Lille Douai).
- Université Nantes Angers Le Mans (UNAM) via the École nationale supérieure des mines de Nantes (Mines Nantes) (founding member).

The Institut is also a member of the Plateau de Saclay Scientific Cooperation Foundation.

== Mobility agreement between schools ==
A mobility agreement enables students of Institut Mines-Télécom schools to complete their 3rd year of study at a different school within the Institut Mines-Télécom. The agreement involves the 10 schools of the Institut Mines-Télécom, its 2 affiliate schools, Eurecom and Télécom Lille 1, and its strategic partner, Mines Nancy. Students have access to the options and subjects available at each school.

== See also ==
- Grands établissements
- Grandes écoles
