= Télécom & Management SudParis =

Télécom & Management SudParis (TMSP)
- Télécom & Management SudParis
- Former names: INT, Institut National des Télécommunications
- Motto: Apprenons à voler ensemble
- Motto in English: Moving forward, together
- Type: Public, Grandes Écoles; Grands établissements
- Established: 1979
- Affiliations: Institut Mines-Télécom
- Academic staff: 180
- Students: 1500
- Location: Évry, France; 48.624011°N 2.443972°E
- Campus: Suburban 15 acre campus
- Website: telecom-sudparis.eu imt-bs.eu

Télécom & Management SudParis (ex - INT: Institut National des Télécommunications ) groups two French Grande École located in Évry, a town south of Paris, France. It was formerly a research centre for France Télécom, and later turned into the leading institute for higher studies and research in telecommunications technology and the management of information and communications technology.

Former member of the UniverSud Paris.

The institute is composed of:

- Télécom SudParis, an Engineering school focused on the telecommunication industry
- Institut Mines-Télécom Business School, a Business School specializing in the IT industry
- An executive education/training centre
- An international business accelerator
- A research centre

Together with Télécom ParisTech (also known as ENST or Télécom Paris), Télécom Bretagne, Télécom Lille 1, Eurecom and the Mines schools, Télécom & Management SudParis is a member of the Institut Mines-Télécom consortium (ex Institut Télécom, ex GET).

In 2008, the INT was renamed Télécom & Management SudParis in line with the strategy of Institut Télécom.

== Facilities ==
- 180 faculty staff
- 140 PhD students
- 11 teaching and research departments:
- Teaching and research departments:
  - Language and Human Science
  - Entrepreneurship, Management, Marketing and Strategy
  - Economics, Finance and Sociology
  - Information Systems
  - Advanced Research and Techniques for Multidimensional Imaging Systems (ARTEMIS)
  - Communications, Images and Information Analysis
  - Electronics and Physics
  - Computer science
  - Networks and Software
  - Networks and Multimedia mobile services
  - Telecommunications Networks

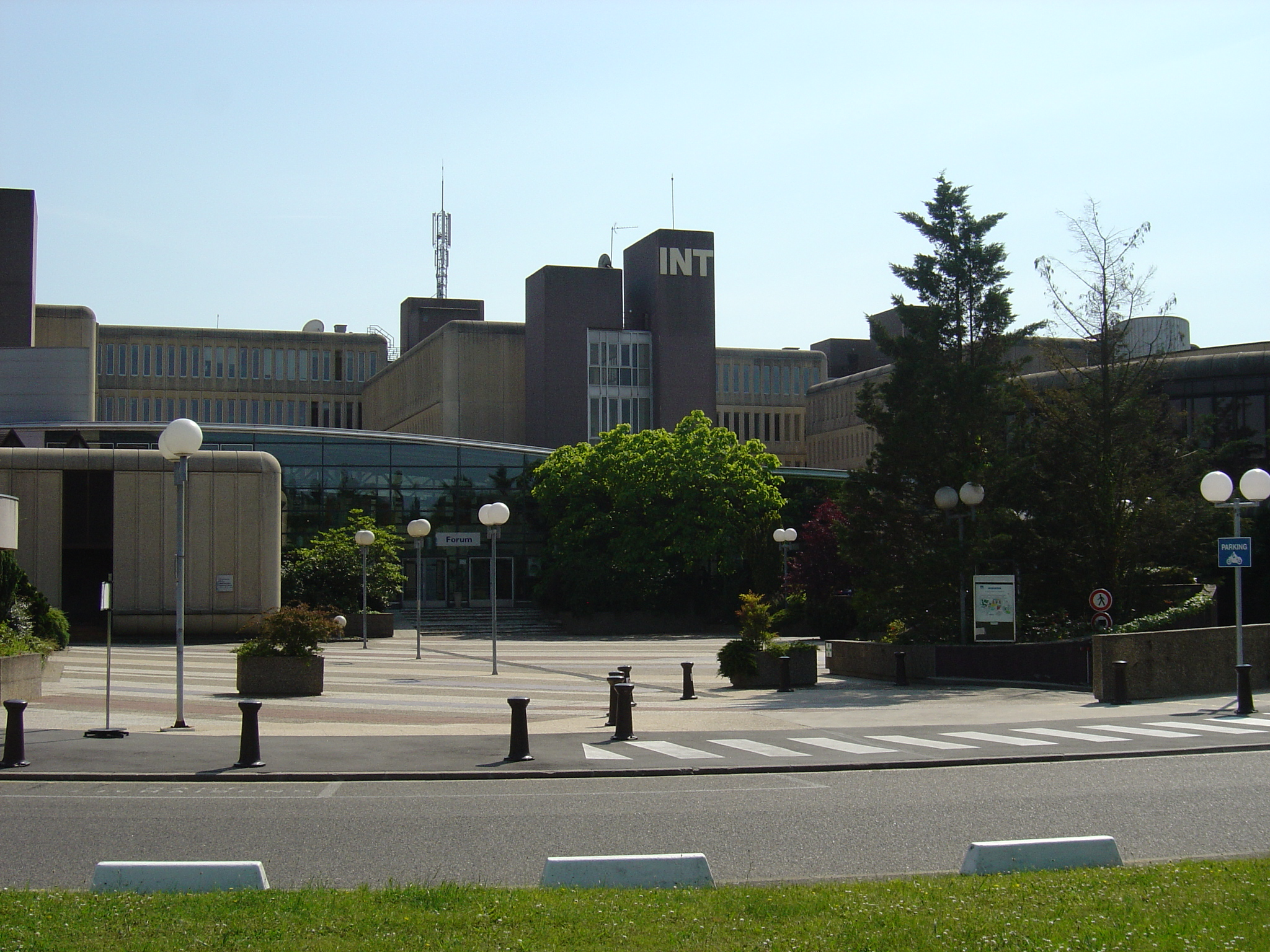
Télécom & Management SudParis main buildings
