= Télécom Saint-Étienne =

French grande école

Coordinates: 45.4517°N 4.3872°E

Télécom Saint-Etienne
- Type: Grande École
- Established: 1991
- Affiliations: Institut Telecom
- President: Jacques Fayolle
- Location: Saint-Étienne, France
- Website: http://www.telecom-st-etienne.fr/

Télécom Saint-Etienne is a French grande école in the field of telecommunications engineering. Located in Saint-Étienne. It is associated with the Institut Telecom. It is part of Jean Monnet University.

== See also ==
- Institut Telecom
