= Grands établissements =

Specific French public institution

The grands établissements (French: [ɡʁɑ̃z‿etablismɑ̃]; lit. 'great establishments') are French public institutions under ministerial charter within the administrative category referred to as Établissements publics à caractère scientifique, culturel et professionnel (EPCSP).

== Public institutions under ministerial charter within the Ministry of National Education and Research ==
Ministry of National Education, Advanced Instruction, and Research

- The Collège de France
- The Conservatoire national des arts et métiers
- The École centrale des arts et manufactures, also called École Centrale Paris or Centrale (ECP)
- The University of Lorraine, often abbreviated in UL
- The École nationale des chartes
- The École nationale de l'aviation civile (ENAC)
- The École nationale supérieure d'arts et métiers or Arts et Métiers ParisTech
- The École nationale supérieure des sciences de l'information et des bibliothèques (ENSSIB)
- The École pratique des hautes études (EPHE)
- The École des hautes études en sciences sociales (EHESS)
- The Institut d'Études Politiques de Paris, also called Sciences Po
- The Institut de Physique du Globe de Paris (IPGP)
- The Institut national des langues et civilisations orientales or Langues-O (INALCO)
- The Muséum national d'histoire naturelle (MNHN)
- The Observatoire de Paris
- The Université Paris-Dauphine or Dauphine
- The Université Paris Sciences et Lettres
- The Université Grenoble Alpes (UGA)
  - The Institut polytechnique de Grenoble or Grenoble INP (affiliated with UGA)

== Public institutions under ministerial charter within the Ministry of the Economy, Finance and Industry ==
Ministry of the Economy, Finance and Industry

- Institut Mines-Télécom (Institut Mines-Télécom, gathering Telecom ParisTech, École des Mines-Télécom de Lille-Douai (IMT Lille Douai), Telecom Bretagne, Telecom & Management SudParis (ex INT), Institut Eurécom)

== Public institutions under ministerial charter within the Ministry of Culture ==
Ministry of Culture

- The French Academy in Rome or Villa Médicis
- The Bibliothèque nationale de France (BNF)
- The Comédie-Française
- The Conservatoire national supérieur d'art dramatique (CNSAD)
- The Conservatoire national supérieur de musique et de danse de Paris (CNSMDP)'
- The École Nationale Supérieure d'Architecture de Paris-Belleville
- The École du Louvre
- The École nationale supérieure des beaux-arts or Beaux-arts (ENSBA, ENS Villa Arson)
- The École nationale supérieure des arts décoratifs (ENSAD)
- The École nationale supérieure des métiers de l'image et du son or Fémis
- The École nationale supérieure d'arts à la Villa Arson
- The École Normale de Musique de Paris

== See also ==
- Grande école
