= École des mines d'Alès =

French technology and engineering university

Coordinates: 44°07′57″N 4°05′22″E

École des Mines d'Alès
- Type: Grande école d'ingénieurs (public research university Engineering school)
- Established: 1843; 183 years ago
- Parent institution: Institut Mines-Télécom
- Academic affiliations: Conférence des Grandes écoles
- Budget: €35 million
- Director: Assia TRIA
- Students: 1,400; 250 international
- Location: Alès, France
- Campus: Alès, Nîmes, Pau
- Language: English-only & French-only instruction
- Website: www.mines-ales.fr

L'École des Mines d'Alès (French pronunciation: [ekɔl de min dalɛs]; EMA) was created in 1843 by King Louis Philippe, under the guardianship of the French Ministry of Economy, Finance and Employment, is a French technology and engineering university. From 2012, its full name changed into École Nationale Supérieure des Mines d'Alès (pronounced [ekɔl nɑsjɔnal sypeʁjœʁ de min dalɛs]). Founded in 1843, this school was originally formed for study of the mining industry. It is now an engineering school in France Grandes écoles and of the Groupe des écoles des mines.

There are three year engineering degree and master's degree programs.

== General information ==
=== History ===
L'École des Mines d'Alès (EMA) was founded in 1843.

- From 1841 to 1845: On 27 March 1841, the project of founding this school was adopted to the Municipal Conseil. In August 1841, the general Conseil emitted a positive opinion. On 22 September 1843, a royal ordonnance created this school. In November 1845, the first promotion was settled. The EMA was initially a school created to promote the development of the Alais basin. Its mission is to train competent masters for mining.
- From 1845 to 1918: She became "École Technique des Mines d'Alès". Le level of the education there improved. There were more and more candidates and the graduate students became the chefs of exploitation, engineers.

The First World War (1914–1918) forced the school to close down temporarily.

- From 1918 to 1960: The school diversified its field of education (masters for management and geometry measurement of mines, conductors of mining constructions...) but because there was not a defined diploma programme, the number of students declined. Thus, in order to attract more candidates, there was a campaign held for the reconstruction of a new school. And from 1965, a "diplôme d'ingénieur" was authorised.
- From 1960 to 1970: The school became "l'École Nationale Technique des Mines d'Alès". Before the end of the mining activities, the school had diversified its education into new industrial domains.
- From 1980, the EMA began to admit girls and promote entrepreneurship.
- In 1990, other two campus sites were established outside Alès, respectively in Nîmes and Pau.
- In 1999, the education and the research focused on these three axes:
  - Culture of the entrepreneurship
  - Incubateur technologique
  - Partnership with the technopoles.

=== Organisation ===
Institut Mines-Telecom (IMT) engineering schools are Grandes Écoles, a French institution of higher education that is separate from, but parallel and connected to the main framework of the French public university system. Similar to the Ivy League in the United States, Oxbridge in the UK, and C9 League in China, Grandes Écoles are elite academic institutions that admit students through an extremely competitive process. Alums go on to occupy elite positions within government, administration, and corporate firms in France.

Although the IMT engineering schools are more expensive than public universities in France, Grandes Écoles typically have much smaller class sizes and student bodies, and many of their programs are taught in English. International internships, study abroad opportunities, and close ties with government and the corporate world are a hallmark of the Grandes Écoles. Many of the top ranked schools in Europe are members of the Conférence des Grandes Écoles (CGE), as are the IMT engineering schools. Degrees from the IMT are accredited by the Conférence des Grandes Écoles and awarded by the Ministry of National Education (France) (French: Le Ministère de L'éducation Nationale).

=== Campus ===
The main part of the school is in the city Alès. The students' residence is around 2 km from the main campus. The residence offers individual rooms, double rooms or studios, furnished and equipped. There are also a laundry, a kitchen equipped, rooms for entertainment, a bar, an auditorium, and a TV room with campus wide internet access.

=== List of directors ===
The following is a list of directors by time period:

| Time | Director |
|---|---|
| 1845–1849 | Pierre-Jules Callon |
| 1849–1860 | Gabriel Jules Étienne Dupont |
| 1860–1862 | Jules Alexandre Alphonse Meugy |
| 1862–1869 | Edouard Victor Descottes |
| 1869–1874 | Charles Ernest Ledoux |
| 1874–1878 | Oscar Linder |
| 1878–1884 | Jules Hippolyte Julien |
| 1884–1890 | Fernand Rigaud |
| 1891–1895 | Louis Jules Caesar Ichon |
| 1895–1898 | Henri Jean Baptiste Xavier Boutiron |
| 1898–1900 | Louis Albert Laurans |
| 1900–1912 | François Jules Camille Dougados |
| 1911–1912 | Alexandre André Belugou (par intérim) |
| 1913–1924 | Joseph Marie Pierre Loiret |
| 1924–1927 | André Charles Duby |
| 1927–1936 | Jules François Gabriel Daval |
| 1937 | Pierre Jules Lafay |
| 1936–1945 | Jean Paul Louis Damian |
| 1945 | Jean-Paul Robert Bernadet |
| 1945–1948 | Louis Charles Eyssautier |
| 1948–1951 | Marcel Georges Fernand Sala |
| 1951–1960 | Jean Alfred Vuillot |
| 1960–1964 | Pierre Charles Alexis Legoux |
| 1964–1979 | Jean-Pierre Arnold Marcel Pertus |
| 1979–1982 | Marcel Gerente |
| 1982–1989 | Gustave Defrance |
| 1989–1994 | Maurice Cotte |
| 1994–2003 | Henri Pugnere |
| 2003–2013 | Alain René Georges Dorison |
| 2013–2018 | Bruno Goubet |
| 2018–2021 | Thierry De Mazancourt |
| 2021 | Pierre Perdiguier (by acting) |
| 2021- | Assia Tria |

== Education fields ==
Areas of study:

- Civil Engineering
- Engineering of Materials and Mechanics
- Information engineering
- Management of Risks and Environnement
- System and production engineering
- Mining
- Computer science
- Mecatronics

== The laboratories ==
There are three centers of research:

- Information engineering and Production engineering (LGI2P) focuses on information and communication and is located in Nîmes.
- Centre of Materials and Grand Diffusion (CMGD) focuses on mechanical structures and function materials and is situated in both alésien and palois of Hélioparc.
- Industrial Environnement and Industrialand natural Risks (LGEI) focuses on managing risks and gestion of natural resources.

Statistics in 2009:

- Doctorates: 70
- Students: 751
- Budget: 26.6 million euros
- Contracts of research: 6,1 million euros
- Effectif of laboratories: 325
- Number of articles: 686

== Clubs and associations ==
- The Circle of Students (Cercle des Élèves)
- Association Sportive (L'AS): tennis, badminton, horse-riding, swimming, table tennis, golf, escrime, football, rugby, basketball, volleyball, handball, climbing and many others.
- Emagine, the Junior-Entreprise of l'Ecole des mines, was created in 1989. Emagine is an independent entity, supported by Ecole des Mines d’Alès and its incubateur.
- Other clubs
  - There are more than 79 clubs and associations.
  - L'ATHEMA: Association of Thésards of École des Mines d'Alès.
  - robotics club: EMA'Bot.
  - AIMA (Association des Internationaux de l'Ecole des Mines d'Alès): The International Students Club
  - Le festival de la Meuh Folle: music festival taking place at the beginning of spring (8000 people on two days)
  - ISF Alès (Ingénieurs Sans Frontière)
  - Tsiky Zanaka: humanitarian association
  - EMA'IT: Computer science and development clubs

Full list on: Circle of Students Cercle des Élèves – Bureau Des Élèves – IMT Mines Alès

== See also ==
- École nationale supérieure des Mines de Nancy
- École nationale supérieure des Mines de Saint-Étienne
- École Nationale Supérieure des Mines de Rabat
- École des Mines de Douai
- École des Mines de Nantes
- École des Mines d'Albi-Carmaux
