= IMT Nord Europe =

French engineering college

Coordinates: 50.3751862°N 3.0677927°E

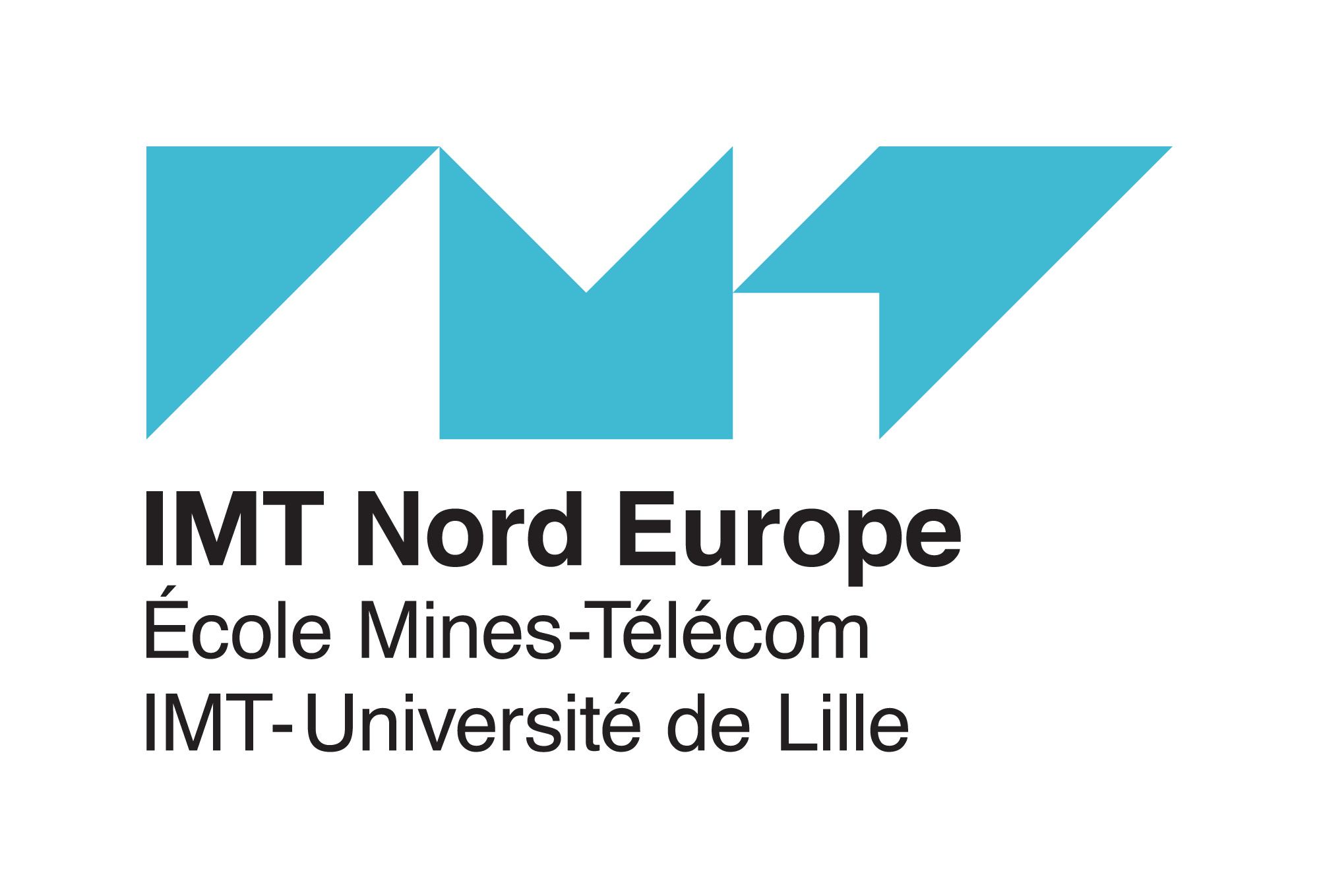
- Former names: Télécom Lille and École des Mines de Douai
- Type: Grande école d'ingénieurs (public research university Engineering school)
- Established: 1878, 1990, 2017
- Parent institution: Institut Mines-Télécom
- Academic affiliations: Conférence des Grandes écoles University of Lille; Community of Universities and Institutions (COMUE) Lille Nord de France
- President: Céline Fasulo
- Students: 2'000
- Location: Lille (Villeneuve-d'Ascq), Douai, Valenciennes, Dunkerque and Alençon, France
- Campus: University of Lille (Cité Scientifique) and Douai
- Website: http://www.imt-lille-douai.fr/en/
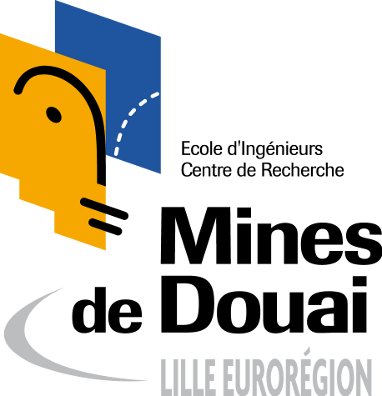

IMT Nord Europe, officially École nationale supérieure Mines-Télécom Lille Douai, is a French graduate school of engineering (grande école d'ingénieurs). It is located in the Nord department of the Hauts-de-France region, shared between 5 campuses: the science campus (cité scientifique) of the University of Lille (Villeneuve-d'Ascq, European Metropolis of Lille); the campus of Douai, the campus of Valenciennes, the campus of Dunkerque and the campus of Alençon. It is accredited by the Commission des Titres d'Ingénieur (CTI) to deliver the French Diplôme d'Ingénieur.

The school trains Master and PhD level engineers and scientists in various technological fields. Not many students are accepted each year, after a selective exam. It is an important part of the infrastructure of French industry.

It is affiliated to University of Lille and Institut Mines-Télécom (Mines-Télécom Institut of Technology - IMT).

The École des Mines de Douai merged with TELECOM Lille in 2017 to become the largest engineering school in France north of Paris under the name IMT Lille Douai, then IMT Nord Europe.

== History ==
The École des Maîtres-ouvriers mineurs de Douai was founded on 27 March 1878 on the same model as the École des mines d'Alès, founded forty years earlier. It was originally a vocational school providing for the training needs of skilled workers "Maîtres-mineurs" for the coal mining industry. Chief Engineers Lebleu and Peslin were its first directors. The number of admissions was 24 in 1878 and 20 in 1879, enough to meet demand, but fell to 15 in 1880 and averaged only 13 in the following decade. An Alumni Societe (Société amicale des anciens élèves) was founded in 1886.

On 10 February 1892 Henry Küss was entrusted with the Douai mineralogical district, including mining school, a post he held until 1906. Under Kuss the number of admissions averaged 27.5. Only candidates who had working experience as minors were admitted. To reassure critics who denounced training of civil servants and thought over-rapid improvement in the social status of workers would be dangerous, In 1905 Henry Küss stated that the pupils did "not need a very extensive scientific background, which they would anyway with very few exceptions be unable to assimilate. By 1906, out of 393 alumni whose occupations were known, 151 were supervisors and 110 were surveyors or verifiers. From 18 January 1906 graduates of the school could be appointed contrôleurs des Mines in the colonies. By 1913 more than 80 of Küss's former pupils were working in the colonies or foreign countries.

In the 1960s the school made basic changes to adapt to the recession in the coal industry. In 1965 it became a school for general engineers with two streams, Buildings/Public Works, and Mechanical/Metallurgy. Studies took four years, interspersed with five mandatory internships in companies. The school was authorized to issue an Engineering diploma in 1966. Research activity developed from the mid-1970s, and a technology incubator was founded in 1985 to support creation of innovative new businesses. In 1980 the school became the Ecole Nationale Supérieure des Mines.

The École des Mines de Douai merged with TELECOM Lille in 2017 to become the largest engineering school in France north of Paris under the name IMT Lille Douai.

== Education of IMT Nord Europe ==
All Institut Mines-Telecom (IMT) schools are Grandes Écoles, a French institution of higher education that is separate from, but parallel and connected to the main framework of the French public university system. Similar to the Ivy League in the United States, Oxbridge in the UK, and C9 League in China, Grandes Écoles are elite academic institutions that admit students through an extremely competitive process. Alums go on to occupy elite positions within government, administration, and corporate firms in France.

Although the IMT schools are more expensive than public universities in France, Grandes Écoles typically have much smaller class sizes and student bodies, and many of their programs are taught in English. International internships, study abroad opportunities, and close ties with government and the corporate world are a hallmark of the Grandes Écoles. Many of the top ranked schools in Europe are members of the Conférence des Grandes Écoles (CGE), as are the IMT schools. Degrees from the Institut Mines-Telecom are accredited by the Conférence des Grandes Écoles and awarded by the Ministry of National Education (France) (French: Le Ministère de L'éducation Nationale).

=== First year ===
The selected students have various profiles. At the beginning the school offers a training with general courses:

- Mechanical engineering, materials science, computer-aided design
- Chemical engineering, environmental stakes
- Automation engineering, signal processing
- Programming, algorithms, information technology, mathematics, analysis, probabilities, statistics,
- Sports
- Project management, team management, law, economics
- Foreign languages: English as a first mandatory language, second mandatory language (German, Spanish, Russian or Mandarin Chinese), third optional language (German, Russian, Mandarin Chinese, Japanese, Arabic, Italian, Portuguese)

During the second semester, several elective courses are offered and give students the opportunity to learn a particular subject related to engineering topics. These courses are divided into 4 sections:

- Materials, mechanics, design: Chemical properties - Steel - Glass and refractory materials - Mechanical applications - Advanced computer-aided design - Structural materials
- Chemistry, environment, energy: Organic chemistry - Petroleum engineering - Nuclear engineering - Nuclear chemistry - System optimization
- Electrical engineering, electronics, automation: Electricity & environment - Automation - Numerical signal processing - Matlab/Simulink - Programming of sequential functions
- Computer engineering and mathematics: Cryptography and secret codes - Complex analysis - Advanced Excel - Numerical analysis - Data analysis - Web programming - Introduction to ActionScript - Embedded software development

The first year is equivalent to a bachelor's degree in general engineering: students have general knowledge about several engineering topics.

=== Second year ===
The second year is the first master year. Students are required to select a minor and a major. This couple of courses gives them a very personalized educational path. There are 13 minors and 8 majors. Some minors cannot be selected with some majors.

The 13 minors (in ordinate) linked to the 8 majors (in abscissa)
	Environment and industry	Civil Engineering	Energy Engineering	Mechanical Engineering	Quality Engineering	Computer Engineering	Industrial Engineering and Industrial Automation	Technology of Polymers and Composites
Health, Quality, Environment in Civil engineering		X			X			
Statistics of measures and risks	X				X			
Techniques in Research and Development				X	X			X
Structure of Materials		X		X				X
Structural analysis		X		X				
Manufacturing and Automation				X			X	X
Acquisition, processing of measures and regulation			X				X	
Hydraulics et Hydrogeology	X	X						
Valorisation of materials	X	X	X		X			X
Renewable energies	X		X					
Mobile applications and embedded systems						X	X	
Decision Engineering					X	X	X	
Quality and security of information systems					X	X	X	

The 8 majors offered are:

- Environment and industry
- Civil Engineering
- Energy Engineering
- Mechanical Engineering
- Quality Engineering
- Computer Engineering
- Industrial Engineering and Industrial Automation
- Technology of Polymers and Composites

=== Third year ===
During the third year, in order to complete their technical knowledge students are required to study courses linked to professional positions. They have to select one group of courses among the following ones:

- Strategic Management
- Entrepreneurship
- Business and Sales
- International
- Research and Development
- Law expertise
- Logistics
- Purchasing

== Academic partnerships of Mines Douai ==
Mines Douai has a various range of academic partnerships with French and foreign universities. French students can go to a foreign university during the second year and/or the third year. They can also earn a double degree with some of the universities below. Foreign students can also come to Mines Douai.

=== Partnerships in France for an academic exchange ===
- The other Écoles des Mines: Albi, Alès, Nancy, Nantes, Paris and Saint-Étienne.
- L’École Spéciale des Travaux Publics (Paris).
- L’Institut national des sciences et techniques nucléaires (INSTN) (Saclay ou Cadarache).
- University of Lille

=== Partnerships in France for a double degree ===
- University of Lille
- Audencia (Nantes)
- Télécom École de Management (Évry)
- IFP School (Rueil-Malmaison)
- Sciences Po Paris
- Sciences Po Lille
- University of Marne-la-Vallée

=== Foreign partnerships for an academic exchange ===
- Austria: Vienna University of Technology
- Bulgaria: Technical University, Sofia
- Canada: Université de Sherbrooke
- Chile: University of Santiago, Chile
- China: Zhejiang University Hohai University
- Czech Republic: Technical University of Ostrava
- Germany : Technische Universität Berlin, Braunschweig University of Technology, Brandenburg University of Technology, Clausthal University of Technology, Bauhaus
- India: Indian Institute of Technology Delhi, Vishwakarma Institute of Technology, Pune University, Indian Institute of Technology Kanpur
- Japan: Kyoto Institute of Technology
- Morocco: National School of Mineral Industry, École nationale supérieure d'électricité et mécanique (ENSEM) de Casablanca
- Poland: Wrocław University of Technology
- Portugal: University of Minho
- Romania: University of Galați, Politehnica University of Bucharest, Gheorghe Asachi Technical University of Iași, Politehnica University of Timișoara
- Slovakia: Slovak University of Technology in Bratislava
- Spain: Polytechnic University of Catalonia, University of Zaragoza
- Switzerland: Université de Berne, ETH Zurich
- (United Kingdom) UK: Durham University

=== Foreign partnerships for a double degree ===
- Brazil: Federal University of Rio de Janeiro, Universidade Federal de Ouro Preto, Universidade Federal do Espírito Santo, Rio de Janeiro State University
- Canada: École polytechnique de Montréal, École de technologie supérieure
- China: Tsinghua University, Shanghai Jiao Tong University, Hohai University, Nanjing University of Science and Technology, Tongji University, Southeast University
- Germany: RWTH Aachen University (IKV and IKA)
- New Zealand: University of Auckland
- Russia: Bauman Moscow State Technical University, Novosibirsk State University of Architecture and Civil Engineering (Sibstrin)
- Scotland: University of the West of Scotland
- Spain: Escuela Técnica Superior de Ingenieros Industriales de Madrid
- Tunisia: École nationale d'ingénieurs de Sfax
- (United Kingdom) UK: Imperial College London, Cranfield University
- (United States) USA: University of Delaware, Georgia Institute of Technology
- Vietnam: National University of Civil Engineering

== Other schools of Mines in France and abroad ==
- École nationale supérieure des Mines d'Albi Carmaux (Mines Albi-Carmaux)
- École nationale supérieure des Mines d'Alès (Mines Alès)
- École nationale supérieure des Mines de Nancy
- École nationale supérieure des Mines de Nantes (Mines Nantes)
- École nationale supérieure des Mines de Paris (Mines ParisTech)
- École nationale supérieure des Mines de Saint-Étienne (Mines Sainte-Etienne)
- École Nationale Supérieure des Mines de Rabat (Mines Rabat)
