= UniverSud Paris =

Coordinates: 48.5000°N 2.5000°E

- UniverSud Paris
- Type: Public
- Established: 2007 - 2014
- President: Xavier Chapuisat
- Students: 60,000
- Doctoral students: 4,000
- Location: Île-de-France, France
- Nickname: UniverSud Paris
- Website: http://www.universud-paris.fr

UniverSud Paris was one of the PRES in France. It gathered 21 public universities, Grandes Écoles and National Research Center, covering nearly the whole spectrum of sciences (fundamental, engineering, business), until its dissolution in 2014.

== History ==
In 1991, the French government decided to create "French Poles of Research and Higher Education".

In 2007, its status changed to a public establishment for scientific cooperation (établissement public de coopération scientifique). It is headed by a president, assisted by an executive bureau and a secretary general, and administrated by a board of directors, assisted by a strategic orientation council and a scientific council. The board of directors gathers one representative of each college or institute as well as researchers, faculty members, and one representative of the students.

== Colleges and institutes ==
The members of UniverSud Paris are well-established, publicly owned educational and research institutions, many of which were founded back in the 18th century. Some deliver a high-level, broad education in science, such as École Polytechnique, École normale supérieure Paris-Saclay or École Centrale Paris, whereas others provide a deeper, research-focused level of expertise in select scientific disciplines, such as École Supérieure d'Électricité, Institute of Research for Development, Telecom & Management SudParis, École nationale vétérinaire d'Alfort, the French National Sequencing Center or the French particle accelerator. The highly ranked French business school HEC Paris is also a member of the UniverSud Paris.

The member colleges and institutes are:

- Paris Institute of Technology for Life, Food and Environmental Sciences (AgroParisTech), founded in 2007, as a result of the merger of three agronomy, forestry and food science schools with roots dating back to 1824
- National Veterinary School of Alfort, founded in 1765
- National School of Landscape (ENSP), founded in 1965
- National Institute of Agronomic Research (INRA), founded in 1946
- National Research Institute of Science and Technology for Environment and Agriculture (formerly Cemagref), founded in 1981
- French agency for Food, Environmental and Occupational Health Safety (ANSES), founded in 1999
- Télécom & Management Sud-Paris, founded in 1979
- Genoscope (French National Sequencing Center), founded in 1996
- National School of Computer Science for Industry and Business (ENSIIE), founded in 1968
- HEC - Paris, founded in 1881
- École Polytechnique (X), founded in 1794
- Higher School of Optics (IOGS), founded in 1917
- National School of Architecture of Versailles, founded in 1969
- SOLEIL (French particle accelerator), founded in 2006
- Institute of Research for Development (IRD), founded in 1943
- Paris-Sud 11 University, founded in 1971
- Versailles Saint-Quentin-en-Yvelines University, founded in 1991
- University of Évry Val d'Essonne, founded in 1991
- École normale supérieure Paris-Saclay, founded in 1880
- École Centrale Paris, founded in 1829
- École supérieure d'électricité (Supélec), founded in 1894

== Facts and figures ==
- 3 Nobel Prizes
- 4 Fields Medals
- 1 Galien Prize
- 60,000 students
- 4,200 full-time faculty teachers and researchers
- 4,000 PhD students in 30 doctoral schools
- 42,000 m^{2} space devoted to research

== Locations ==
It brings together 21 institutions of higher education and research in the southern part of the Île-de-France (Paris) Region. It was founded by the universities of Paris-Sud 11 University, of Versailles Saint-Quentin-en-Yvelines University and of University of Évry Val d'Essonne, as well as Ecole Centrale Paris, Supelec and École normale supérieure Paris-Saclay.

== Education ==
UniverSud Paris offers a complete range of courses, independently or in partnership with other institutions (in particular doctoral and Master's degrees), in the core disciplines of science and technology at postgraduate level. Its main programmes are:

- UniverSud Paris offers a complete range of courses, independently or in partnership with other institutions (in particular Bashelor's degrees, Master's degrees and doctorates), in the core disciplines of science and technology at postgraduate level. Its main programmes are:
- the Bachelor degrees. For the licence porfessionnelle, there is a selection process based on an examination for holders of a two-year higher education diploma (of 120 ECTS credits).
- Master degrees programmes, courses designed to provide an in-depth understanding in various fields of science ranging from Mathematics to Economics. Admission to UniverSud Paris MSc programmes is open to students holding a Bachelor of Science (BSc) or a Bachelor of Engineering (BEng) from a French or international university. Each college or institute has its own specific admissions requirements.
- Mastères spécialisés (Post-master professional certificates) enable students which have already completed a Master's degree to develop their knowledge in a speciality to a high standard.
- A full-time MBA (Master of Business Administration) ranked No. 6 in the world for the international mobility of its students.
- Doctoral programmes (PhD): UniverSud Paris laboratories play host to 4,000 doctoral students. Thesis enrolment is handled by the UniverSud Paris institute or college to which the host laboratory is attached.
- UniverSud Paris also offer continuing education courses aimed at professionals, accessible with a Bachelor or university degree, with courses to the degrees of Ingénieur, Master, Specialized Master or Doctorate.
