= École des Mines de Nantes =

Mining school of engineering

Coordinates: 47°16′56″N 1°31′15″W

École nationale supérieure des Mines de Nantes (Mines Nantes)
- Type: Grandes Ecoles
- Active: 1990–2017
- Affiliations: Institut Mines-Télécom (Mines Télécom Institut of Technology), Groupe des écoles des Mines, Conférence des Grandes Ecoles
- Location: Nantes, France
- Campus: Nantes
- Website: www.mines-nantes.fr

The École des Mines de Nantes (French pronunciation: [ekɔl de min də nɑ̃t]), or École nationale supérieure des mines de Nantes (pronounced [ekɔl nɑsjɔnal sypeʁjœʁ de min də nɑ̃t]), Mines Nantes, EMN, was a French engineering school (grande école), part of the Institut Mines-Télécom. The school was based in Nantes, in the west of France. On 1 January 2017, it merged with Télécom Bretagne to form the IMT Atlantique.

The school offers 10 majors:

- Energy (GSE)
- Decision-making software engineering (GIPAD)
- Logistics and production systems (GOPL)
- Management of Information Technologies (OMTI)
- Information Systems engineering (GSI)
- Quality and Safety (QSF)
- Automation (AII)
- Environment (GE)
- Nuclear: Technologies, Safety and Environment (NTSE)
- Nuclear: Systems and Technologies Applied to Nuclear reactors (STAR)
- Nuclear: Sustainable Nuclear Energy and Waste Management (SNEWM) - International master taught in English

The EMN has also signed agreements with Audencia Business School to offer a joint degree in management of information technologies. The school depend on the French minister of industry.

== Teaching philosophy ==
Although it offers a fairly typical education for an engineering school, the EMN strives to give its graduate a practical, pragmatic approach to the technical and business skills it teaches. Manifestations of this philosophy include programs such as the "Apprentissage par l'action" ("Learning through action"), a case-based approach to sciences that places students in front of industry-inspired puzzles and develops students' analytic skills and intellectual curiosity. The EMN is also a partner of "La main à la pâte" ("Hands in the dough"), an innovative initiative to teach sciences in primary courses supported by Georges Charpak, who won the Nobel Prize in Physics in 1992.

== Programs taught in English ==
EMN offers four Master of Science programs fully taught in English:

- MOST (MSc in Management and Optimization of Supply Chains and Transport)
- PM3E (Master of Science in Project Management for Environnemental and Energy Engineering)
- ME3 joint masters (European joint Masters in Management and Engineering of Environment and Energy) in collaboration with four other partners (UPM Madrid, KTH Stockholm, BME Budapest and Queen’s University Belfast). This program has obtained the prestigious Erasmus Mundus label of the European Union.
- SNEAM (Master of Science in Sustainable Nuclear Energy - Applications and Management)

== Other schools of Mines in France ==
- École nationale supérieure des Mines d'Albi Carmaux (Mines Albi-Carmaux)
- École nationale supérieure des Mines d'Alès (Mines Alès)
- École nationale supérieure des Mines de Douai (Mines Douai)
- École nationale supérieure des Mines de Nancy
- École nationale supérieure des Mines de Paris (Mines ParisTech)
- École nationale supérieure des Mines de Saint-Étienne (Mines Sainte-Etienne)
- École Nationale Supérieure des Mines de Rabat (Mines Rabat)
