= École nationale supérieure des mines de Nancy =

French engineering grande école

Coordinates: 48°40′24″N 6°10′18″E

Mines Nancy
- École nationale supérieure des mines de Nancy
- Former names: Institut métallurgique et minier (1919–1921); École supérieure de la métallurgie et de l'industrie des mines (1921–1951); École nationale supérieure de la métallurgie et de l'industrie des mines de Nancy (1951–1985)
- Type: Grande école
- Established: 1919
- Founders: Paul Petit, Louis Crussard
- Parent institution: University of Lorraine
- Accreditation: Commission des titres d'ingénieur (CTI)
- Affiliations: Conférence des grandes écoles (CGE), Conférence des directeurs des écoles françaises d'ingénieurs (CDEFI), Artem
- Chairperson: Anne Lauvergeon
- Directeur général: François Rousseau
- Students: ≈ 780 (2025)
- Location: Nancy and Saint-Dié-des-Vosges, France
- Campus: Urban
- Colors: Black and white
- Website: mines-nancy.univ-lorraine.fr

The École nationale supérieure des mines de Nancy (French pronunciation: [ekɔl nasjɔnal sypeʁjœʁ de min də nɑ̃si]; literally "National Higher School of Mines of Nancy"), also known as Mines Nancy or, formerly, École des mines de Nancy, is a French engineering grande école founded in 1919. It is an internal school of the University of Lorraine and a strategic partner of the Institut Mines-Télécom (IMT).

The school offers three engineer programs: one generalist program and two specialized programs. It also offers an international engineering program taught in English, several master's degrees, three mastères specialisés and continuing education courses. Its main areas of expertise are: energy, computer science, geosciences and civil engineering, industrial engineering and applied mathematics, and materials science and engineering.

It is located on the Artem campus in Nancy, in the Grand Est region. Around 400 students are taught general science and management and 300 follow specialised Master programs. These students are taught by 60 permanent professors. There are also 400 researchers including a hundred PhD students.

It was created on the request of the University of Nancy in order to contribute to the reconstruction of the mining and steel industry in the east of France after World War I.

== The Ingénieur civil des Mines degree ==
=== Description ===
The school was initially aimed at training mining engineers. In 1957, its director Bertrand Schwartz began its transformation into a modern "generalist" school. The school focuses on training innovative managers for the industry and researchers, with a broad generalist and high scientific knowledge, able to communicate in different languages. The Ingénieurs civils des Mines degree (Master of Science and Executive Engineering) is ranked among the best French Grande Ecole degrees. 20% of the students are international students, mainly from Morocco, Tunisia and China. In addition to the general science (advanced mathematics and physics) and management classes, the students have to specialise (one third of their classes) from their second year to the third (and last) year:

- "Département Matériaux" (materials and mechanics)
- "Département Énergie" (energetics and environment)
- "Département Génie Industriel" (applied mathematics and industrial engineering)
- "Département Information et Systèmes" (computer science)
- "Département Géoingénierie" (geosciences and civil engineering).

The students must learn English and at least another language.

=== Internships ===
The students have to do at least three internships in order to get the degree.

- Operator internship (6 weeks), whose aim is to discover the reality of work, become aware of the repetitive nature or physical difficulties of the tasks and understand human relations within a company.
- Assistant-engineer internship (at least 10 weeks).
- Engineer internship (at least 20 weeks, usually around 6 months), the end-of-course thesis has to be research oriented.

The engineer internship is usually an opportunity for the companies to hire the students.

=== Admission ===
For students having studied in the Classe Préparatoire aux Grandes Ecoles (a two-year highly selective undergraduate program in Mathematics, Physics), admission to the Ingénieur Civil des Mines degree is decided through a nationwide competitive examination (Concours Commun Mines-Ponts) and their origin can vary: MP, PC, PSI..., with a number of places for each.

It is also possible for student to be accepted for specialised master's or an exchange programs, in particular through partnerships with other schools or universities around the world.

== The Ingénieur degree in Industrial Engineering and Materials ==
=== Description ===
The Industrial Engineering and Materials Grande Ecole program [Ingénieur spécialité Génie Industriel et Matériaux] was established in 1991 under the joint initiative of Ecole des Mines de Nancy and its three partner companies: Renault, Saint-Gobain PAM and ArcelorMittal. This three-year graduate program is designed to provide students with general science and high skills in two complementary fields:

- Materials Science and Engineering
- Industrial Engineering

At the end of this graduate program, students are granted the Ingénieur degree in Industrial Engineering and Materials (Master of Science in Engineering), a French Grande Ecole degree (Diplôme d'Ingénieur) validated by Commission des Titres d’Ingénieur (CTI). In 2018, 80% of graduates found a job before graduation and 100% were hired within 4 months after graduation. 19% of graduates work in the automotive, aviation, naval, and rail industries, 12% in consulting firms and some graduates continue their materials science research in research institutes.

=== Internships ===
- Technician internship in the first year (at least 19 weeks).
- Assistant engineer internship in the second year (5 months).
- Engineer internship in the final year (6 months).

=== Admission ===
This Grande Ecole graduate program admits the students from Classe Préparatoire aux Grandes Ecoles (PT, TSI, ATS, CPP) and the best students from French universities (bachelor's degree or 2-year technical degree). The first round of selection is primarily based on students' undergraduate transcripts. Students who pass the first round must take the IELTS test and pass an interview at Ecole des Mines de Nancy. The admission is competitive, with only about 25 students admitted each year. In addition, there are also about 3 students from international partner universities of Ecole des Mines de Nancy admitted to this program.

== The Ingénieur degree in Mechanical design ==
After ingénieur civil des Mines and ingénieur industrial engineering and matérials, this engineering Grande Ecole program was established in 2000. Students who accomplish this three-year engineering curriculum receive the Ingénieur degree in Mechanical design [Ingénieur Génie Mécanique parcours ingénierie de la conception], a French Grande Ecole degree (Diplôme d'Ingénieur) validated by Commission des Titres d’Ingénieur (CTI).

== Research ==
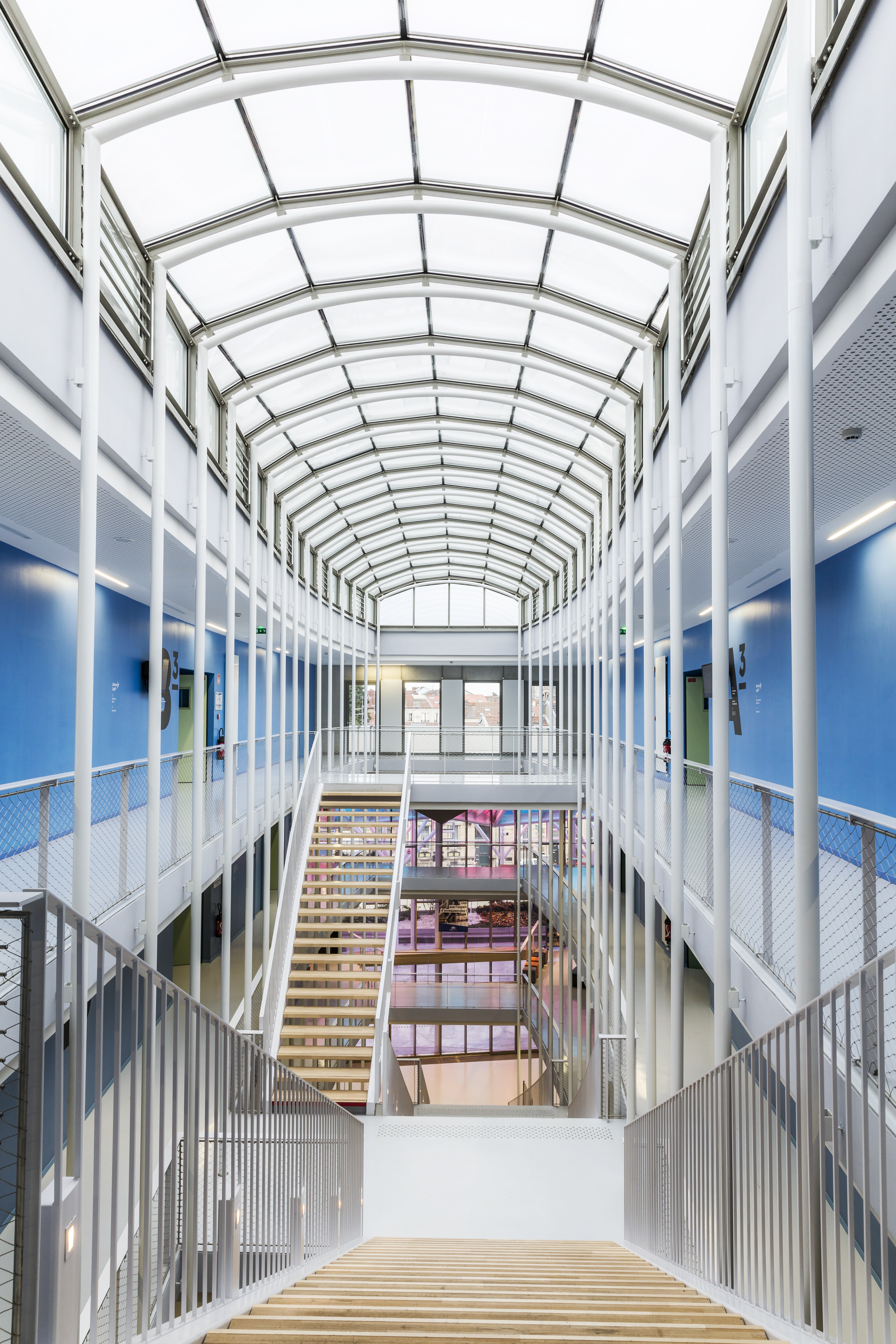
Main staircase in the hall of Ecole des Mines de Nancy

- LSG2M: science and engineering of materials and metallurgy
- LSGS: science and engineering of surfaces
- LPM: physics of materials
- GeoRessources: Geological resources and hazards
- CRPG: petrography and geochemistry
- LORIA: computer science and its applications
- ERPI: innovative Processes

== Forum Est-Horizon ==
The students of the ENSMN organize their own meeting with professionals, who present their companies and their activities. The FORUM EST-HORIZON is the biggest meeting between the professional world and the students in the East of France. With 50 exhibitors covering a large variety of economic and industrial fields, the forum gathered last year over 1000 students, looking for advice, information and internships.

== Notable alumni ==
- Jean-Claude Trichet, president of the European Central Bank from 2003 to 2011
- Jacques Bouriez, chief executive officer of Louis Delhaize Group
- Patrick Cousot, professor at New York University
- Louis Doucet, chief executive officer of GE Money Bank
- Bertrand Meheut, chief executive officer of Canal+ Group
- Amina Benkhadra, former Moroccan minister of energy, mines, water and environment since 2007.
- Kofi Yamgnane, mayor of Saint-Coulitz (Brittany), mayor of Saint-Briac (Brittany), French junior minister of social integration in 1991-1993 and deputy of Finistère in the French Parlement in 1997-2002. He ran for the 2010 Togolese presidential election.
- Xavier Mosquet, Senior Partner Emeritus and Senior Advisor at the Boston Consulting Group, founder of the Detroit office.
- Philippe Guillemot, chief executive officer of AREVA T&D
- Émilie Delorme, director of the Conservatoire National Supérieur de Musique et de Danse de Paris
- Philippe Baptiste, French minister in charge of Higher Education and Research

== The board of directors ==
among its members:

- Anne Lauvergeon, chief executive officer of AREVA
- Claude Imauven, chief executive officer of Saint-Gobain PAM, chief executive officer of Saint-Gobain
- Jean-Yves Koch, managing director of Capgemini

== See also ==
- Colorado School of Mines
- École nationale supérieure des Mines d'Albi Carmaux (Mines Albi-Carmaux)
- École nationale supérieure des Mines d'Alès (Mines Alès)
- École nationale supérieure des Mines de Douai (Mines Douai)
- École nationale supérieure des Mines de Nantes (Mines Nantes)
- École nationale supérieure des Mines de Paris (MINES ParisTech)
- École nationale supérieure des Mines de Saint-Étienne (Mines Saint-Étienne)
- École Nationale Supérieure des Mines de Rabat (Mines Rabat)
