= École nationale supérieure des télécommunications de Bretagne =

University in France

Coordinates: 48°21′33″N 4°34′12″W

Télécom Bretagne
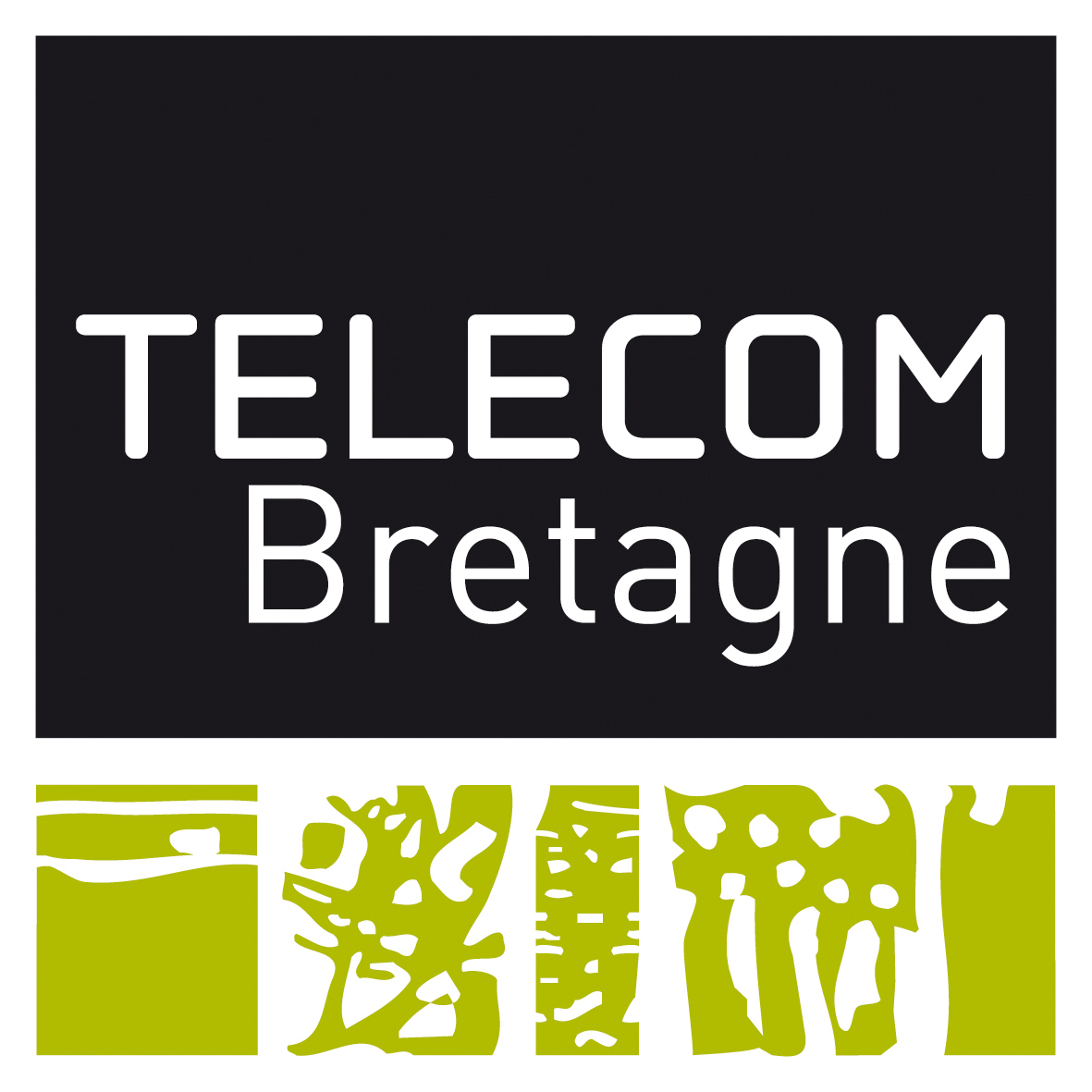
- Type: French Grande École
- Active: 1977–2017
- President: Paul Friedel
- Administrative staff: 300 (2009)
- Students: 1,219 (2009)
- Undergraduates: 998 (2009)
- Postgraduates: 430 (2009)
- Doctoral students: 221 (2009)
- Location: Brest, France
- Campus: Brest, Rennes
- Website: official

The Réseau Télécom

École nationale supérieure des télécommunications de Bretagne (ENSTB; French pronunciation: [ekɔl nɑsjɔnal sypeʁjœʁ de telekɔmynikasjɔ̃ də bʁətaɲ]; transl. "Brittany National School of Telecommunications") was a French grande école of engineering, and a research center providing training in information technologies and telecommunications. In 2017, it merged with École des mines de Nantes to form IMT Atlantique, which has consistently been ranked high in French and international rankings, e.g. 98 for Computer Science and 151-200th for Electrical Engineering in the 2023 QS Ranking.

As a member of the Institut Mines-Télécom, it had three campuses:

- Plouzané, in the Technopôle Brest-Iroise, near Brest (France);
- Campus de Beaulieu, in Rennes (France);
- SUPAERO campus, in Toulouse (France).

Télécom Bretagne had been the source of breakthroughs in the world of telecommunications, notably the turbo codes (first published in Proc. IEEE ICC'93) used extensively in 3G, 4G mobile telephony standards and other wireless systems including space communications.

== History ==
- 1974: Pierre Lelong – Secretary of State for the PTT (literally Postal Telegraph and Telephone) – decides to establish a second school of telecommunications that will be located in the Brest area.
- 1977: Creation of ENST Bretagne in Brest. Admission of the first student body which counted 31 students.
- 1986: Creation of the Rennes site.
- 1997: Creation of the Groupe des Écoles des Télécommunications (GET).
- 2008: Renamed Télécom Bretagne.
- 2012: Creation of the Institut Mines-Télécom.
- 2017: Merger with École des Mines de Nantes to form IMT Atlantique.

=== Master of engineering ===
For students admitted in formation initiale (FI, literally initial formation), the curriculum takes three years and deals with six main domains in 1st and 2nd year:

- Mathematics and signal processing
- Electronics and physics
- Computer science
- Networks
- Economy and social sciences
- Languages and intercultural dimensions

and four options in 3rd year:

- Engineering and system integration
- Software systems and networks
- Services and business engineering

=== Master of Sciences ===
Télécom Bretagne delivers Master of Science degrees, which are fully compliant with the Bologna system. MSc is a two-year training course leading to a high level of expertise in Information Technologies (IT):

- MSc in Telecommunication Systems Engineering
- MSc in Design and Engineering of Communication Networks
- MSc in Computer Science & Decision Systems
- MSc in Information Systems Project Management & Consulting

== Admission ==
Admission for the Engineering degree is decided, for most French students, through competitive examination after two to three years of mostly theoretical physics and mathematics classes in CPGE. Foreign students and a few French students are selected after undergraduate or graduate studies based on their results and specific tests.

== Notable alumni ==
- Pierre Gattaz, CEO of Radiall, president of MEDEF
- Jean-Marc Jézéquel, computer scientist and author, director of IRISA
- Imad Sabouni, Minister of Communications and Technology of Syria

== Notable faculty ==
- Adrienne Jablanczy, president of the Institut supérieur européen de gestion group

== See also ==
- Institut Mines-Télécom
- Télécom ParisTech
- Télécom & Management SudParis
