= Languedoc-Roussillon Universities =

Languedoc-Roussillon Universities (Languedoc-Roussillon Universités) is the association of universities and higher education institutions (ComUE) for institutions of higher education and research in the French regions of Languedoc-Roussillon.

The association was created as a ComUE according to the 2013 Law on Higher Education and Research (France), effective December 29, 2014. It replaced the pôle de recherche et d'enseignement supérieur (PRES) Université Montpellier Sud de France. Its creation also coincided with the merger of Montepellier Universities I and II to form University of Montpellier.

== Members ==
Languedoc-Roussillon Universities brings together the following institutions:

- University of Montpellier;
- Paul Valéry University, Montpellier III;
- University of Perpignan;
- University of Nîmes;
- École nationale supérieure de chimie de Montpellier;
- Institut de recherche pour le développement;
- Centre national de la recherche scientifique.
