= École nationale supérieure des mines de Saint-Étienne =

Engineering school in Saint-Étienne, France

Coordinates: 45°25′40″N 4°24′14″E

Saint-Étienne School of Mines
- École nationale supérieure des mines de Saint-Étienne
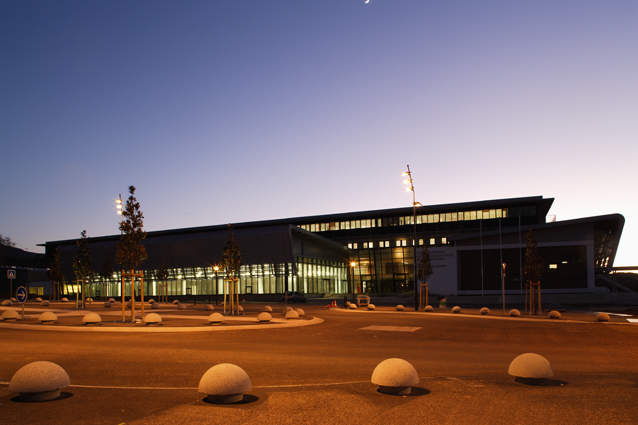
- Motto: Inspiring innovation
- Type: Grande école (public research university Engineering school)
- Established: 1816; 210 years ago
- Parent institution: Institut Mines-Télécom
- Academic affiliations: CDEFI, CGE
- Postgraduates: 2,500
- Doctoral students: 200
- Location: Saint-Étienne, Auvergne-Rhône-Alpes, France
- Campus: Urban
- Website: www.mines-stetienne.fr

École nationale supérieure des mines de Saint-Étienne (French pronunciation: [ekɔl nɑsjɔnal sypeʁjœʁ de min də sɛ̃t‿etjɛn]), also called École des Mines de Saint-Étienne (literally meaning "Saint-Étienne School of Mines") or simply Mines Saint-Étienne and commonly abbreviated EMSE is a French graduate engineering school (grandes écoles) training engineers and carrying out industry-oriented research. Mines Saint-Étienne is part of the Institut Mines-Télécom.

Its function is to support the development of its students and of companies through a range of courses and fields of research, from the initial training of generalist engineers ingénieurs civils des mines, to PhD teaching; from material sciences to micro-electronics via process engineering, mechanics, the environment, civil engineering, finance, computer science and health engineering.

== History ==
The school was founded in 1816 by a decision of Louis XVIII (2 August 1816).

== Admission for French students ==
For French nationals, admission to Civil Engineer of Mines is decided after competitive examination at the end of preparatory classes, a highly selective system.

== Notable alumni ==
- Benoît Fourneyron, designed the first practical water turbine in 1827
- Henri Fayol, a French management theorist
- Jules Garnier
- Mahamadou Issoufou, elected Niger President in March 2011
- Anne-Marcelle Kahn, (née Schrameck) first woman to graduate from the school, in 1919.
- Tadeusz Nowicki

== The puRkwa Prize ==
The puRkwa Prize is an "international prize for the scientific literacy of the children of the planet" awarded annually by the école nationale supérieure des mines of Saint Etienne and the French Academy of Sciences. The prize is awarded to pioneers in the innovation of general science education in school curricula for children less than 16 years of age. It was launched in 2004 at the initiative of Robert Germinet, the director of the école nationale supérieure des mines of Saint Etienne, and comes with an €80,000 monetary award.

Year	Recipient	Institution(s)	Nationality	Cited work	References
2005	Maricio Duque	University of the Andes	Colombia	Pequeños Científicos	
2005	Michael Klentchy	El Centro School District	United States	Valle Imperial Project in Science	
2006	Yu Wei	Southeast University	People's Republic of China	Zuo zhong xue	
2006	Karen Worth	Education Development Center; Wheelock College	United States	K-12 Science Curriculum Dissemination Center	
2007	Jorge Allende	University of Santiago, Chile	Chile	Educación en Ciencias Basada en la Indagación	
2007	Stevan Jokic	Vinča Institute of Nuclear Sciences	Serbia and Montenegro	Ruka u testu	
2008	Guillermo Fernández de la Garza	National Autonomous University of Mexico; United States – Mexico Foundation for Science	Mexico	Sistema de Enseñanza Vivencial e Indagatoria de la Ciencia	
2008	Wynne Harlen	University of Bristol	United Kingdom	Research in science education	
2009	Sally Goetz Shuler	National Science Resources Center	United States	Institutional award	
2009	David Jasmin	La main à la pâte	France	Institutional award	

== Other schools of mines ==
=== France ===
- École nationale supérieure des Mines d'Albi Carmaux (Mines Albi-Carmaux)
- École nationale supérieure des Mines d'Alès (Mines Alès)
- École nationale supérieure des Mines de Douai (Mines Douai)
- École nationale supérieure des Mines de Nancy
- École nationale supérieure des Mines de Nantes (Mines Nantes)
- École nationale supérieure des Mines de Paris (Mines ParisTech)

=== Africa ===
- École nationale supérieure des Mines de Rabat (Mines Rabat)

=== United States ===
- Colorado School of Mines

== See also ==
- Official website
- SPIN Center of Chemical Engineering
- Saint Etienne Mines alumni union
- Mines alumni union (all french Schools of Mines)
