= École Nationale Supérieure des Mines de Rabat =

Engineering school in Morocco

Coordinates: 34°00′01″N 6°51′18″W

Rabat School of Mines
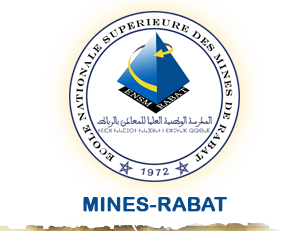
- Former names: Ecole des Mines (1972–1994); Ecole Nationale de l'Industrie Minérale (1994–2014)
- Motto: Practice and Innovation
- Type: Grande école
- Established: 1972
- Affiliations: Conférence des Grandes écoles
- Location: Rabat, Morocco
- Website: www.enim.ac.ma

The École Nationale Supérieure des Mines de Rabat (ENSMR), also called Mines Rabat in French or Rabat School of Mines in English, is a leading Grande école engineering school in Morocco. The institution was originally established as the École des Mines (1972–1994). It was then known as the École Nationale de l'Industrie Minérale (ENIM; National School of the Mineral Industry) from 1994 to 2014, before adopting its current name, École Nationale Supérieure des Mines de Rabat, in 2014.

Based in Rabat, Mines Rabat is one of the oldest engineering schools in Morocco. Mines Rabat is a member of the Conférence des grandes écoles (CGE). The course for the engineering program lasts three years and the admission is done mainly by the common national competition (CNC) after making two or three years of preparatory classes.

Grandes Écoles are institutions of higher education that are separate from, but parallel and connected to the main framework of the Moroccan-French public university system. Similar to the Ivy League in the United States, Oxbridge in the UK, and C9 League in China, Grandes Écoles are elite academic institutions that admit students through an extremely competitive process. Mines Rabat's Alumni go on to occupy elite positions within government, administration, and corporate firms in Morocco.

Despite its small size (fewer than 300 students are accepted each year, after a very selective exam), it is a crucial part of the infrastructure of the Moroccan industry. Based in Rabat, it is one of the oldest engineering schools in Morocco. Mines Rabat is a member of the Conférence des grandes écoles (CGE). The course for the engineering program lasts three years and the admission is done mainly by the common national competition (CNC) after making two or three years of preparatory classes.

In the limit of available places candidates can be admitted to the Engineering Cycle by level:

- Associate
- Bachelor
- University's Master

The engineering cycle is 3 years for applicants holding an associate's or a bachelor's degree and is 2 years for applicants holding a, master's degree.

The Ph.D. and Deng cycles are 3 to 5 years for applicants holding an engineering degree or a master's degree.

The school has similarities with the Mines ParisTech, Mines Saint-Étienne, Mines Nancy in France, Columbia School of Mines, Colorado School of Mines, South Dakota School of Mines and Technology in the USA, and Royal School of Mines, Camborne School of Mines in the UK.

== Admissions ==
Admission to Mines Rabat in the normal cycle is made through a very selective entrance examination and requires at least two years of preparation after high school in preparatory classes. Admission includes a week of written examinations during the spring followed sometimes by oral examinations over the summer.

== History ==
The school was established in 1972 and now about 300 Moroccan students are admitted each year. Foreign students, having followed a class préparatoire curriculum (generally, African students) can also enter through the same competitive exam. Finally, some foreign students come for a single year from other top institutions in Africa.

== Notable alumni ==
Mines Rabat graduates occupy prominent positions in Morocco's mining industry, government sector, and leading corporations. The school's alumni network includes leaders in major Moroccan companies such as the OCP Group and Managem (Morocco's largest private mining operator).

=== Government Officials ===
- Abdelkader Amara - Former Minister of Energy, Mines, Water and Environment (2013-2016) and Minister of Industry, Trade and New Technologies (2012-2013). He was instrumental in supporting the legislative project that transformed ENIM into École Nationale Supérieure des Mines de Rabat in 2014. Currently serves as President of Morocco's Economic, Social and Environmental Council (CESE).
- Mohammed Boutaleb - Engineer geologist and Doctor of State in geochemistry. He served as professor at École Nationale de l'Industrie Minérale de Rabat (ENIM) and was appointed Minister of Energy and Mines in 2002.
- Abdelhanine Benallou - Former professor at École Nationale de l'Industrie Minérale de Rabat (ENIM) and former Director General of the Office National des Aéroports (ONDA). He graduated from Institut Polytechnique de Toulouse and held a Ph.D. from University of California. He also served as head of Morocco's Renewable Energy Center (CDER) in the late 1990s.

=== Industry Sectors ===
Mines Rabat alumni hold leadership positions in:

- Mining and Energy Sector: Executive positions in Morocco's mining and energy sectors, including senior roles at OCP Group (world's largest phosphate producer) and Managem.
- Government Officials: Key positions within Morocco's Ministry of Energy, Mines and Environment.
- Academic Researchers: Contributions to research institutions and universities both in Morocco and internationally.
- International Corporations: Roles in multinational engineering and consulting firms.

== Rankings ==
Mines Rabat is ranked among the top 5 Moroccan Grandes Ecoles, though it doesn't appear in international rankings due to its very limited number of students (900 students per year for the class of 2022).

== Preparatory classes: The classic admission path into Grandes Écoles ==
To enter the Diplôme d'Ingénieur curriculum of Grandes Écoles, students traditionally have to complete the first two years of their curriculum in the very intensive preparatory classes, most often in an institution outside the Grande École.

- University students pursuing an Associate of Science can take the university admission path examination: Admitted students admitted with associates from universities need to pursue a 3 years cycle of engineering at the school to get the "Diplôme d'Ingénieur"
- University graduates with one of the following degrees can also apply to get admitted to the engineering cycle of the school.

== The Diplôme d'Ingénieur (Combined Bachelor's/Master's degree in Engineering) ==
Grandes Écoles of Engineering usually offers several master's degree programs, the most important of which is the Diplôme d'Ingénieur (Engineer's Degree equivalent to a combined BS/MS in Engineering).

Because of the strong selection of the students and of the very high quality of the curriculum, the Diplôme d'Ingénieur (combined BS/MS degree in Engineering)) gives the right to bear the title of an Ingénieur, is one of the most prestigious degrees in Morocco. The degree is protected by law and submitted to strict government supervision. It is more valued by companies than a university degree in terms of career opportunities and wages. At the end of these preparatory classes, the students take nationwide, extremely selective competitive exams for entrance into Grandes Écoles, where they complete their curriculum for three years.

- 1st year at Mines Rabat - equivalent to - senior year of BSc.
- 2nd year at Mines Rabat - equivalent to - 1st year of MSc.
- 3rd (final) year at Mines Rabat - equivalent to - 2nd year of MSc.

== Options and majors ==
The Mines Rabat has a total of 15 engineering options:

- Energy Engineering
- Environment and Industrial Safety
- Computer Engineering
- Production Systems
- Electromechanical
- Industrial Maintenance
- Mechanical Engineering and Development
- Industrial Engineering
- Process Engineering
- Materials and Quality Control
- Mining and Civil Engineering
- Renewable energy

== Doctoral program (PhD) ==
The school also has a doctoral program open to students with a master's degree or equivalent. Doctoral students generally work in the laboratories of the school; they may also work in external institutes or establishments. The PhD program takes three to five years to complete.

== Research and Innovation ==
Mines Rabat maintains several research laboratories and centers focused on industrial and technological innovation. The school's research activities are organized into specialized laboratories and research teams covering key areas aligned with Morocco's industrial and economic development priorities:

=== Major Research Laboratories ===
- Laboratory of Systems Engineering and Digital Transformation (Laboratoire Ingénierie des Systèmes et Transformation Digitale - LISTD): Focuses on systems engineering and digital transformation technologies, supporting Industry 4.0 initiatives and smart manufacturing solutions.
- Laboratory of Applied Mathematics and Decisional Informatics (Laboratoire de Mathématiques Appliquées et d'Informatique Décisionnelle - LMAID): Specializes in applied mathematics, computational intelligence, and decision support systems for industrial applications.
- Laboratory of Mechanics, Materials and Thermal (Laboratoire Mécanique, Matériaux et Thermique - LMMT): Conducts research in mechanical engineering, advanced materials science, and thermal engineering applications.
- Laboratory of Control, Steering and Monitoring in Electrical Energy (Laboratoire Commande, Pilotage et Surveillance en Energie Electriques - CPS2E): Focuses on electrical energy systems, control theory, and monitoring technologies for power systems.

=== Specialized Research Teams ===
==== Energy and Process Engineering ====
- SMAEP Team – Simulation, Modeling and Energy Analysis of Processes: Develops simulation tools and models for energy analysis and optimization of industrial processes.
- SEPTh Team – Energy Systems and Thermal Processes: Researches energy systems and thermal processes with applications in renewable energy and process engineering.
- EEP Team – Energy and Clean Processes: Focuses on clean energy technologies and environmentally friendly industrial processes.

==== Management and Risk Analysis ====
- MRP Team – Risk Management and Performance: Specializes in risk assessment methodologies and performance optimization in industrial settings.

==== Mining and Geological Engineering ====
- GGM Team – Geological, Civil and Mining Engineering: Conducts research in geological engineering, civil engineering applications, and mining technologies.

==== Environmental and Resource Management ====
- VRES Team – Resource Valorization, Environment and Safety: Focuses on sustainable resource management, environmental protection, and industrial safety protocols.

=== Research Focus Areas ===
The school's research activities are concentrated in key areas aligned with Morocco's industrial and economic development priorities:

- Mining and Geological Engineering: Research in mineral extraction, geological exploration, and sustainable mining practices.
- Energy and Renewable Resources: Studies in renewable energy systems, energy efficiency, and sustainable development.
- Materials Science and Engineering: Advanced materials research, quality control, and industrial applications.
- Industrial Engineering and Process Optimization: Research in production systems, industrial maintenance, and process engineering.
- Environmental Engineering and Industrial Safety: Studies in environmental protection, industrial safety protocols, and sustainable development.
- Digital Transformation and Systems Engineering: Industry 4.0 technologies, smart manufacturing, and digital innovation.

The school collaborates closely with industrial partners, particularly in Morocco's mining and energy sectors, providing students with research opportunities and industry connections.

== International ==
Agreements signed with:

- France:
  - École polytechnique
  - ENSTA Paris
  - Arts et Métiers ParisTech
  - École Spéciale des Travaux Publics
  - École nationale des travaux publics de l'État
  - Central Group of Schools (CentraleSupélec, École Centrale de Lyon, École Centrale de Nantes, École Centrale de Lille, Centrale Méditerranée)
  - Groupe des écoles des mines (Mines ParisTech, École Nationale Supérieure des Mines de Saint-Étienne, École Nationale Supérieure des Mines de Nancy, IMT Atlantique, École des mines d'Albi-Carmaux, École des mines d'Alès)
  - Supmicrotech
  - École européenne d'ingénieurs en génie des matériaux
  - École Nationale Supérieure de Géologie
  - Institut National des Sciences Appliquées de Lyon
  - Institut national des sciences appliquées de Rouen
  - INSA Hauts-de-France
  - University of Lorraine
- Canada:
  - Ecole Polytechnique de Montreal
  - Laval University
- United States:
  - Colorado School of Mines

== See also ==
- Schools of mines, for a list of schools of mines internationally
