= Grande école =

French institutions of higher education

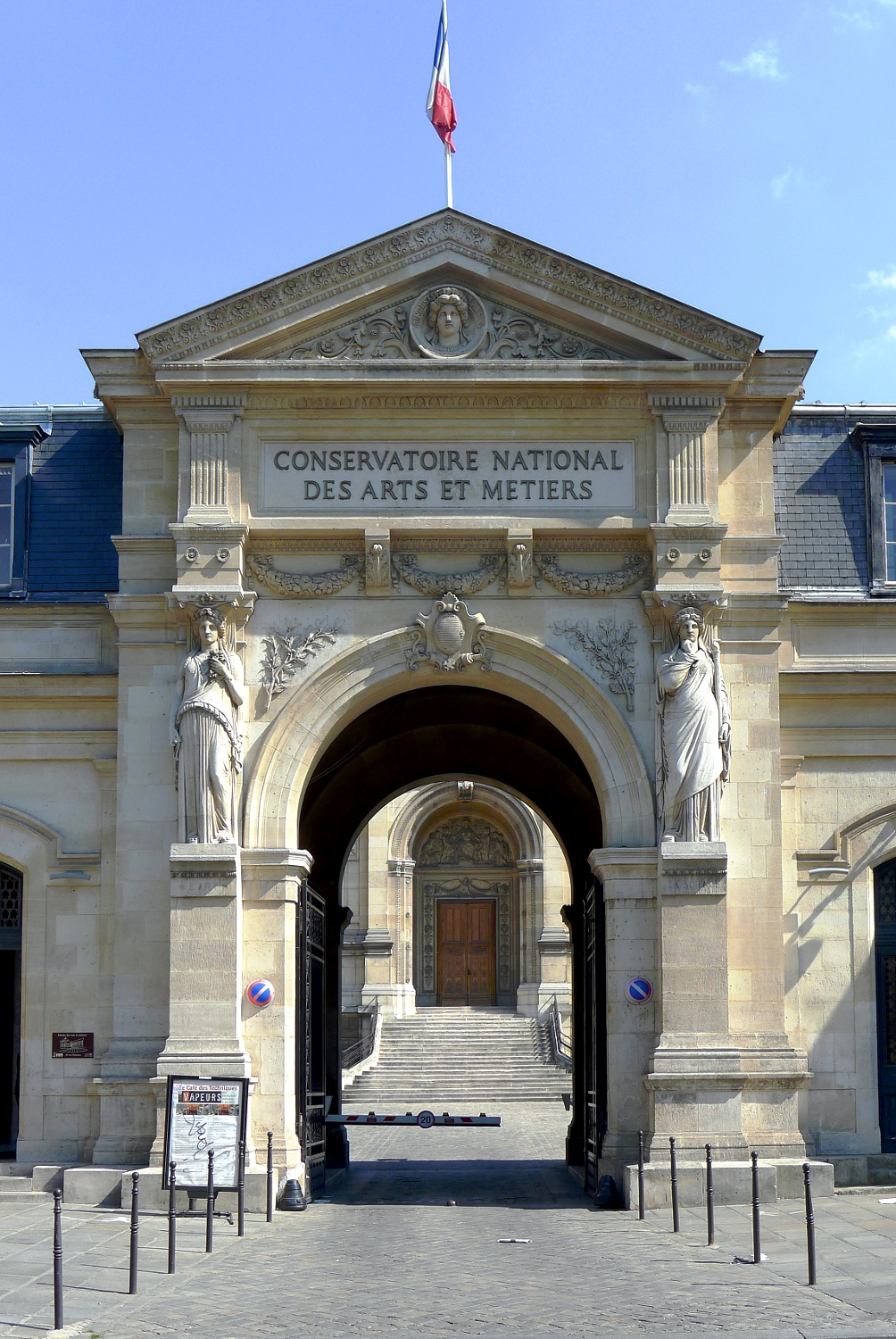
Gate of the Conservatoire national des arts et métiers, in the 3rd arrondissement of Paris

A grande école (French: [ɡʁɑ̃d ekɔl]; lit. 'great school', pl. grandes écoles) is a specialized top-level educational institution in France and some other countries such as Algeria and Morocco. Grandes écoles are part of an alternative educational system that operates alongside the mainstream French public university system, and are dedicated to teaching, research and professional training in either pure natural and social sciences, or applied sciences such as engineering, architecture, business administration, or public policy and administration.

Similar to the Ivy League in the United States, Oxbridge in the UK, the Designated National Universities in Japan and the C9 League in China, Grandes écoles are elite academic institutions that admit students through an extremely competitive process. Grandes écoles primarily admit students based on their national ranking in written and oral exams called concours, which are organized annually by the French Ministry of Education. While anyone can register for concours, successful candidates have almost always completed two or three years of dedicated preparatory classes (classes préparatoires) prior to admission.

As they are separate from universities, most of them do not deliver the undergraduate degree of the Licence (the university bachelor's degree in France) or the university master's degree, but deliver:

- the Accredited Diploma awarding a grade de master (for example, delivered with a Programme Grande École or for Master in Management in business schools) or grade de licence;
- the Engineer's Diploma (Diplôme d'Ingénieur) awarding a grade de master;

Admission to the grandes écoles is extremely selective. Grandes écoles are generally publicly funded and therefore have limited tuition costs. Some, especially business schools (Écoles de commerce) and specialized schools, are organised privately and therefore have more costly tuition.

== Classification of grandes écoles ==
=== Origins ===
The term grande école originated in 1794 after the French Revolution, when the National Convention created the École normale supérieure, the mathematicians Gaspard Monge and Lazare Carnot created the École centrale des travaux publics (later the École polytechnique), and the abbot Henri Grégoire created the Conservatoire national des arts et métiers.

==== École du génie militaire de Mézières ====
The model was probably the military academy at Mézières, of which Monge was an alumnus. The selective admission opens up to higher education based on academic merit.

Some schools included in the category have roots in the 17th and 18th centuries and are older than the term grande école, which dates to 1794. Their forerunners were schools aimed at graduating civil servants, such as technical officers (École d'Arts et Métiers, renamed Arts et Métiers ParisTech, established in 1780), mine supervisors (École des mines de Paris, established in 1783), bridge and road engineers (École royale des ponts et chaussées, established in 1747), and shipbuilding engineers (École des ingénieurs-constructeurs des vaisseaux royaux, established in 1741).

Five military engineering academies and graduate schools of artillery were established in the 17th century in France, such as the école de l'artillerie de Douai (established in 1697) and the later école du génie de Mézières (established in 1748), wherein mathematics, chemistry and sciences were already a major part of the curriculum taught by first-rank scientists such as Pierre-Simon Laplace, Charles Étienne Louis Camus, Étienne Bézout, Sylvestre-François Lacroix, Siméon Denis Poisson, Gaspard Monge (most of whom were later to form the teaching corps of École Polytechnique during the Napoleonic era).

In 1802, Napoleon created the École spéciale militaire de Saint-Cyr, which is also considered a grande école, although it trains only army officers.

During the 19th century, a number of higher-education grandes écoles were established to support industry and commerce, such as École nationale supérieure des Mines de Saint-Étienne in 1816, École Supérieure de Commerce de Paris (today ESCP Business School, founded in 1819), L'institut des sciences et industries du vivant et de l'environnement (Agro ParisTech) in 1826, and École centrale des Arts et Manufactures (École centrale Paris) in 1829.

Between 1832 and 1870, the Central School of Arts and Manufactures produced 3,000 engineers and served as a model for most of the industrialized countries. Until 1864, a quarter of its students came from abroad. Conversely, the quality of French technicians astonished southeastern Europe, Italy, the Near East, and even Belgium. The system of grandes écoles expanded, enriched by the Ecole des Eaux et Forêts at Nancy in 1826, the Ecole des Arts industriels at Lille in 1854, the Ecole centrale lyonnaise in 1857, and the National Institute of Agronomy, reconstituted in 1876 after a fruitless attempt between 1848 and 1855. Finally, the training of the lower grades of staff, who might today be called 'production engineers', was assured to an even greater extent by the development of Ecoles d'Arts et métiers, of which the first was established at Châlons-sur-Marne in 1806 and the second at Angers in 1811 (both reorganized in 1832), with a third at Aix-en-Provence in 1841. Each had room for 300 pupils. There is no doubt that in the 1860s France had the best system of higher technical and scientific education in Europe.

— Mathias, Peter; Postan, Michael (1978). The Cambridge Economic History of Europe. Cambridge University Press. p. 313. ISBN 9780521215909.

During the latter part of the 19th century and in the 20th century, more grandes écoles were established for education in businesses as well as newer fields of science and technology, including Rouen Business School (NEOMA Business School) in 1871, Sciences Po Paris in 1872, École nationale supérieure des télécommunications in 1878, Hautes Études commerciales in 1881, École supérieure d'électricité in 1894, Ecole des hautes Etudes commerciales du Nord in 1906, Ecole Supérieure des Sciences économiques et commerciales in 1907, and Institut Supérieur de l'Aéronautique et de l'Espace (SUPAERO) in 1909.

Since then, France has had a unique dual higher education system, with small and middle-sized specialized graduate schools operating alongside the traditional university system. Some fields of study are nearly exclusive to one part of this dual system, such as medicine in universités only, or architecture in écoles only.

The grande école (and "prépa") system also exists in former French colonies, Switzerland, and Italy (Napoleon, as king of Italy for ten years, established the French system there). The influence of this system was strong in the 19th century throughout the world, as can be seen in the original names of many world universities (Caltech was originally "Polytechnic Institute", as was ETH Zürich—"the Polytechnicum"—in addition to the Polytechnique in Montréal. Some institutions in China, Russia, the UK, and the US also have names of some French grandes écoles, adapted to their languages). The success of the German and Anglo-Saxon university models from the late 19th century reduced the influence of the French system in some of the English-speaking world.

=== Today ===
There is no standard definition or official list of grandes écoles. The term grande école is not employed in the French education code, with the exception of a quotation in the social statistics. It generally employs the expression of "écoles supérieures" to indicate higher educational institutions that are not universities.

The Conférence des grandes écoles (CGE) (Grandes Écoles Conference) is a non-profit organization. It uses a broad definition of grande école, which is not restricted to the school's selectivity or the prestige of the diploma awarded. The members of CGE have not made an official or "accepted" list of grandes écoles. For example, some engineering school members of the CGE cannot award state-recognized engineering degrees.

== Admission to grandes écoles ==
The admissions process for grandes écoles differs greatly from those of other French universities. To be admitted into most French grandes écoles, most students study in a two-year preparatory program in one of the CPGEs (see below) before taking a set of competitive national exams. Different exams are required by groups (called "banques") of different schools. The national exams are sets of written tests, given over the course of several weeks, that challenge the student on the intensive studies of the previous two years. During the summer, those students who succeed in the written exams then take a further set of exams, usually one-hour oral exams, during which they are given a problem to solve. After 20 minutes of preparation, the candidate presents the solution to a professor, who challenges the candidate on the answer and the assumptions being made. Afterwards, candidates receive a final national ranking, which determines admission to their grande école of choice.

=== Preparatory classes for grandes écoles (CPGE) ===
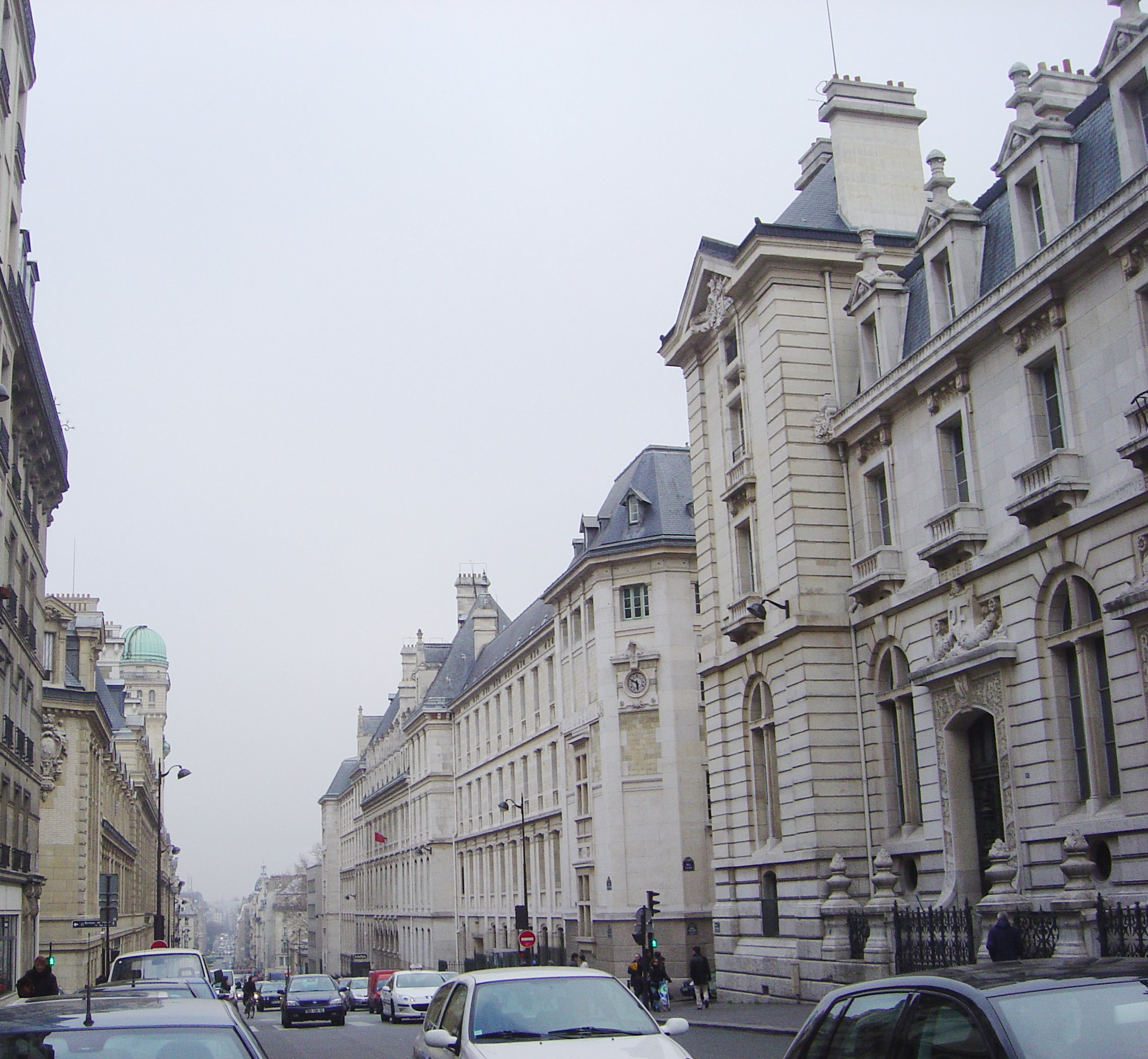
The Lycée Louis-le-Grand, in Paris, is one of the most famous lycées providing preparatory classes for grandes écoles. (It is on the right side of the rue Saint-Jacques; on the left is the Sorbonne.)

Classes préparatoires aux Grandes Écoles (CPGE), or prépas (preparatory classes for grandes écoles), are two-year classes, in either sciences, literature, or economics. These are the traditional way in which most students prepare to pass the competitive recruitment examination of the main grandes écoles. Most are held in state lycées (high schools); a few are private. Admission is competitive and based on the students' lycée grades. Preparatory classes with the highest success rates in the entrance examinations of the top grandes écoles are highly selective. Students who are not admitted to the grande école of their choice often repeat the second year of preparatory classes and attempt the exam again the following year.

There are five categories of prépas:

- Scientifiques: These prepare for the engineering schools and teach mathematics, physics, chemistry, and technology. They are broken down in sub-categories according to the emphasis of their dominant subject: they are mainly focused on mathematics and either physics (MP), industrial sciences and technologies (TSI), physics and chemistry (PC), physics and engineering science (PSI), physics and technology (PT) and chemistry, physics and technology (TPC) .

There is also the BCPST, which is focusend on biology, chemistry, physics, geology, and mathematics.

- Lettres: humanities, essentially for the Écoles normales supérieures (students can also compete to enter business schools, but represent a small minority of those admitted). There are two main sub-categories: "Lettres", in either "A/L" (with Ancient Greek and/or Latin) or LSH (with geography), and B/L (with mathematics and social sciences).
- Économique et commerciale: mathematics and economics. These prepare for the entrance exams to the French business schools, and are subdivided between science (mathematics) and economics tracks - a third track also exists for students with a "technological", i.e. applied background.
- Chartes: humanities, with an emphasis on philology, history and languages, named after the school École nationale des Chartes. By far the smallest prépa in number of students.

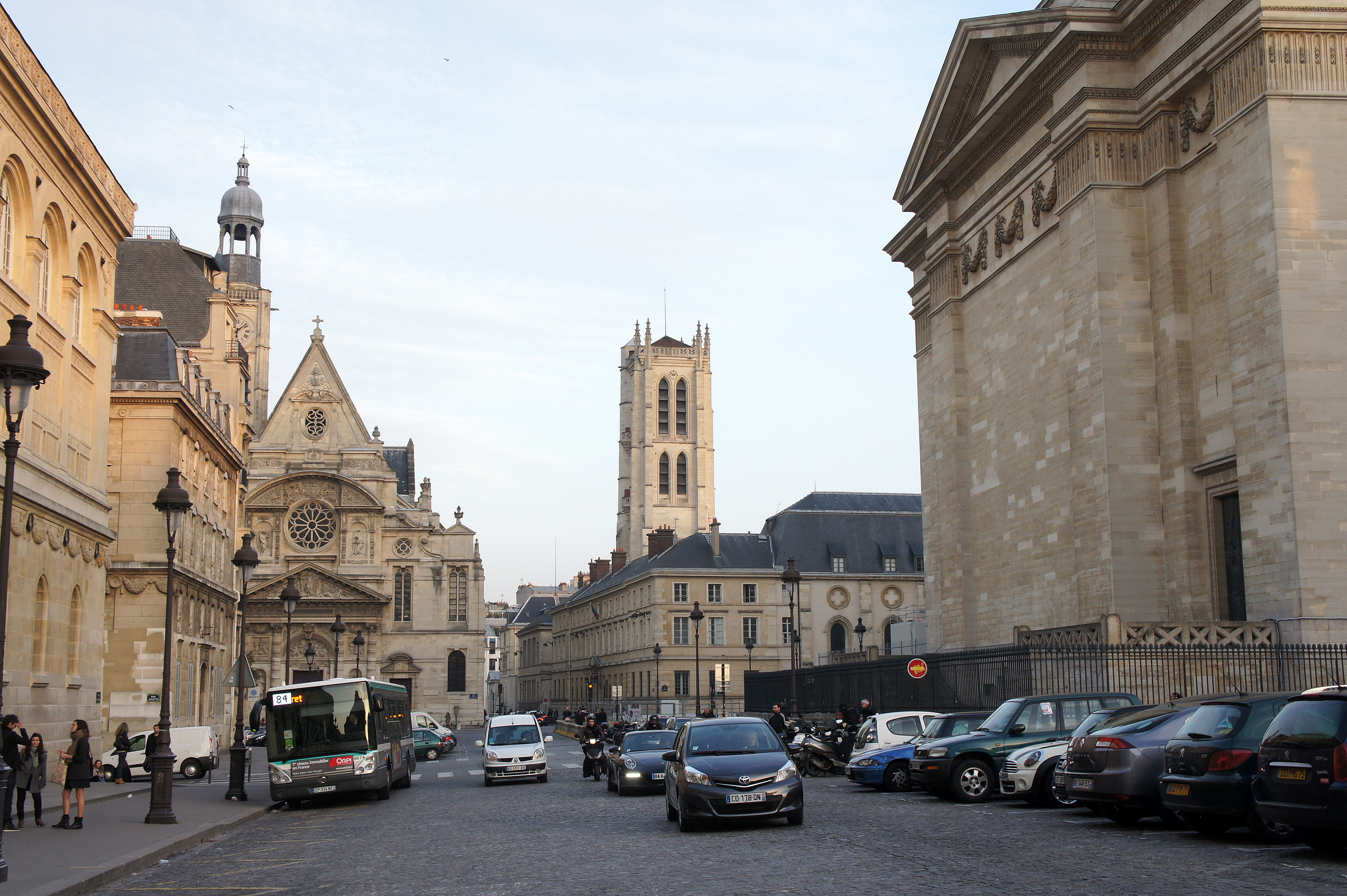
Just as famous for its classes prépas is the Lycée Henri-IV, facing the Panthéon.

=== Recruitment at baccalauréat level ===
Some schools are accessible after a selection based on the grades of the two last years of lycée (High school) and/or the baccalaureate (High school diploma) results. For example, in engineering, the most attractive and selective ones are the seven schools composing the Institut National des Sciences Appliquées (INSA network), but there are dozens of selective and less selective engineering schools accessible directly after the baccalaureate. Some other famous highly selective engineering school are the three Universités de Technologie. It is also possible to join these schools in third year after a preparatory class or university and then the recruitment is based on a contest or the student results.

Most of these five-year grandes écoles are public, with very low admission fees (between 601€ and 2,350€ per year), and are free for national scholarship holders. A few others are either private or public with very high admission fee (up to 10,000€ per year, without exoneration for scholarship holders). These are usually the least selective ones and offer five-year training to students who otherwise could not have enrolled in a five-year curriculum directly after High school.

The top three public engineering grandes écoles with standard admission fees (among 70), according to the French magazine L'Étudiant noir, are in 2023 the Institut National des Sciences Appliquées de Lyon (INSA Lyon), Institut National des Sciences Appliquées de Toulouse (INSA Toulouse) and École des Mines de Douai (IMT Nord Europe). However, the rankings may differ significantly between years, magazines, and the metric of interest (academic excellence, employability, diversity, ...).

Most of them simply include the two-year preparatory class in their program while others like INSA Toulouse chose the Bachelor's master's doctorate system (BMD or LMD in French) to start the specialization earlier. Most students choose to get their licence, master or doctorate close to home.

These years of preparation can be highly focused on the school program so students have a greater chance of succeeding in the admission exam or contest in their school if there is one, but they are not prepared to take the examinations for other schools so their chance of success in these other examinations is low.

The advantage is that instead of studying simply to pass the admission exams, the student will study topics more targeted to their training and future specialization. The main advantage is that students choose their speciality more according to their interests and less according to their rank. (Indeed, the rank obtained after standard preparatory classes determines a list of schools with their specialities).

On another note, the selection process during the first preparatory year is considered less stressful than in a standard first preparatory class, and the first year often offers broader scientific training since it does not specifically prepare students for competitions. Nevertheless, the selection percentage are often the same order as during standard preparatory classes. The top-ranking five year grandes écoles also recruit some of the best students who followed one or two years of CPGE, through parallel admission procedures.

=== Parallel admission ===
The prépa years are not required to sit the entrance exams. Moreover, in many schools, there is also the possibility of "parallel admission" to a grande école. Parallel admissions are open to university students or students from other schools that decide not to take the entrance exams. This method of recruitment is proving increasingly popular, with many students choosing to first go to a university and then enroll in a grande école.

Some grandes écoles have a dual diploma arrangement in which a student can switch establishments in the last year to receive diplomas from both establishments.

== Degrees awarded ==
=== Historically ===
The French Grandes écoles mostly do not fit into the international, Anglo-American framework regarding their diplomas, nor in the European Bologna system. In 2007, the OECD remarked in a report that "their diplomas do not fit easily into the increasingly standardised international nomenclature for academic study ... Instead, students effectively study for five years and are then awarded a masters degree, with no intermediate diploma".

However, some Grandes écoles have decided to adopt the standard, European Bologna system of diplomas recently in order to better integrate themselves in the international academic competition. In their 2008 book European Universities in Transition, Carmelo Mazza, Paolo Quattrone and Angelo Riccaboni underlined that "the vast majority of Grandes Ecoles do not give any degree" upon completion of undergraduate studies, but that "[i]n practice, for accreditation or student exchange purposes, they grant a certificate of 'equivalence to a bachelor's degree'".

Examples of Grande École diplomas (excluding engineering and business schools), which are neither bachelor's degrees nor university master's degrees, but which are accredited diplomas awarding a bachelor's and master's degree:

- École Normale Supérieure – PSL (public): Diplôme de l'École Normale Supérieure (DENS), awarding a grade de master (master's degree);
- Institutes of Political Studies (public): Diplôme d'IEP, awarding a grade de master (master's degree);
- École Pratique des Hautes Études (public): Diplôme de l'EPHE, awarding a grade de master (master's degree).

=== In engineering Grandes écoles ===
For their engineering programs, the Grandes écoles award an "Diplôme d'Ingénieur", similar to a Master of Engineering degree. This engineer's degree, required to use the engineer title in France, is strictly protected and can only be awarded by state-accredited Grandes écoles, via the Engineering Accreditation Commission (CTI).

=== In Grandes écoles business schools ===
In France, the majority of business schools are private or semi-private. For their programs, business schools that are Grandes écoles (like HEC or ESCP) offer a "Programme Grande École" or "PGE" (generally translated into English as "Master in Management", or "Grande École program"), which delivers a state-accredited diploma that is considerably more prestigious than a French master's degree in management delivered by university schools of management (IAE) or management faculties in the mainstream French university system.

In France, only public Grandes écoles and universities can award licences, masters and doctorates. For example, the semi-private ESCP Business School has signed a partnership agreement to award a PhD in management from Panthéon-Sorbonne University. The semi-private school HEC has done the same, along with the Polytechnic Institute of Paris (a public research university which consists of six public grandes écoles).

Example:

- ESCP Business School: Diplôme du Programme Grande École de ESCP, awarding a grade de master (master's degree).

== Faculty in Grandes écoles ==
=== Full-time researchers and teaching faculty ===
Full-time faculty researchers to assume their responsibility as teaching staff by giving lectures, accompanying students in their projects, participating in the campus life and representing the school during symposia.

Their contractual number of working hours is defined at the beginning of each academic year in a lump sum workload timetable.

Full-time faculty/teaching are in charge of giving lectures, but also shoulder pedagogic coordination. As such, they are deeply involved in their respective campus' life and accountable for the teaching quality as well as the pedagogic continuous improvement of the School.

Prominent professors: according to L'Etudiant, a prominent professor is permanent professor, holding a PhD from a French or foreign Higher Education Institution which is AACSB- or EQUIS-accredited and ranked amongst the Shanghai 2019 top 500 ranking.

=== Adjunct professors ===
Adjunct Professors hold chair in another Higher Education Institution. Their teaching conditions are various, but not always stipulated in a contractual form.

Visiting professors are teaching staff which hold a chair along another activity, e.g. a consultant or entrepreneur giving lectures once or twice a week.

Guest professors are international professors who take part in special lectures, classes or programme.

== Categories ==
Grandes écoles can be classified into following broad categories:

=== Écoles normales supérieures ===
These schools train researchers and professors and may be a beginning for executive careers in public administration or business. Many French Nobel Prize and Fields Medal laureates were educated at the École Normale Supérieure in Paris, Lyon or Paris-Saclay. There are four ENS:

- the École Normale Supérieure of PSL University, nicknamed "Ulm" from its address rue d'Ulm in Paris (sciences and humanities);
- the École Normale Supérieure de Lyon in Lyon (sciences and humanities);
- the École Normale Supérieure Paris-Saclay, near Paris (sciences, engineering, social sciences, economics and management, foreign languages), a constituent grande école of Paris-Saclay University.
- the École Normale Supérieure de Rennes near Rennes (sciences, engineering, social sciences, economics and management, sport), a constituent grande école of the University of Rennes.

Until recently, unlike most other grandes écoles, écoles normales supérieures (ENS) did not award specific diplomas. Students who completed their curriculum were entitled to be known as "ENS alumni" or "normaliens". The schools encourage their students to obtain university diplomas in partner institutions while providing extra classes and support. Many ENS students obtain more than one university diploma. Normaliens from France and other European Union countries are considered civil servants in training (unless they were recruited by parallel admission), and as such are paid a monthly salary in exchange for agreeing to serve France for ten years, including those years spent as students.

=== Engineering schools (grandes écoles d'ingénieurs) ===
Many engineering schools recruit most of their students who have completed their education in scientific preparatory classes (2 years of post-baccalaureat study). Many are also joint graduate schools from several regional universities, sometimes in association with other international higher education networks.

In France, the term 'engineer' has a broader meaning compared to the one understood in most other countries and can imply a person who has achieved a high level of study in both fundamental and applied sciences, as well as business management, humanities and social sciences. The best engineering schools will often provide such a general and very intensive education, although this is not always the case. Most of the schools of the following first four groups train the so-called 'generaliste' engineers:

1. ParisTech alliance (an alliance of prominent engineering schools in Paris). Some of these schools are now part of collegiate universities such as Paris-Saclay University, PSL University or the Polytechnic Institute of Paris. Also some of these schools teach only a specific area):

- In Paris-Saclay University:
  - Institut des sciences et industries du vivant et de l'environnement (AgroParisTech) - administered by the French Ministry of Agriculture;
  - Institut d'Optique Graduate School (IOGS, nicknamed SupOptique);
- In the Polytechnic Institute of Paris:
  - École polytechnique (l'X) – The most selective engineering school in France, administered by the French Ministry of Defense;
  - École nationale de la statistique et de l'administration économique (ENSAE ParisTech) – formed by the Institut National de la Statistique et des Études Économiques (INSEE : French Statistical Authority) and administered by the French Ministry for the Economy and Finance;
  - École nationale supérieure de techniques avancées (ENSTA ParisTech) administered by the French Ministry of Defense;
  - École nationale supérieure des télécommunications (Télécom Paris, administered by the French Ministry of Industry) – member of Institut Mines-Télécom (IMT);
  - École nationale des ponts et chaussées (École des Ponts ParisTech, administered by the French Ministry of Ecology, Sustainable Development and Energy, nicknamed les Ponts) – founded in 1747;
- In PSL University:
  - École nationale supérieure de chimie de Paris (Chimie ParisTech – PSL);
  - École nationale supérieure des mines de Paris (MINES Paris – PSL, administered by the French Ministry for Industry);
  - École supérieure de physique et de chimie industrielles de la ville de Paris (ESPCI Paris – PSL);
- Independent:
  - Arts et Métiers ParisTech (École nationale d'Arts et Métiers previously called ENSAM or les Arts et Metiers or "Les Arts", administered by the French Ministry of National Education, Higher Education and Research)

2. Centrale Graduate Schools of engineering; its students are commonly known as pistons (a reference to the piston engine, one of the centrepieces of the Industrial Revolution):

- CentraleSupélec, which is the result of the 2015 merger between École centrale Paris (ECP or Centrale Paris) founded in 1829, and École Supérieure d'Electricité (or Supélec) founded in 1894. Constituent Grande école of Paris-Saclay University.
- École centrale de Lille (ECLi, EC-Lille or Centrale Lille)
- École centrale de Lyon (ECL, EC-Lyon, or Centrale Lyon) was founded in 1857 as the École centrale lyonnaise pour l'Industrie et le Commerce
- École centrale de Marseille (ECM, EC-Marseille, or Centrale Marseille)
- École centrale de Nantes (ECN, EC-Nantes, or Centrale Nantes)

3. Institut National des Sciences Appliquées (INSA) network is the largest engineer training group in France, with 16,700+ students, administered by the French Ministry of National Education. It consists of grandes écoles distributed throughout mainland France:

- Institut National des Sciences Appliquées de Lyon – founded in 1957
- Institut National des Sciences Appliquées de Toulouse – founded in 1963
- Institut National des Sciences Appliquées de Rennes – founded in 1966
- Institut National des Sciences Appliquées de Rouen – founded in 1985
- Institut National des Sciences Appliquées de Strasbourg – founded in 2003
- Institut National des Sciences Appliquées de Centre Val de Loire – founded in 2014

4. National Polytechnic Institutes (INP)

- the Institut Polytechnique de Grenoble: includes the Grenoble Institute of Technology, and the Grenoble INP (formerly INPG) which has six departments (ENSIMAG, Ense3, Phelma, ESISAR, Génie Industriel, Pagora);
- the Institut National Polytechnique de Lorraine: includes the EEIGM, the European School of Materials Sciences and Engineering, the École Nationale Supérieure d'Agronomie et des Industries Alimentaires (ENSAIA, the National School of Agronomy and Food Sciences), the École Nationale Supérieure d'Électricité et de Mécanique (ENSEM, the National School of Electricity and Mechanics), the École Nationale Supérieure de Géologie (ENSG), the École nationale supérieure en génie des systèmes et de l'innovation (ENSGSI, the National School of Industrial Systems and Innovation), the École Nationale Supérieure des Industries Chimiques (ENSIC, the National School of Chemical Industries), the École Nationale Supérieure des Mines de Nancy (ENSMN, the National School of Mines of Nancy) and the École Nationale Supérieure d'Architecture de Nancy (ENSA Nancy, the School of Architecture));
- the Polytechnic Institute of Bordeaux : includes the ENSC, the ENSEIRB-MATMECA, the ENSCBP, the ENSTBB, the ENSEGID, and the ENSPIMA;
- the Polytechnic Institute of Clermont-Auvergne: includes the École polytechnique universitaire de Clermont-Auvergne, the Institut d'informatique d'Auvergne, the SIGMA Clermont.

5. Réseau Polytech schools of engineering, is a French network of 15 graduate schools of engineering within France's leading technological universities. All schools in the Group offer Master of Engineering degrees in various specialities:

- Polytech Angers, University of Angers
- Polytech Nancy (Polytech Nancy), University of Lorraine
- Polytech Grenoble, Grenoble Alpes University
- Polytech Lille, University of Lille
- Polytech Lyon, Claude Bernard University Lyon 1
- Polytech Marseille, Aix-Marseille University
- Polytech Montpellier, University of Montpellier
- Polytech Clermont-Ferrand, University of Clermont-Ferrand
- Polytech Nantes, University of Nantes
- Polytech Nice Sophia, Côte d'Azur University
- Polytech Orleans, University of Orleans
- Polytech Sorbonne, in the Sorbonne University
- Polytech Paris-Saclay, Paris-Saclay University.
- Polytech Savoie, University of Savoie Mont Blanc
- Polytech Tours, University of Tours

6. Écoles Nationales Supérieures d'Ingénieurs (ENSI), which encompasses approximately 40 grandes écoles:

- the École nationale supérieure d'électronique, d'électrotechnique, d'informatique, d'hydraulique, et de télécommunications (ENSEEIHT, nicknamed N7), considered the largest ENSI, with more than 400 graduates every year. It is one of the schools of the INP Toulouse;
- the École nationale supérieure d'ingénieurs de Caen (ENSICAEN);
- the École nationale supérieure d'ingénieurs de Bretagne Sud (ENSIBS);
- the École nationale supérieure d'ingénieurs de Poitiers (ENSI Poitiers);
- the École d'ingénieurs ENSIL-ENSCI (ENSIL-ENSCI);
- the École nationale supérieure en génie des systèmes et de l'innovation (ENSGSI);
- the École nationale supérieure des arts et industries textiles (ENSAIT);
- the École Nationale Supérieure d'Ingénieurs en Informatique Automatique Mécanique Énergétique Électronique (ENSIAME);

7. Institut Mines-Telecom schools of engineering

- École Nationale Supérieure des Mines Telecom Atlantique Bretagne Pays de la Loire (Telecom Bretagne and École des Mines de Nantes, merged 2017);
- École nationale supérieure des mines d'Albi
- École nationale supérieure des mines d'Alès
- École des Mines-Télécom de Lille-Douai (IMT Lille Douai)
- École nationale supérieure des mines de Paris (MINES ParisTech)(also member of ParisTech);
- École nationale supérieure des mines de Nancy
- École nationale supérieure des mines de Saint-Étienne
- École nationale supérieure des mines de Rabat
- École nationale supérieure des télécommunications (TELECOM ParisTech)
- Telecom SudParis (ex - Telecom INT). On the campus of Telecom & Management SudParis.
- Télécom Physique Strasbourg (ex - ENSPS)
- Institut Eurécom

8. École Nationale d'Ingénieurs (ENI) network is an engineer training group:

- the École nationale d'ingénieurs de Brest (ENIB)
- the École nationale d'ingénieurs de Metz (ENIM)
- the École Nationale d'Ingénieurs de Saint-Étienne (ENISE)
- the École nationale d'ingénieurs de Tarbes (ENIT)

9. Universités de technologie (UT) group: Compiègne (UTC), Troyes (UTT); Belfort-Montbéliard (UTBM)

10. Conservatoire National des Arts et Métiers

The following schools usually train each student for a more specific area in science or engineering:

11. Grandes écoles of Actuarial Sciences, Statistics and Econometrics

- the Institut de Science Financiere et d'Assurances (ISFA);
- the Institut de Statistiques de l'Université de Paris (ISUP).

12. Grandes écoles of Chemistry

- the École supérieure de chimie physique électronique de Lyon (ESCPE, or CPE-Lyon);
- the École nationale supérieure de chimie de Rennes (ENSCR);
- the École nationale supérieure de chimie de Lille (ENSCL);
- the École Nationale Supérieure de Chimie de Montpellier (ENSCM);
- the École européenne de Chimie, Polymères et Matériaux de Strasbourg (ECPM);

13. Grandes écoles of Physics

- the École supérieure de chimie physique électronique de Lyon (ESCPE, or CPE-Lyon);
- the Institut d'Optique Graduate School (IOGS, nicknamed SupOptique);
- the École supérieure de physique et de chimie industrielles de la ville de Paris (ESPCI ParisTech);
- the École nationale supérieure de chimie et de physique de Bordeaux (ENSCPB);
- the École nationale supérieure des ingénieurs en arts chimiques et technologiques (ENSIACET, nicknamed A7), also part of the INP Toulouse;
- the École nationale supérieure de l'électronique et de ses Applications (ENSEA);

14. Grandes écoles of Information Technology and Telecommunications

- The École Centrale d'Électronique (ECE Paris);
- the École nationale des sciences géographiques (ENSG - géomatique);
- the École supérieure d'informatique, électronique et automatique (ESIEA);
- the École pour l'informatique et les techniques avancées (EPITA);
- the École pour l'informatique et les nouvelles technologies (EPITECH);
- the École nationale supérieure d'électronique, informatique et radiocommunications de Bordeaux (ENSEIRB);
- the École supérieure angevine en informatique et productique (ESAIP);
- the École supérieure d'électronique de l'Ouest (Groupe ESEO);
- the École supérieure d'ingénieurs en génie électrique (ESIGELEC);
- the École catholique des arts et métiers (ECAM Lyon - Groupe ECAM);
- the École d'électricité, de production et des méthodes industrielles (EPMI - Groupe ECAM);
- the École d'ingénieur généraliste en informatique et technologies du numérique (EFREI);
- the École Internationale des Sciences du Traitement de l'Information (EISTI, now called CY Tech);
- the École nationale supérieure d'informatique pour l'industrie et l'enterprise (ENSIIE, previously IIE);
- the Institut supérieur d'électronique de Paris (ISEP);
- the Institut Superieur de l'electronique et du numerique (ISEN);
- the Institut d'informatique d'Auvergne (ISIMA);
- the Institut des Sciences et Techniques des Yvelines (ISTY);
- Telecom Nancy (ex - ESIAL);
- Télécom Saint-Étienne.

15. Grandes écoles of Applied Physics and Technology or Civil and Industrial Engineering

- the École des ingenieurs de la Ville de Paris (EIVP);
- the École nationale de l'aviation civile (ENAC), French civil aviation University;
- the École nationale supérieure de mécanique et d'aérotechnique (ENSMA, or ISAE-ENSMA, Mechanical Engineering);
- the École Nationale Supérieure de Mécanique et des Microtechniques (ENSMM, Mechanical Engineering);
- the École Supérieure d'Ingénieurs en Électrotechnique et Électronique (ESIEE Paris, Electrical & Computer Engineering / Industrial Engineering), administered by the French Ministry for the Economy and Finance - ESIEE Paris was established in 1904 and is part of the ESIEE network of graduate schools (Official website in English);
- the École Supérieure d'Ingénieurs en Électrotechnique et Électronique d'Amiens (ESIEE Amiens);
- the École Nationale des Travaux Publics de l'État (ENTPE, nicknamed TPE, Civil Engineering);
- the École Nationale Supérieure des Sciences Appliquées et de Technologie (ENSSAT);
- the École supérieure des techniques aéronautiques et de construction automobile (ESTACA or ISAE-ESTACA, Mechanical Engineering)
- the École spéciale des travaux publics, du Bâtiment et de l'Industrie (ESTP, Civil Engineering);
- the Institut polytechnique des sciences avancées (IPSA, Aeronautical and Aerospace Engineering);
- the Institut supérieur de l'aéronautique et de l'espace (ISAE-SUPAERO) - was formed by a merger of two institutes known as SUPAERO and ENSICA in Toulouse
- the Institut supérieur des matériaux du Mans (ISMANS);
- the École nationale supérieure de techniques avancées de Bretagne (ENSTA Bretagne, formerly ENSIETA), training French military engineers (25%) and civilian engineers (75%);
- the Institut Supérieur de Mécanique (SUPMECA, Mechanical Engineering);
- the SeaTech (Marine Engineering)
- the SIGMA Clermont (chemistry, mechanics)

16. Grandes écoles of Biology and other Natural Sciences

- the École nationale supérieure agronomique (ENSA), Paris (AgroParisTech), Montpellier (SupAgro), Rennes (Agrocampus Ouest), Toulouse (ENSAT), Nancy (ENSAIA), Bordeaux (Sciences Agro);
- the École supérieure de biotechnologie Strasbourg (ESBS);
- the École Nationale Supérieure de Géologie (ENSG), whose graduates are Géoliens;
- the Ecole et Observatoire des Sciences de la Terre (EOST), whose graduates are Eostiens;
- the École nationale du génie de l'eau et de l'environnement de Strasbourg (ENGEES);
- the École de Biologie Industrielle (EBI), whose graduates are Ebistes;
- the École supérieure d'agricultures d'Angers (ESA);
- the École d'ingénieurs de Purpan (EIPurpan), formerly École Supérieure d'Agriculture de Purpan (ESAP);
- the École nationale supérieure d'horticulture (ENSH);
- the Institut Sup'Biotech de Paris (Sup'Biotech).

17. Other private Grandes écoles offering multiple specialities

- the EPF School of Engineering known as "École Polytechnique Féminine", was only for women until 1994;
- the HEI - Hautes Etudes d'Ingénieur in Lille;
- the ESTIA Institute of Technology (École supérieure des technologies industrielles avancées in Biarritz), founded in 1985. A generalist engineering school, former IDLS;
- the École Speciale de Mecanique et d'Electricite also called ESME Sudria in Paris since 1905;
- the École supérieure d'ingénieurs de recherche en matériaux et en InfoTronique (ESIREM);
- the Centre des études supérieures industrielles (CESI);
- the École supérieure d'ingénieurs de Rennes (ESIR);

=== Business schools (grandes écoles de commerce) ===
Most French business schools are partly privately run, or managed by the regional chambers of commerce.

Business schools recruiting students just after taking the baccalauréat, most of them are private:

- ESSCA School of Management
- EDC Paris Business School
- ESCE International Business School
- ESDES School of Business and Management
- ESIEE Management
- European Business School Paris
- IESEG School of Management
- IPAG Business School
- ISG Business School
- PSB Paris School of Business

The below list contains French business schools that are officially part of the Conférence des grandes écoles.

Business schools recruiting students from post-baccalaureat preparatory classes, high selectivity rate:

- Audencia Business School
- Burgundy School of Business (École supérieure de commerce de Dijon)
- Brest Business School
- École de management de Normandie (Normandy Business School)
- Groupe ESC Pau
- ESC Rennes School of Business
- EDHEC Business School (NGO - Association 1901)
- EM Strasbourg Business School (École de Management de Strasbourg)
- Emlyon Business School
- ESC Clermont
- ESCP Business School
- ESSEC Business School
- Excelia Business School
- ESC Troyes
- Grenoble École de Management (GEM)
- HEC Paris
- ICN Business School
- INSEEC Business School (private)
- Institut supérieur du commerce de Paris (ISC Paris, private)
- KEDGE Business School
- Montpellier Business School
- NEOMA Business School
- Skema Business School
- Institut Mines-Télécom Business School
- ESC Toulouse School of Business

Business schools recruiting students with professional experience:

- INSEAD (Institut Européen d'Administration des Affaires)

=== Grandes écoles without preparatory classes ===
Some schools are accessible after a competitive entrance exam directly after the baccalauréat. Often, students of these schools will progress to an administrative school.

These schools include:

- École du Louvre, for archaeology, history of art and anthropology;
- École des Hautes Études en Sciences Sociales (EHESS), trains researchers in Social and Human Sciences, for sociology, history, geography, anthropology, linguistics, statistics;
- École Nationale Supérieure des Arts Décoratifs (part of PSL University);
- École Nationale Supérieure des Beaux-Arts, best known as "les Beaux-Arts" (for fine arts) (part of PSL University);
- École Nationale Supérieure d'Arts à la Villa Arson,
- École Nationale Supérieure de Création Industrielle,
- École nationale supérieure d'architecture de Lyon (ENSAL), for architecture;
- École Nationale Supérieure d'Architecture de Versailles (ENSAV), for architecture;
- École Nationale Supérieure d'Architecture de Saint-Etienne (ENSASE), for architecture;
- Instituts Nationaux des Sciences Appliquées (INSA) in Lyon, Rennes, Rouen, Strasbourg, Toulouse, Centre-Val de Loire (located in Blois and Bourges) delivering diplôme d'ingénieur degrees in five years including two preparatory years. The three remaining years are also accessible after selection for the best students graduating a first cycle university diploma, or from institutes of technology;
- Universités de Technologies (UTC, UTT, UTBM) in Compiègne, Troyes, Belfort, are also independent national schools delivering diplôme d'ingénieur and selecting students that graduated baccalaureat with top honours.

=== Universities that have joined the Conférence des grandes écoles ===
In 2004, Paris-Dauphine University joined the Conférence des grandes écoles and now has the status of university, grand établissement, and grande école.

- Paris-Dauphine University (part of PSL University)

=== Schools for Political Studies, Social Sciences, Journalism and Communication studies ===
These schools train students in multidisciplinary fields of social and human studies. Students are prepared for civil service and other public-sector leader positions, but more and more of them do end up working in the private sector. Some of these schools are reserved for French or EEA citizens only.

Institut d'études politiques (IEP, Sciences Po)

- Sciences Po (also known as Sciences Po Paris, most prestigious and selective among all)
- Sciences Po Bordeaux (part of the University of Bordeaux)
- Sciences Po Lille (part of the University of Lille)
- Sciences Po Rennes (part of the University of Rennes)
- Sciences Po Strasbourg (part of the University of Strasbourg)
- Sciences Po Aix
- Sciences Po Grenoble (part of the University of Grenoble-Alpes)
- Sciences Po Lyon (part of the University of Lyon Alliance)
- Sciences Po Saint-Germain-en-Laye (part of the University of Versailles)
- Sciences Po Toulouse (part of the University of Toulouse-Capitole)

Grandes Écoles of Journalism and communication studies

- CELSA Paris (part of Sorbonne University);
- Centre de Formation des Journalistes (part of Assas University);
- Sciences Po Journalism School (part of Sciences Po);
- Sciences Po Rennes Journalism School (part of Sciences Po Rennes);

Other Grandes Écoles

- Institut national du service public (INSP), (formerly École nationale d'administration)
- École Nationale de la Magistrature (Bordeaux) (ENM), which trains judicial magistrates;
- École nationale supérieure des sciences de l'information et des bibliothèques (Lyon) (ENSSIB), which trains library and information managers (part of the University of Lyon Alliance);
- École des Hautes Études en Santé Publique (Rennes) (Ecole des hautes études en santé publique (EHESP) | Ecole des hautes études en santé publique), trains managers of hospitals and other leaders and technical experts in public health and health care;

=== Military officer academies ===
Today, there are only 3 grandes écoles that are officially denominated as military academies of the French Republic.

- The École Spéciale Militaire de Saint-Cyr, formerly located in Saint-Cyr-l'École but now in Coëtquidan in Brittany, is the Army Academy. Nicknamed Saint-Cyr, its graduates and students are cyrards but are generally referred to as saint-cyriens;
- The École de l'Air (EA) is the Air Force Academy, located in Salon-de-Provence;
- The École Navale (EN) is nicknamed Navale and its graduates and students are Bordaches. It is located in Brest.

While École polytechnique is also under supervision of the French Ministry of Defence, it is no longer officially a military academy. Only a small number of its students progress to military careers, while between a fifth and a quarter choose to remain in France to work for the state's technical administrations.

There are also other specialized military "grandes écoles":

- The École de santé des armées, located in Lyon for the training of army doctors and pharmacists.
- The École nationale de la sécurité et de l'administration de la mer for the military officers and civil servants of the French Maritime Administration
- The École des commissaires des armées (ECA), training military officers in charge of all the support functions (management, purchasing, finance, human support, human resources, legal advice, decision support, logistics)

== Facts and influence in French culture ==
Altogether, grandes écoles awarded approximately 60,000 master's degrees in 2013, compared with 150,000 master's degrees awarded by all French higher institutions in the same year, including universities.

Grande école graduates in 2013 represent 10% of the French population graduating from high school 5 years before (600,000 in 2008).

Some grandes écoles are renowned in France for their selectivity and the complexity of their curriculum. In the press, they are usually called the "A+" schools, referring to the grade given by some rankings. These elite schools represent less than 1% of the higher education students in France.

Admission to a certain number of these institutions (e.g. l'Ecole Nationale de la Magistrature in Bordeaux) is reserved only to French citizens, raising questions relating to European mobility and institutional reciprocity.

Since 1975, the Comité d'études sur les formations d'ingénieurs has studied the questions of training and job placement for engineers graduating from grandes écoles.

=== Notable alumni ===
Of the 26 persons who have served as President of France or as a French head of state since the election of Louis-Napoleon Bonaparte, 16 attended a Grande école.

President of France	In Office	Grande école(s)
Patrice de MacMahon	1873 – 1879	École spéciale militaire de Saint-Cyr
Sadi Carnot	1887 – 1894	École Polytechnique; École des ponts ParisTech
Paul Deschanel	1920 – 1920	Sciences Po
Paul Doumer	1931 – 1932	Conservatoire national des arts et métiers
Albert Lebrun	1932 – 1940	École Polytechnique; Mines ParisTech
Philippe Pétain	1940 – 1944	École spéciale militaire de Saint-Cyr
Charles de Gaulle	1944 – 1946	École spéciale militaire de Saint-Cyr
Léon Blum	1946 – 1947	École normale supérieure (Paris)
Charles de Gaulle	1959 – 1969	École spéciale militaire de Saint-Cyr
Alain Poher (Acting)	1969; 1974	Mines ParisTech; Sciences Po
Georges Pompidou	1969 – 1974	Sciences Po; École normale supérieure (Paris)
Valéry Giscard d'Estaing	1974 – 1981	École Polytechnique; École nationale d'administration
François Mitterrand	1981 – 1995	Sciences Po
Jacques Chirac	1995 – 2007	Sciences Po; École nationale d'administration
Nicolas Sarkozy	2007 - 2012	Sciences Po
François Hollande	2012 – 2017	HEC Paris; Sciences Po; École nationale d'administration
Emmanuel Macron	2017 – present	Sciences Po; École nationale d'administration

Many winners of the Nobel prize attended a Grande école

Nobel laureate	Year	Category	Grande école(s)
Henri Becquerel	1903	Physics	École polytechnique; École nationale des ponts et chaussées
Henri Moissan	1906	Chemistry	École pratique des hautes études
Gabriel Lippmann	1908	Physics	École normale supérieure (Paris)
Paul Sabatier	1912	Chemistry	École normale supérieure (Paris)
Romain Rolland	1915	Literature	École normale supérieure (Paris)
Jean Baptiste Perrin	1926	Physics	École normale supérieure (Paris)
Henri Bergson	1927	Literature	École normale supérieure (Paris)
Frédéric Joliot-Curie	1935	Chemistry	ESPCI Paris
Roger Martin du Gard	1937	Literature	École Nationale des Chartes
François Mauriac	1952	Literature	École Nationale des Chartes
Jean-Paul Sartre	1964	Literature	École normale supérieure (Paris)
Alfred Kastler	1966	Physics	École normale supérieure (Paris)
Louis Néel	1970	Physics	École normale supérieure (Paris)
Gérard Debreu	1983	Economics	École normale supérieure (Paris)
Maurice Allais	1988	Economics	École Polytechnique; Mines ParisTech
Pierre-Gilles de Gennes	1991	Physics	École normale supérieure (Paris)
Georges Charpak	1992	Physics	Mines Paris
Claude Cohen-Tannoudji	1997	Physics	École normale supérieure (Paris)
Yves Chauvin	2005	Chemistry	École Supérieure de Chimie Physique Électronique de Lyon
Albert Fert	2007	Physics	École normale supérieure (Paris)
Serge Haroche	2012	Physics	École normale supérieure (Paris)
Jean Tirole	2014	Economics	[[École nationale des ponts et chaussées|École polytechnique; École nationale des ponts et chaussées]]
Jean-Pierre Sauvage	2016	Chemistry	École nationale de chimie de Strasbourg
Esther Duflo	2019	Economics	École normale supérieure (Paris); École des Hautes Études en Sciences Sociales
Alain Aspect	2022	Physics	École normale supérieure Paris-Saclay
Anne L'Huillier	2023	Physics	École normale supérieure de Fontenay-aux-Roses
Philippe Aghion	2025	Economics	École normale supérieure Paris-Saclay
Michel Devoret	2025	Physics	Télécom Paris

Many Fields Medal laureates attended a grande école. All the laureates listed below were educated at the École normale supérieure in Paris.

Fields Medal laureate	Year	Grande école
Laurent Schwartz	1950	École normale supérieure
Jean-Pierre Serre	1954	École normale supérieure
René Thom	1958	École normale supérieure
Alain Connes	1982	École normale supérieure
Pierre-Louis Lions	1994	École normale supérieure
Jean-Christophe Yoccoz	1994	École normale supérieure
Laurent Lafforgue	2002	École normale supérieure
Wendelin Werner	2006	École normale supérieure
Ngô Bảo Châu	2010	École normale supérieure
Cédric Villani	2010	École normale supérieure
Hugo Duminil-Copin	2022	École normale supérieure

== See also ==
- Academic grading in France
- Commission des titres d'ingénieur
- Conférence des directeurs des écoles françaises d'ingénieurs (CDEFI)
- Conférence des grandes écoles (CGE)
- Education in France
- Grands établissements
- List of universities in France
- List of public universities in France
- Superior Graduate Schools in Italy
- Velika škola in Belgrade, Serbia
