= Diplôme d'Ingénieur =

French postgraduate engineering degree

- Acronym: Ing.
- Type: Master's degree
- Duration: Five years
- Regions: France
- Prerequisites: Baccalauréat

The Diplôme d'Ingénieur (French: [diplom dɛ̃ʒenjœʁ], often abbreviated as Dipl.Ing.) is a postgraduate degree in engineering usually awarded by the Grandes Écoles in engineering. It is generally obtained after five to seven years of studies after the Baccalauréat.

Each holder of the diplôme d'ingénieur is also conferred the title of Ingénieur diplômé (graduate engineer). This is distinguished from the term 'ingénieur' (engineer) which is less regulated. The diplôme d'ingénieur is recognized as a combined Bachelor's/Master's (BS/MS) in Engineering in the United States and European Union countries (also in France and its previous colonies).

Most Grandes Ecoles allow their students to join a double degree with a university (in France or abroad). Furthermore, Diplôme d'ingénieur graduates can pursue a selective PhD after their engineering studies to join academia or an industrial R&D department later.

In Germany, the traditional engineer's degree is pronounced similarly to the French one: Diplom-Ingenieur (Dipl. -Ing.)

== Accreditation ==
The title Ingénieur diplômé is strictly regulated in France and North Africa and protected by the state.

In France, any institution issuing the diplôme d'ingénieur must be accredited by the Commission des titres d'ingénieur (within the Ministry of Higher Education and Research in France) which is the official administrative body responsible for evaluating higher education institutions to train professional engineers. Anyone found to be misusing the title of Ingénieur diplômé is liable to a €15,000 fine and a one-year sentence in prison.

In Morocco, any institution issuing the "Diplôme d'Ingénieur d'État" must be accredited by the Moroccan state.

Since the signing of the Bologna Process in 1999, the European Master's Degree is also conferred by the state to the holder of a diplôme d'ingénieur.

The diplôme d'ingénieur is also recognized in the United States by the AACRAO since 2013 as "Master of Science in Engineering" without the need to have an intermediary bachelor's degree.

== Grandes Écoles and Universities ==
France, Morocco, and Tunisia are particular in that it is mainly the Grandes Écoles in engineering that is accredited and is certified to issue the diplôme d'ingénieur, which is differentiated from bachelor's and master's degrees in engineering issued by public universities (Universités). Many of the most prestigious Grandes Écoles are members of the Conférence des Grandes écoles.

Universities in France, Morocco, and Tunisia are comprehensive institutions composed of several faculties covering various fields (natural sciences, engineering, law, economics, medicine, humanities, etc.) with a large student body. On the other hand, Grandes Écoles in engineering are much smaller in size and recruit their students with more selective processes (typically a few hundred students per year per institution, and a few thousand students per year country-wide).

== Curriculum ==
Student engineers in Grandes Écoles are educated in close cooperation with the various industries through academic-industry partnerships, which introduce graduates to professional life while giving them a solid grounding in their discipline. As many graduates will advance to positions leading future projects and teams, courses related to management and professional training are also included in the curriculum.

In addition to the core curriculum in engineering and science, the engineer training often includes, and is not limited to:

- courses in humanities and social sciences
- courses in business administration
- visits to production sites
- conferences and career talks by professionals
- internships and research projects

== Professional training ==
More than 90 percent of the engineering programs require at least one internship (typically in a business setting) at some point in the curriculum.

Most schools arrange three types of internships that train the students with progressive responsibilities, initially as observers and increasingly as actors, to gain a comprehensive understanding and perspective of all levels of responsibility and roles within the industry. One can distinguish "worker" (blue-collar) internships, "senior technician" internships, and "graduate" internships where the students perform the same type of work they will do as graduate engineers. Internships are graded and constitute part of the academic degree requirements.

== Titre d'ingénieur diplômé par l'État (DPE) ==
The Titre d'ingénieur diplômé par l'État (DPE) is awarded to candidates with five years of experience in "professional practice in functions commonly assigned to engineers" and who have passed specific tests. These are organized by engineering schools according to a set list. For example, for the "Chemistry" specialty, the schools organizing these tests are: the École Nationale Supérieure des Ingénieurs en Arts Chimiques et Technologiques, the Conservatoire national des arts et métiers, the École Supérieure de Chimie Physique Électronique de Lyon, the Institut textile et chimique, the Institut national des sciences appliquées de Rouen, the École européenne de chimie, polymères et matériaux, and the École nationale supérieure de chimie de Lille.

The first test is an "assessment of the candidate's experience and professional skills" in the form of an interview with the jury. If successful, the second test is a dissertation defense, followed by a discussion with the jury. The jury's opinion is then forwarded to the national jury, which makes the final decision.

== See also ==
- Memorandum of understanding
