= École nationale supérieure d'informatique pour l'industrie et l'entreprise =

French computing school

Coordinates: 48°37′36″N 2°25′55″E

- Type: Grande école
- Established: 1968; 58 years ago
- Affiliations: Institut Mines-Télécom, University of Paris-Saclay (associate member)
- Director: Imed Boughzala
- Location: Évry, France
- Campus: Pôle scientifique d'Évry Val-de-Seine,
- Website: www.ensiie.fr

The École nationale supérieure d'informatique pour l'industrie et l'entreprise (French pronunciation: [ekɔl nɑsjɔnal sypeʁjœʁ dɛ̃fɔʁmatik puʁ lɛ̃dystʁi e lɑ̃tʁəpʁiz]; transl. "National School of Computer Science for Industry and Business"; abbr. ensIIE), formerly known as Institut d'informatique d'entreprise ([ɛ̃stity dɛ̃fɔʁmatik dɑ̃tʁəpʁiz]), is a French public grande école specialising in computer science and applied mathematics, It is one of the 204 French engineering schools authorized to award an engineering degree, with its most recent accreditation granted on September 1, 2020 by the CTI.

Founded in 1968, it is located in Évry-Courcouronnes, in the Essonne. The school operates under the authority of the French Ministry of Higher Education and Research. Since 2016, student admissions have been based on the Mines-Télécom entrance examination.

ensIIE is a member of the Conférence des grandes écoles (CGE) and is affiliated with both the Université Paris-Saclay and the Institut Mines-Télécom.

ensIIE is one of the oldest computer science schools in France. It provides technical and scientific training based on the triptych of Computer Science – Applied Mathematics – Business and Finance, while maintaining close ties with industry and the corporate world.

ensIIE offers three types of Engineering Degree Programs:

- An initial full-time program (FISE), primarily for students from Preparatory Classes for Grandes Écoles.
- A work-study program (FISA), primarily for students from University Institutes of Technology (IUT).
- A continuing education program (FC), primarily for professionals returning to higher education.

Students can be admitted to ensIIE through the selective Concours Mines-Télécom examination, after a strong competition during two years of undergraduate studies in classes préparatoires aux grandes écoles. The selection was done on the Concours Centrale-Supélec examination before 2015. Students can also be admitted through parallel admissions, coming from various IUT as well as multiplie faculties all around France, along with a number of international students through partnerships.

The school belongs to prestigious groups of institutions such as Institut Mines-Télécom, or University of Paris-Saclay (associate member).

The ensIIE Engineering School was created by the Conservatoire National des Arts et Métiers in 1968.

Initially located in Paris, it is now in Évry (France).

In 2025, the ensIIE benefits from a network of over 4900 alumni, engineers who have graduated from the school under any major or type of training.

== History ==
Founded in 1968 by Paul Namian, a lecturer at CNAM, within the Conservatoire national des arts et métiers, the Institut d'Informatique d'Entreprise (IIE) was initially located in Paris, within the CNAM premises. The first student cohorts were very small, with no more than thirty students, but quickly expanded. In July 2006, the institute became the École nationale supérieure d'informatique pour l'industrie et l'entreprise (ensIIE), and was established as a public administrative institution attached to the Université d'Évry-Val-d'Essonne. From 2006 to 2008: Florent Chavand, Director.

From 2008 to 2018: Ménad Sidahmed, Director. During this period, ENSIIE gained expanded responsibilities and competencies (RCE).

Between 2009 and 2017, the school operated a satellite campus in Strasbourg, in Alsace. It hosted approximately 50 students per class but was closed due to lack of funding.

In 2015, the school joined the Télécom INT entrance exam, which later became the Mines-Télécom entrance exam following its merger with the Mines Schools Common Entrance Exam.

In 2016, a merger with Télécom SudParis was considered but was eventually abandoned.

In 2017, the school became affiliated with Université Paris-Saclay and the Institut Mines-Télécom.

=== Admissions ===
Students admitted to ensIIE may come from:

- The Concours Centrale-Supélec, from 1974 until 2014 (preparatory tracks MP, PSI, PC, and TSI).
- The score pool of the Mines-Télécom entrance exam since 2015 (Mines-Télécom Exam, preparatory tracks: MP – 65 seats, PSI – 18 seats, MPI – 15 seats, PC – 10 seats, and TSI – 2 seats).
- The national DEUG exam – 2 seats until 2022.
- Admissions based on academic qualifications for holders of a BUT / DUT, a BTS followed by a ATS preparatory program, a Licence degree, or any equivalent qualification in computer science or mathematics.

Admission into the second year is possible via academic qualifications, for holders of a Master 1 / Master 2 or an equivalent degree in computer science or mathematics.

== Academic studies ==
Courses last 3 years, and the final year can be done in a foreign university, such as the University of Manchester (UK), Oxford University (UK), Aston University (UK), Université de Sherbrooke (Canada). Some of these collaborations will enable the student to obtain both the ENSIIE degree and the master's degree of the host university.

There also exist multiple partnerships with other international universities that do not involve a double degree in which the students can take a part of. The full list can be found on the official website.

=== First-Year Core Curriculum ===
During the 1st and 2nd semesters, all students follow the same courses, organized into four major modules:

- Digital Computer Science
- Applied Mathematics and Quantitative Methods
- Economics and Management, Entrepreneurship
- Personal Development, Languages (Soft Skills)

These courses are designed to provide students with the scientific foundations and essential tools for their future careers as engineers. These core skills enable them to adapt to and keep pace with the rapid evolution of the digital world.

=== Tracks Starting in the Second Year ===
==== Applied Mathematics Track ====
Operations research, stochastic control, financial mathematics, machine learning, deep learning, digital finance, data science

==== Software Engineering and Cybersecurity Track ====
Software architecture, systems, security, secure programming, sustainable computing

==== High-Performance Computing and Big Data Track (HPC/Big Data) ====
Cloud computing, parallel and distributed programming, high-performance architectures, operations research, sustainable computing, quantum computing

==== Video Games and Digital Interactions Track (in partnership with Télécom SudParis) ====
Video games, augmented reality, virtual reality

=== Internships ===
Students complete approximately one year of internship experience over the course of their studies, with one internship each year:

- 8 to 13 weeks in the first year (Programming and Development Internship)
- 10 to 13 weeks in the second year (Design and Development Internship)
- 5 to 6 months in the third year (Design, Technology Watch, and Innovation Internship)

== International Dual Degrees ==
=== Foreign University ===
During the second or third year of studies, ensIIE offers students the opportunity to complete part of their education at a foreign university, often as part of a dual curriculum program, which can lead to obtaining a foreign degree, such as a Master of Science (MSc).

=== Dual Degrees in France ===
==== Dual Degree Engineer - Engineer (ensIIE - Télécom SudParis) ====
This dual degree aims to offer a select number of students high-level training, combining expertise in computer science (ensIIE) and telecommunications (Télécom SudParis), within two recognized public graduate schools, both located in Évry-Courcouronnes. Students complete at least 3 semesters in each school.

Upon completion of the program and subject to validation:

- ensIIE Engineering Degree
- Engineering Degree from Télécom SudParis – Institut Mines-Télécom Institut Mines Télécom, with a specialization in FISE or FISA depending on the chosen path.

Opening in September 2025.

==== Dual Degree Engineer - Manager (ensIIE - Institut Mines-Télécom Business School) ====
After the first two years at ensIIE, students have the opportunity to complete their curriculum by spending two additional years at Institut Mines-Télécom Business School, to obtain a dual engineer-manager degree.

==== Entrepreneurship Major (Certifying Mobility) ====
Students have the opportunity to follow the major "Innovation, Design and Committed Entrepreneurship" (IDEE) at the Institut Mines-Télécom Business School, Telecom SudParis, ensIIE, and the ESAD Reims.

==== Bachelor's Degree in Dual Curriculum (L3) ====
In the first year, students can obtain a Bachelor's degree in Mathematics (L3) from Université d'Évry Paris Saclay. Each year, approximately 70% of first-year students enroll and obtain the degree.

==== Master 1 in Dual Curriculum (M1) ====
In the second year, students following the Applied Mathematics track can simultaneously pursue the M1 in Applied Mathematics from Université Paris-Saclay.

==== Master 2 in Dual Curriculum (M2) ====
The final year can also be part of a dual curriculum: some students may choose to take courses for a master's degree, in parallel with their studies at the school. Most often, this master's degree replaces the choice of one or more options in the traditional curriculum.

This includes the following master's degrees cooperated with Université Paris-Saclay:

- Master Parisien de Recherche Opérationnelle (MPRO) - Institut polytechnique de Paris
- Master "Quantitative Finance" (M2QF)
- Master "Data Sciences: Health, Insurance, Finance" (M2DS)
- Master "Risk and Asset Management" (GRA)
- Master "Innovation, Market and Data Science" (IMSD) - dual degree also open to apprenticeship students
- Master "Statistical, Economic and Financial Modeling" (MoSEF) - Université Paris 1 Panthéon-Sorbonne
- Master "Artificial Intelligence" (AI)
- Master "Software and Systems Design and Intelligence" (CILS)
- Master "Virtual Reality and Augmented Systems" (RVSI)
- Master "Foundations of Computer Science and Software Engineering" (FIIL)
- Master "Large Scale Data Management and Knowledge Extraction" (DataScale)
- Master "Information Processing and Data Exploitation" (TRIED)
- Master "Mathematics, Vision, Learning" (MVA) - selective
- Master "Security of Contents, Networks, Telecommunications and Systems" (SeCReTS)

== Research ==
A significant number of teachers at ensIIE are teacher-researchers, and thus have a research mission to fulfill.

The research teams associated with the school work on the following main themes: Stochastic control in finance, Combinatorial optimization, Program specification and verification, Statistical learning.

This work is carried out in laboratories associated with ensIIE.

Distribution of ensIIE teacher-researchers (December 2024):

Laboratory	Institution	Affiliation, Supervision or Participation	Distribution of Teacher-Researchers
SAMOVAR (Distributed Services, Architectures, Modeling, Validation, Network Administration)	Télécom SudParis, Institut Mines-Télécom, Institut polytechnique de Paris	38.5%	
LaMME (Laboratory of Mathematics and Modeling of Évry)	Université d'Évry Paris Saclay, CNRS, ENSIIE, INRAE, Université Paris-Saclay	38.5%	
Cédric (Center for Studies and Research in Computer Science and Communications)	Conservatoire national des arts et métiers	7.7%	
IBISC (Computer Science, Bioinformatics, Complex Systems)	Université d'Évry Paris Saclay, Université Paris-Saclay	7.7%	
Centre Borelli	CNRS, École normale supérieure Paris-Saclay, INSERM, Service de santé des armées, Université Paris-Cité	3.8%	
LISN (Interdisciplinary Laboratory of Digital Sciences)	CNRS, Université Paris-Saclay, INRIA, CentraleSupélec	3.8%	

== Innovation and Entrepreneurship ==
ensIIE has a cluster, C-19 (Video Games & Digital Interactions) and is a member of an incubator, IMT Starter (a joint incubator of Télécom SudParis, the Institut Mines Télécom Business School and ensIIE).

Furthermore, the school participates in the "Entrepreneurial Projects Challenge" with Télécom SudParis and the Institut Mines Télécom Business School.

Each summer, the school offers students an entrepreneurial experience through the SUMMER SCHOOL program. Organized by IMT Starter and C-19, this program brings together engineering and management students from ensIIE, Institut Mines-Télécom Business School and Télécom SudParis each year, offering them the opportunity to step into the shoes of a young entrepreneur and transform their ideas/projects into innovative start-ups.

== Associations ==
In April 2017, the school joined the Institut Mines-Télécom as well as Université Paris-Saclay.

== Rankings ==
National Rankings:

Name	2019 (Rank)	2020 (Rank)	2022 (Rank)	2023 (Rank)	2024 (Rank)	2025 (Rank)
L'Étudiant		43			91	55
Daur Rankings	48	34	37	51	51	
Usine Nouvelle	54	54	72	53	66	
Le Figaro Student Computer Science Ranking				3	3	3

== Student life ==
More than 50 clubs and associations share the school's facilities, some of which are recognized at the national level.

== Notable alumni ==
- Mahammed Dionne (1983), Prime Minister of Senegal.
- Marie-Agnès Bousquet (1987), deputy director of Hachette Éducation.
- Olivier Sevillia (1987), Chairman, Senior advisor, Former n°2 of Capgemini Group.
- Anthony Attia (1998), Managing director and Chief Executive Officer of ASX and ex-Chief Executive Officer of Euronext Paris.
- Christophe Devine (2003), inventor of the software Aircrack.
- Antoine Saout (2008), poker player.
