= Paris-Saclay =

French research-intensive and business cluster

Coordinates: 48°42′36″N 2°10′09″E

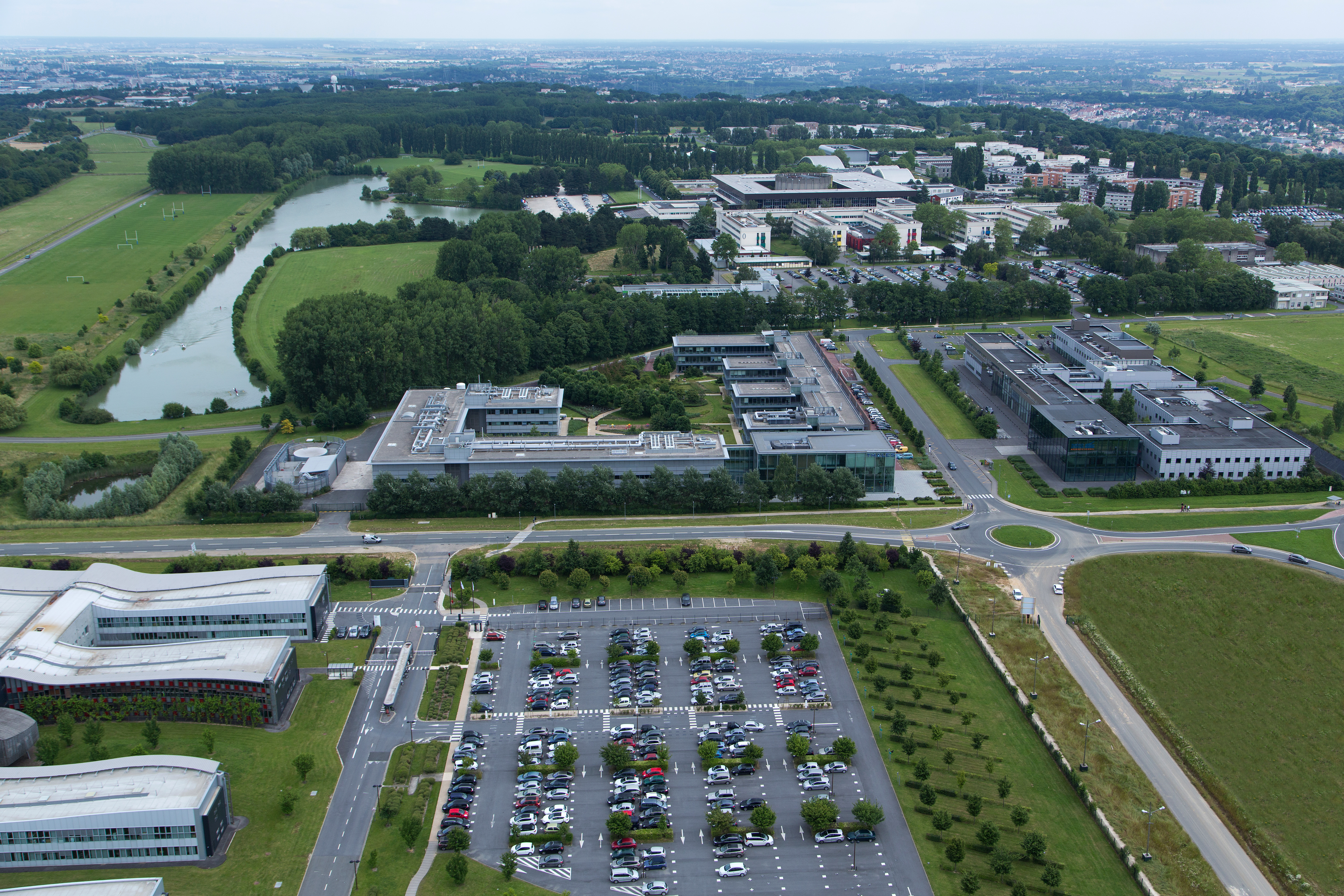
- Established: from 1950s, and to 2020
- Academic staff: 10,500 professors/researchers
- Students: up to 60,000, including 25,000 in master degree and 5,700 PhD students
- Location: several neighboring cities and places (Plateau de Saclay, Saint-Quentin-en-Yvelines, Versailles, Massy, Essonne, vallée de l'Yvette), Île-de-France, France
- Affiliations: research institutions (e.g. CNRS, CEA, INRIA, INSERM); higher education institutions merged into Paris-Saclay University (e.g. CentraleSupélec, ENS Paris-Saclay, Agro ParisTech (2021)); higher education institutions merged into Polytechnic Institute of Paris (e.g. Ecole Polytechnique, ENSAE ParisTech, ENSTA ParisTech, Telecom Paris); R&D centres and companies (e.g. Technocentre Renault, Danone, Thales Group, Hewlett-Packard, Nokia)
- Website: paris-saclay.business
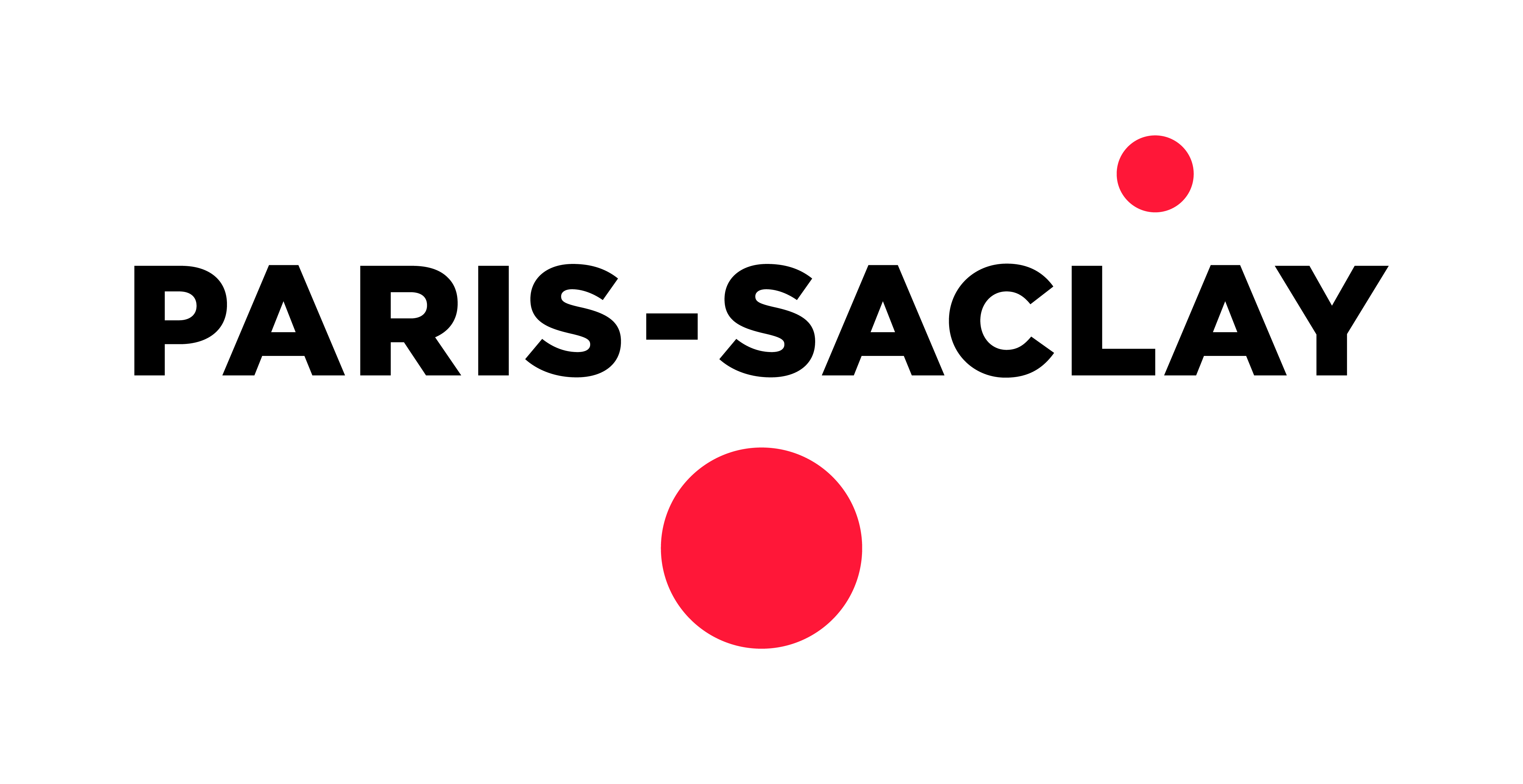

Paris-Saclay is a research-intensive and business cluster currently under construction in the south of Paris, France. It encompasses research facilities, two French major universities with higher education institutions (grandes écoles) and also research centers of private companies. In 2013, the Technology Review put Paris-Saclay in the top 8 world research clusters. In 2014, it comprised almost 15% of French scientific research capacity.

The earliest settlements are from the 1950s, and this area was subsequently extended several times during the 1970s and 2000s. Several projects are underway to continue the development of the campus, including the relocation of some facilities.

The area is now home to many of the Europe's largest high-tech corporations, and to the two French universities Paris-Saclay University (CentraleSupélec, ENS Paris-Saclay, Paris-Saclay Faculty of Science, etc.) and the Polytechnic Institute of Paris (École Polytechnique, Telecom Paris, etc.). The Paris-Saclay University was ranked 15th in the world in the 2023 ARWU ranking. It was also placed 1st in the world for Mathematics and 9th in the world for Physics (1st in Europe).

The goal was to strengthen the cluster to build an international scientific and technological hub that can compete with other high-technology business districts, such as Silicon Valley or Cambridge, MA. This project started in 2006 and is likely to end in 2022. The main part is the construction of the campus du plateau de Saclay.

== History ==
=== First post-war settlement ===
Several French national institutions settled on the plateau after the end of World War II. The CNRS is the first to settle there, headed by Frédéric Joliot-Curie, who bought the estate Button at Gif-sur-Yvette in 1946. The following year, the newly created CEA (the High Commissioner is also Joliot-Curie) to purchase land. The same year, ONERA settles on the plateau in Palaiseau. The Saclay center was inaugurated in 1952.

At the same time, higher education institutions settled nearby. The University of Paris is also up in the region in 1955 with the purchase of 50 hectares in the communes of Orsay and Bures. This Orsay campus brings laboratories of the Paris Faculty of Sciences (later the University of Paris-Sud) and moved to 1956. Other institutions followed with the installation of HEC in 1964 with its move to the town of Jouy-en-Josas, then with the arrival of the École supérieure d'optique in 1965 on the Orsay campus.

Research centers related to private companies also settled at that time in 1968 with the arrival of the Central Research Laboratory of Thomson-CSF.

=== Second wave of settlement in the 1970s ===
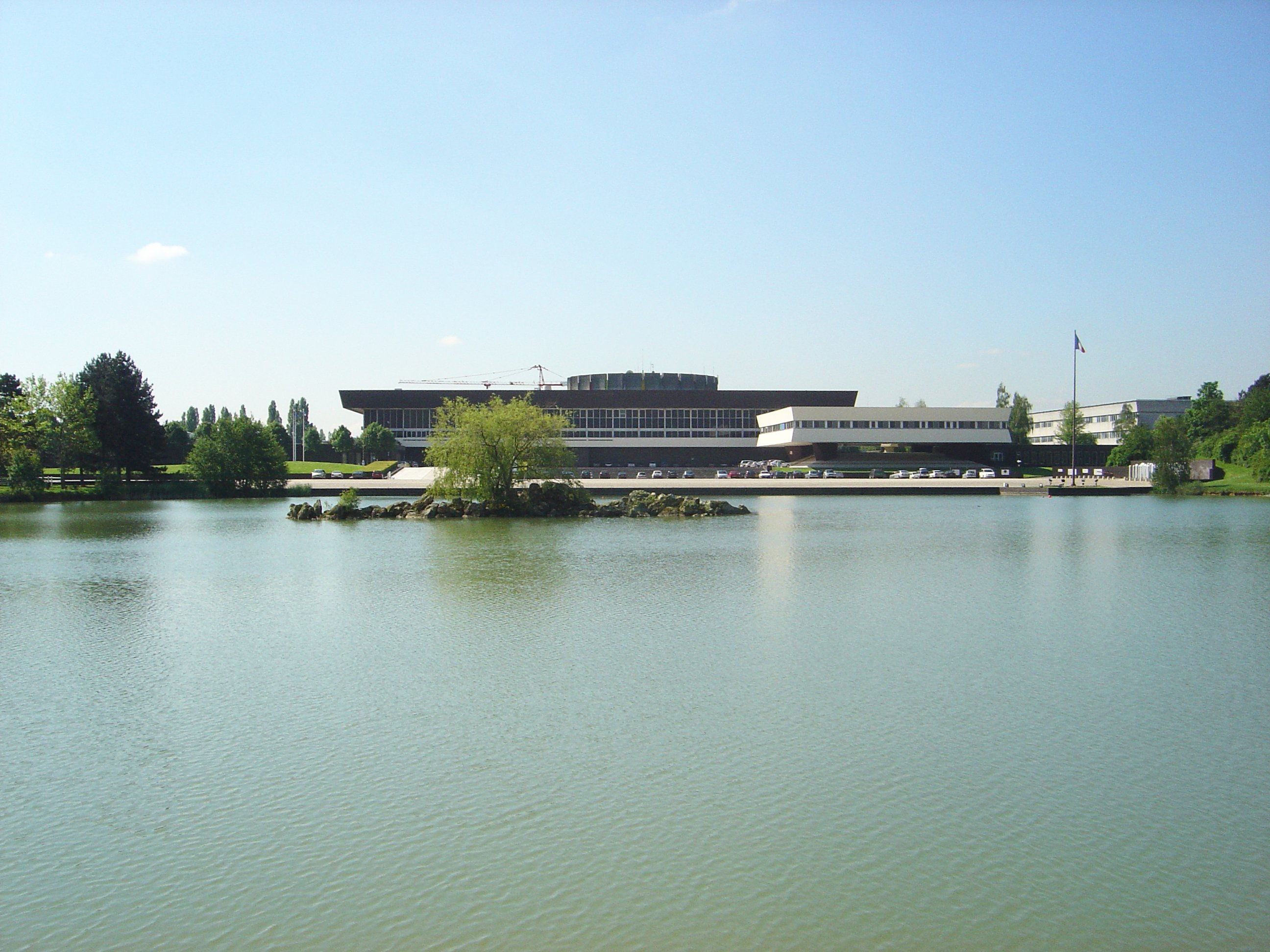
Ecole Polytechnique France seen from lake

In the 1970s, the École polytechnique and Supélec settled on the plateau, the first in 1976 in the Palaiseau area, the other in 1975 in the Moulon area. The project had a scheduled time to install other schools soon after. The Moulon farm which currently houses the genetics and plant breeding was restored in 1978.

Institutions on the plateau at this time begin to join together in an association d'établissements scientifiques (association of scientific institutions, AES) to reflect future developments of the area.

=== Third wave of the 2000s ===
At the beginning of the twenty-first century, research centers of private companies settled on the campus. In 2000, Danone chooses to establish a center for Research and Development in the area of Palaiseau, joined in 2006 by Thales laboratories, and in 2009 by Kraft Foods which invests €15 million to install one of its expertise global centers. Other projects removal were also studied, including a research center of EDF, studied in 2010.

Two thematic advanced research are also on the campus, with the creation of Digiteo and Triangle de la physique in 2006. SOLEIL, which creation was decided in 2000 after three years of opposition of Claude Allègre, was inaugurated the same year, built with a budget of 313 million euros. The project of neuroimaging center NeuroSpin is launched in 2006 also on the plateau.

The first building constructed specifically for the campus is the Pôle commun de recherche en informatique (Joint Research Cluster Computing), which was inaugurated in November 2011.

=== Development projects ===
The proposed new construction and renovation of campus was launched by President Nicolas Sarkozy who wants to create a "French Silicon Valley". The entire project is estimated to three billion euros funding.

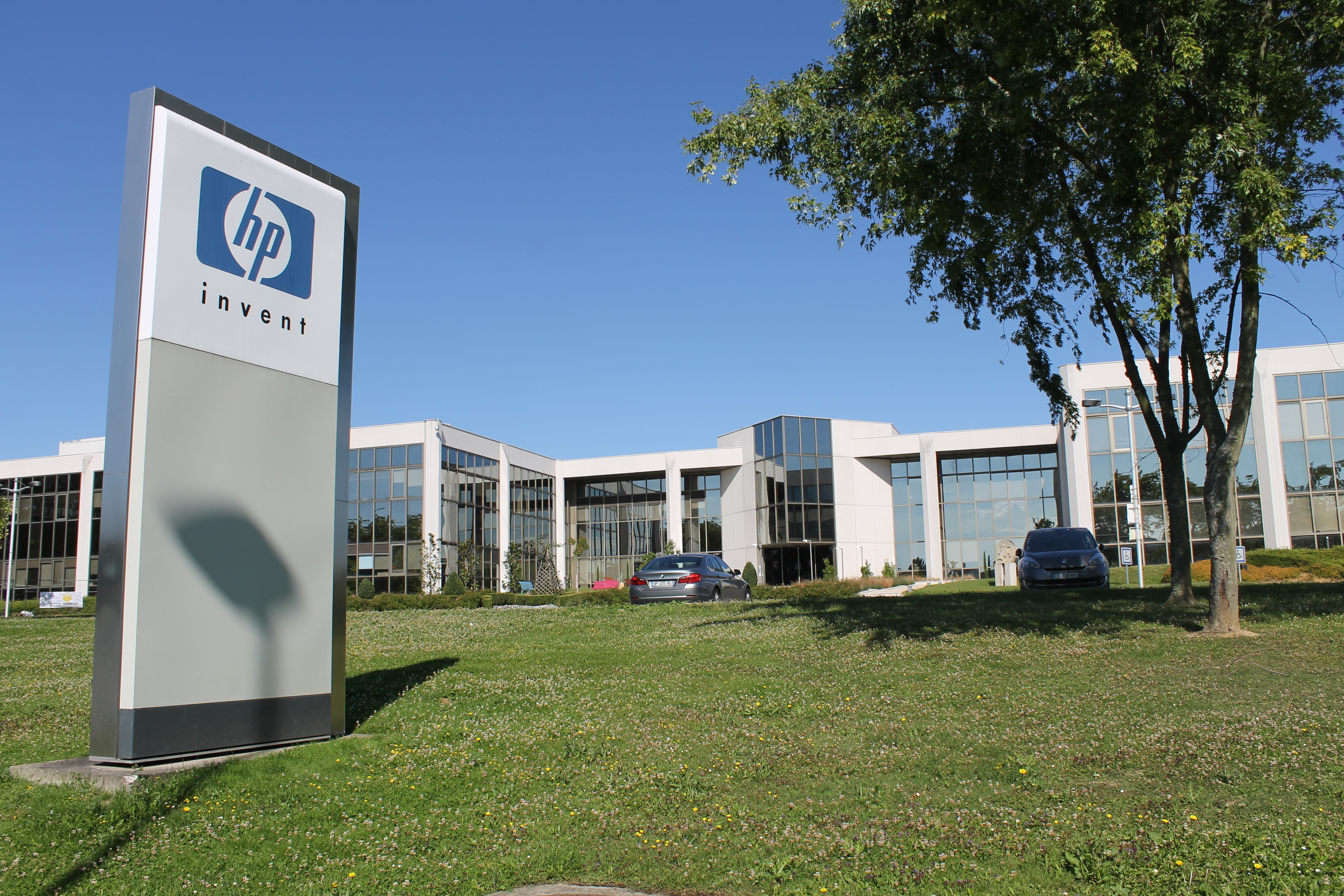
The research center of Hewlett-Packard in the Paris-Saclay cluster, France.

The different steps to set up the campus are part of several government operations.

- The opération d'intérêt national de Massy Palaiseau Saclay Versailles Saint-Quentin-en-Yvelines is established in 2006. Larger than the campus, it provides for the creation of a science and technology cluster on the Saclay plateau. It is supported by "Grand Paris" project which also provides that the campus is accessible by the future line 18 of the Paris Metro.
- In 2010, the "plan campus" permits an investment of 850 million euros.
- With the debt, a billion is invested. Saclay campus is one of the winners of the « initiatives d'excellence » project so was awarded another grant of 950 million of euros. 30 October 2012, Jean-Marc Ayrault confirmed for the future operation of the project Campus Paris-Saclay staffing a billion for real estate transactions designed to bring together institutions, 850 million from plan campus and additional billion for investments for the future.

In February 2001, the Versailles Saint-Quentin-en-Yvelines University became a founding member of the scientific cooperation foundation foreshadowing the future campus on the Saclay plateau.

In November 2011, the Mines ParisTech finally withdrew the project.

Three administratives structures have been created for this project:

- The Établissement Public Paris-Saclay, which is now the EPA Paris-Saclay, chaired by Pierre Veltz.
- The Fondation de coopération scientifique Plateau de Saclay is the structure that carries the project. It must unite the various institutions at the university and scientific level. It is successively chaired by Alain Bravo, Paul Vialle (28 April 2009 to his resignation on 30 March 2011) and Dominique Vernay.
- The consortium des établissements du Plateau de Saclay, which brings together 23 institutions.

== Development status ==
=== Under construction ===
The last institutions to move on campus are mainly schools from the Paris-Saclay University, such as:

- AgroParisTech in 2021. Particularly, AgroParisTech and INRAE have a project for the construction of a common building in Palaiseau. It will include all activities INRA Île-de-France unlocated in Jouy-en-Josas or Versailles
- the Paris-Saclay Faculty of Pharmacy in 2022
- and the Departments of Chemistry and Biology of the Paris-Saclay Faculty of Science in 2022.

=== In service on campus ===
Institutions that have already moved on campus, such as:

- part the Paris-Saclay University
  - the École normale supérieure Paris-Saclay (moved in 2020)
  - Centre for nanosciences and nanotechnologies (moved in 2016)
  - Institut d'optique Graduate School (moved in 2007)
  - CentraleSupélec (moved in 2015)
- part of the Polytechnic Institute of Paris
  - ENSTA Paris (moved in 2012)
  - ENSAE Paris (moved in 2017)
  - Télécom Paris (moved in 2019)
  - Télécom SudParis (moved in 2019)

Along with other institutions already located in the cluster, these education institutions are to be merged in Paris-Saclay University, such as:

- part of Paris-Saclay University,
  - the Paris-Saclay Faculty of Science, that placed its university 1st in the world for Mathematics and 9th in the world for Physics (1st in Europe) in the 2020 ARWU ranking. (on campus since 1956)
  - Polytech Paris-Saclay (on campus since 2004)
- part of the Polytechnic Institute of Paris
  - École Polytechnique (on campus since 1976)
  - HEC Paris (on campus since 1964)

This Paris-Saclay University was ranked 14th in the world in the 2020 ARWU ranking. The Polytechnic Institute of Paris, formed around the École Polytechnique, was ranked 61st internationally by the QS World University Rankings 2021, 93rd by the Times Higher Education World University Rankings 2020, and 2nd by the Times Higher Education Small University Rankings.

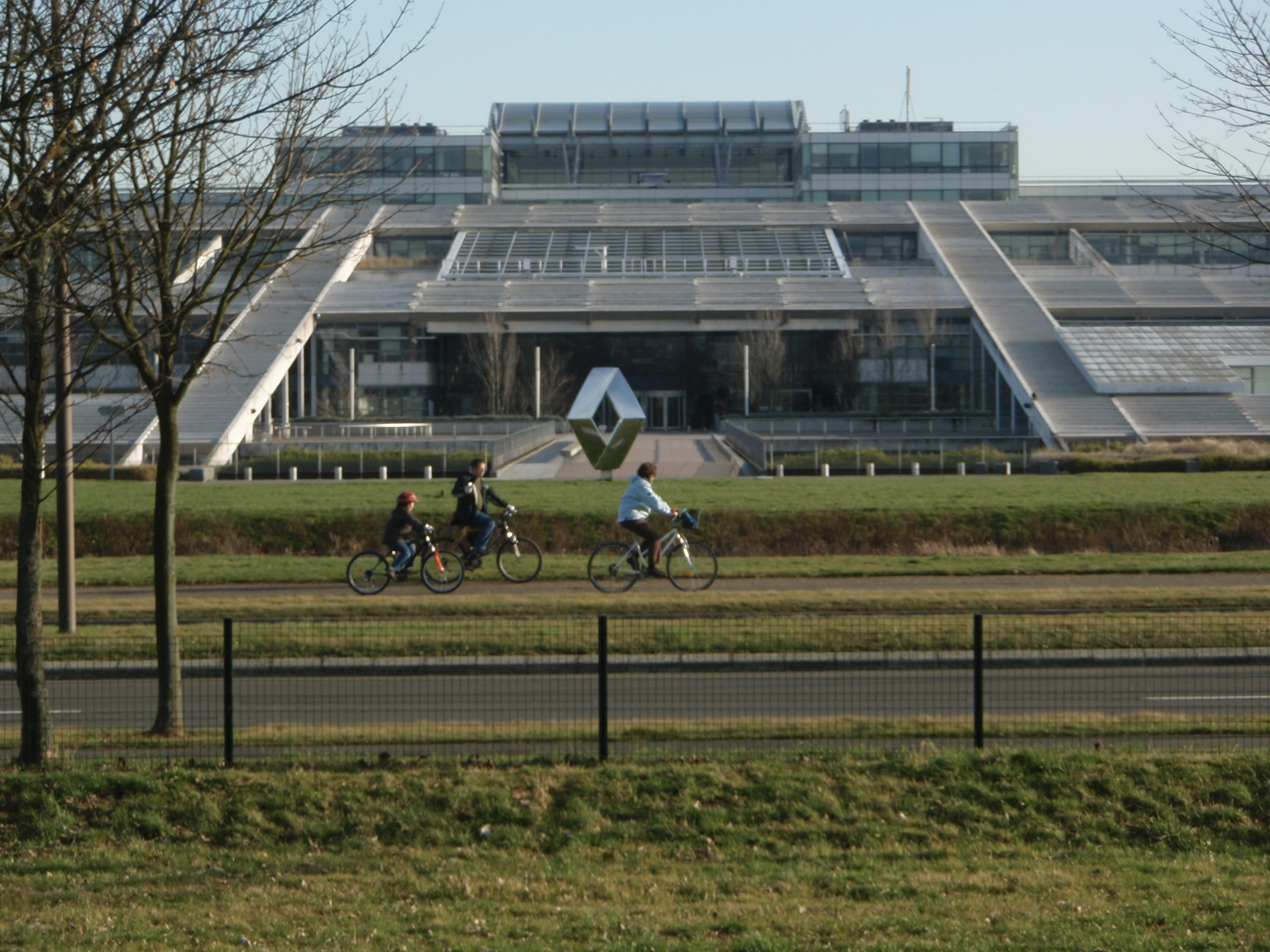
Technocentre Renault, the largest Research and Development centre in France.

== Companies established at Paris-Saclay ==
- ABB
- Agilent Technologies
- Airbus
- Air Liquide
- Alstom
- Altera
- Blizzard Entertainment
- BMW
- Boston Scientific
- Bull
- Capgemini
- Cardinal Health
- Carrefour
- Casio
- Danone
- Dassault Systèmes
- Dentsply
- EDF
- Eni
- Ericsson
- General Electric
- GSK
- Hitachi
- Honeywell
- Horiba
- HP
- Iron Mountain Inc.
- Kraft Foods
- Kyocera
- LFB
- Malakoff Médéric
- Mercedes-Benz
- Mettler-Toledo
- Molex
- Nexter
- Nokia
- Oracle
- PSA Peugeot Citroën
- Reckitt Benckiser
- Renault
- Safran
- Sanofi
- Schindler
- Siemens
- SFR
- Telindus
- Thales
- Thermo Fisher Scientific
- UTC Aerospace Systems
- Valeo
- Volvo

== Town planning ==
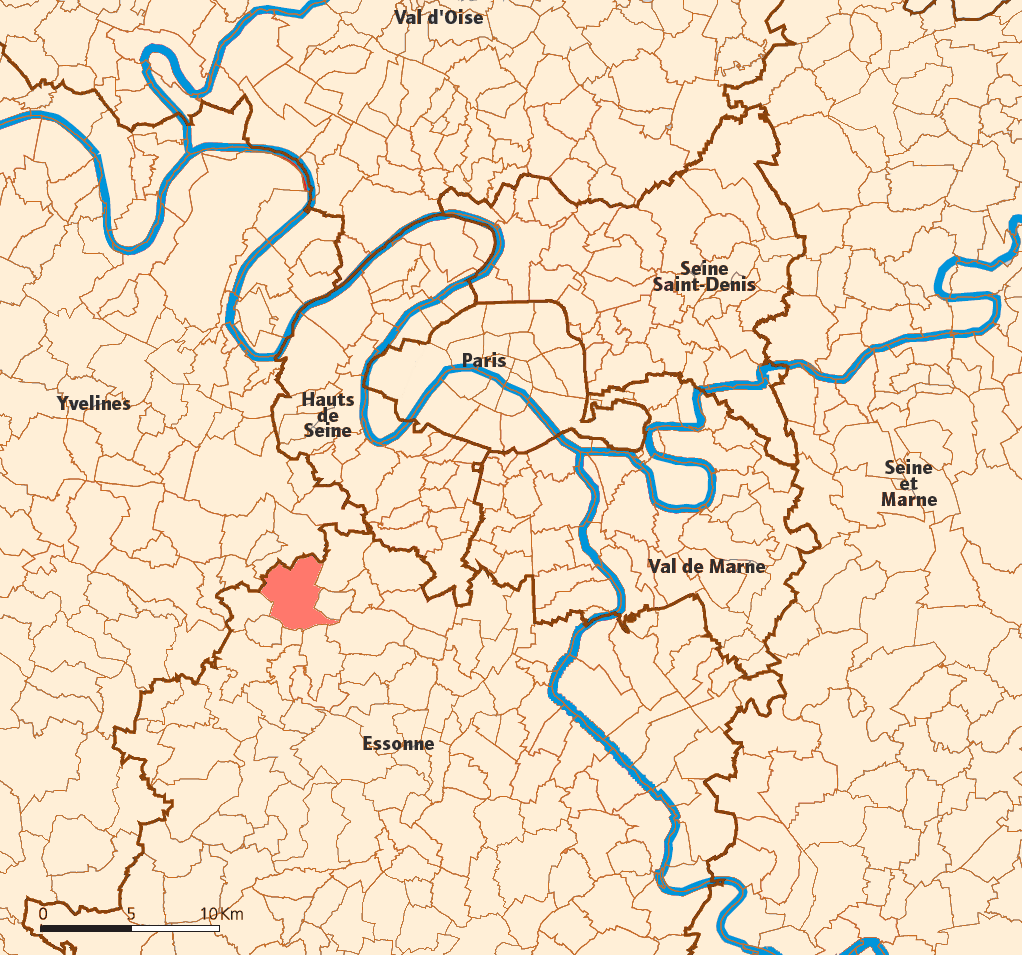
Saclay map

The campus has currently three main areas:

=== Urban campus area ===
==== Quartier de Moulon ====
The area, located in the cities of Orsay and Gif-sur-Yvette, includes the main campus of Paris-Saclay University, which has 15,000 students in the area, with its graduate schools CentraleSupélec and the École normale supérieure Paris-Saclay, its Faculty of Science, its Polytechnic University School and the Paris-Saclay University Institute of Technology. There should then be around 8,100 staff, 5,000 students for engineering schools and 8,000 students only in the university's faculty of science.

The French National Centre for Scientific Research is located at Gif-sur-Yvette since 1946. The area has a dozen research units and service, and also 1,500 people.

It should accommodate several components of the Paris-Saclay University (earth sciences, economics and management, law and sport) as part of the development in the 2010s, but also several facilities pooled projected by the campus operation (conference center, students and international doctoral students accommodation centers, home business, documentation, logistics).

==== Quartier de la Vauve ====
Map of the Palaiseau area

The area, located in the city of Palaiseau, includes the main campus of the Polytechnic Institute of Paris, the second research university of Paris-Saclay, with the École Polytechnique, the ENSTA Paris, the ENSAE Paris, the Telecom Paris and Telecom SudParis.

It also includes the ONERA and the Paris-Saclay University's Institut d'Optique Graduate School and AgroParisTech / INRAE in 2021. The IPSA aerospace College moved to Ivry-sur-Seine in 2009.

==== Other areas ====
===== "Jouy-en-Josas" area =====
HEC Paris, associate member of the Polytechnic Institute of Paris, has been located at Jouy-en-Josas since 1964. INRAE has 1,400 people in the area, and facilities for experimentation on livestock and microbiology. An extension of these activities provided for the arrival of more than 300 people in 2012, with the construction of Biosafety P3 facilities for virology.

===== "Orme/Saclay" area =====
It includes the CEA's Saclay Nuclear Research Centre, member of Paris-Saclay University, the Orphée reactor and SOLEIL in Saint-Aubin.

===== "Nozay" area =====
It includes Nokia in France (former Alcatel-Lucent), in Nozay.

=== Versailles Satory area ===
The Satory site is located in the immediate vicinity of the Palace of Versailles, in the historic heart of the city. At the hinge between the Bièvre valley and Saint-Quentin-en-Yvelines, it is divided into two parts. The western part includes Army establishments and companies linked to the defence sector, such as Nexter Systems and Renault Trucks Defense. It also brings together several players in the field of mobility, with the presence of IFSTTAR, a public transport research organisation, the Citroën Racing motor sports team and the Val d'Or circuit, which also includes test tracks. The eastern part is home to logistics and training units of the Gendarmerie Nationale and the French Army, as well as 5,000 housing units for staff and their families.

=== Saint-Quentin-en-Yvelines area ===
As part of the Paris-Saclay project, the EPA Paris-Saclay is being asked to support development operations undertaken by the Yvelines departement and Saint-Quentin-en-Yvelines. The rail corridor, which separates the latter in two, constitutes a reserve of space available for construction.

The ESTACA Paris-Saclay institution moved to Saint-Quentin-en-Yvelines in 2015.

== Projects critics ==
Various extensions of the campus were criticized by environmental movements in the early 1990s who accuse it of reducing the size of the agricultural areas. These criticisms are reformulated in the expansion projects of the 2000s.

Some also criticize a project that promotes the Grandes Ecoles too much, especially with regard to the governance of the Campus. The Snesup (Syndicat national de l'enseignement supérieur) denounces "a project based on an elitist vision of higher education" and the exclusion of many institutions from the board of directors. The management project initiated by the "campus plan" has also been criticized by local politicians who criticize the state for being the sole leader of the project, or other project stakeholders who criticize the state of exercising too much intervention.

The organization referred to as a business cluster is also criticized by the actors who doubt its effectiveness or fear that its development would be detrimental to other geographical areas, as in the case of the University of Paris-Sud and the École normale supérieure Paris-Saclay leaving towns in the Paris region, or in the case of grandes écoles leaving Paris.

== See also ==
- Paris-Saclay University
- Polytechnic Institute of Paris
- Plateau de Saclay
- Business cluster
- Research-intensive cluster
- Research park
- Science park
- List of technology centers

== Bibliography ==
- Plan Campus du plateau de Saclay, Tome 1, Paris, March 2009, 65 p.
- Plan Campus du plateau de Saclay, Tome 2, Paris, March 2009, 115 p.
