= Telecom Business School =

French business school

Institut Mines-Télécom Business School
- Institut Mines-Télécom Business School
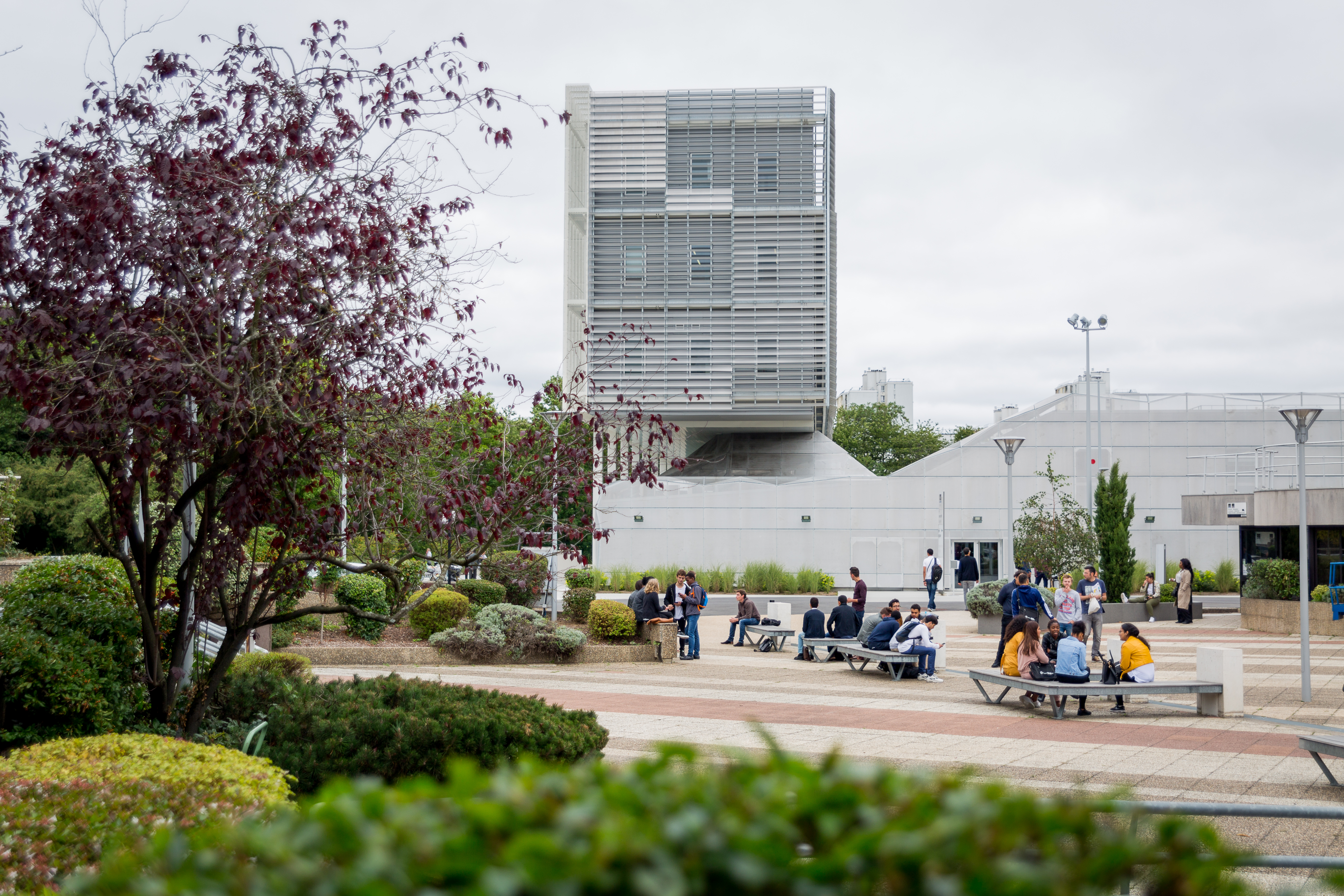
- Former names: Telecom Business School (2009-2018); Institut National de Télécommunications (1979-2008)
- Motto: Uniting skills
- Type: Grande école de commerce et de management (public research university Business school); Grands établissements
- Established: 1979; 47 years ago
- Parent institution: Institut Mines Télécom (IMT)
- Accreditation: Double accreditation: AACSB; AMBA;
- Academic affiliations: Conférence des grandes écoles Télécom & Management SudParis; Institut Mines-Telecom
- President: Denis Guibard (2014-2023), Herbert Casteran (2023-)
- Academic staff: 70
- Administrative staff: 100
- Students: 1,500
- Location: Évry-Courcouronnes, Essonne, France; 48.625°N 2.443°E
- Campus: Suburban 15 acre campus
- Language: English-only & French-only instruction; some Spanish
- Colors: Purple, blue
- Website: https://www.imt-bs.eu/
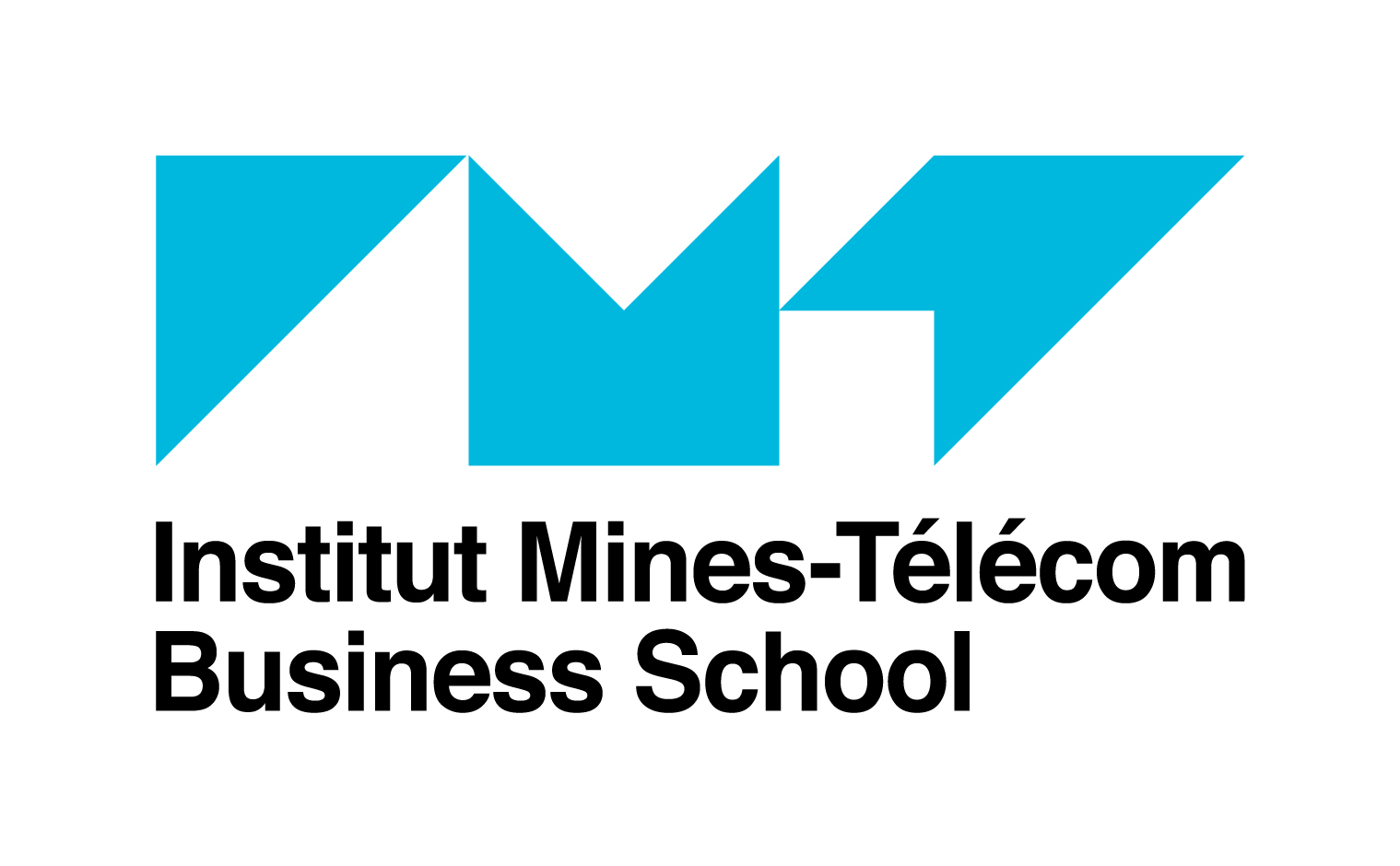

Institut Mines-Télécom Business School (formerly known as INT Management from its foundation in 1979 to its rebranding in 2009 then Telecom Business School from 2009 to 2018) is a French state-funded Management School, a member of Institut Mines-Télécom, the biggest group of engineering and management graduate schools in France. It is also a member of the Management School Chapter of the Conférence des Grandes Écoles, of EFMD (European Foundation for Management Development), AACSB (Association to Advance Collegiate Schools of Business) and accredited by the Association of MBAs for its Masters in Management Program.

The business school was initially founded as the corporate university of Orange Group, the first telecom operator in France and formerly a public company. It is now fully independent from Orange though many partnerships remain in research, training and other different programmes.

The school offers programmes taught in French or English, from bachelor level to PhD. Its main programme is the Masters in Management programme (aka Programme Grande École). The graduates from this programme are highly reputed among recruiters in France and abroad for their ability to work with engineers. It was ranked 75th (2019) by the Financial Times.

== Grande École System ==
Institut Mines-Télécom Business School is a Grande école, a French institution of higher education that is separate from, but parallel and connected to the main framework of the French public university system. Similar to the Ivy League in the United States, Oxbridge in the UK, and C9 League in China, Grandes Écoles are elite academic institutions that admit students through an extremely competitive process. Alums go on to occupy elite positions within government, administration, and corporate firms in France.

Although they are more expensive than public universities in France, Grandes Écoles typically have much smaller class sizes and student bodies, and many of its programs are taught in English. International internships, study abroad opportunities, and close ties with government and the corporate world are a hallmark of the Grandes Écoles. Many of the top-ranked business schools in Europe are members of the Conférence des Grandes Écoles (CGE), as is Institut Mines-Télécom Business School, and out of the 250 business schools in France, only 39 are CGE members.

Degrees from Institut Mines-Télécom Business School are accredited by the Conférence des Grandes Écoles and awarded by the Ministry of National Education (France) (French: Le Ministère de L'éducation Nationale). Institut Mines-Télécom Business School is further accredited by the elite international business school accrediting organizations and it holds double accreditation: The Association to Advance Collegiate Schools of Business (AACSB) and Association of MBAs (AMBA) In 2022, the Financial Times ranked its Masters in Management program 52nd in the world.

== Research ==
The main research lab from Institut Mines-Télécom Business School is the LITEM, which is common with University of Paris-Saclay. Many research programmes are developed in cooperation with other schools from IMT.

IMT Business School's research focuses on digital innovation and transformation, artificial intelligence and ethics in the digital era. The school has several research chairs such as the Chair Values and Policies of Personal Information (Chair VPIP) and Smart Objects and Social Networks Chair. It is also a founding member of DATAIA (Institute for Data Science, Artificial Intelligence and Humanity), created in common with researchers from the University of Paris Saclay, INRIA, CentraleSupélec, CEA, CNRS, École Polytechnique, HEC Paris and Université d'Évry - Val d'Essonne.

In 2018, the doctoral school was hosting 25 PhD students. The head of the doctoral school is Jean-Luc Moriceau. The faculty dean is Imed Boughzala, and the Director of Research Grazia Cecere.

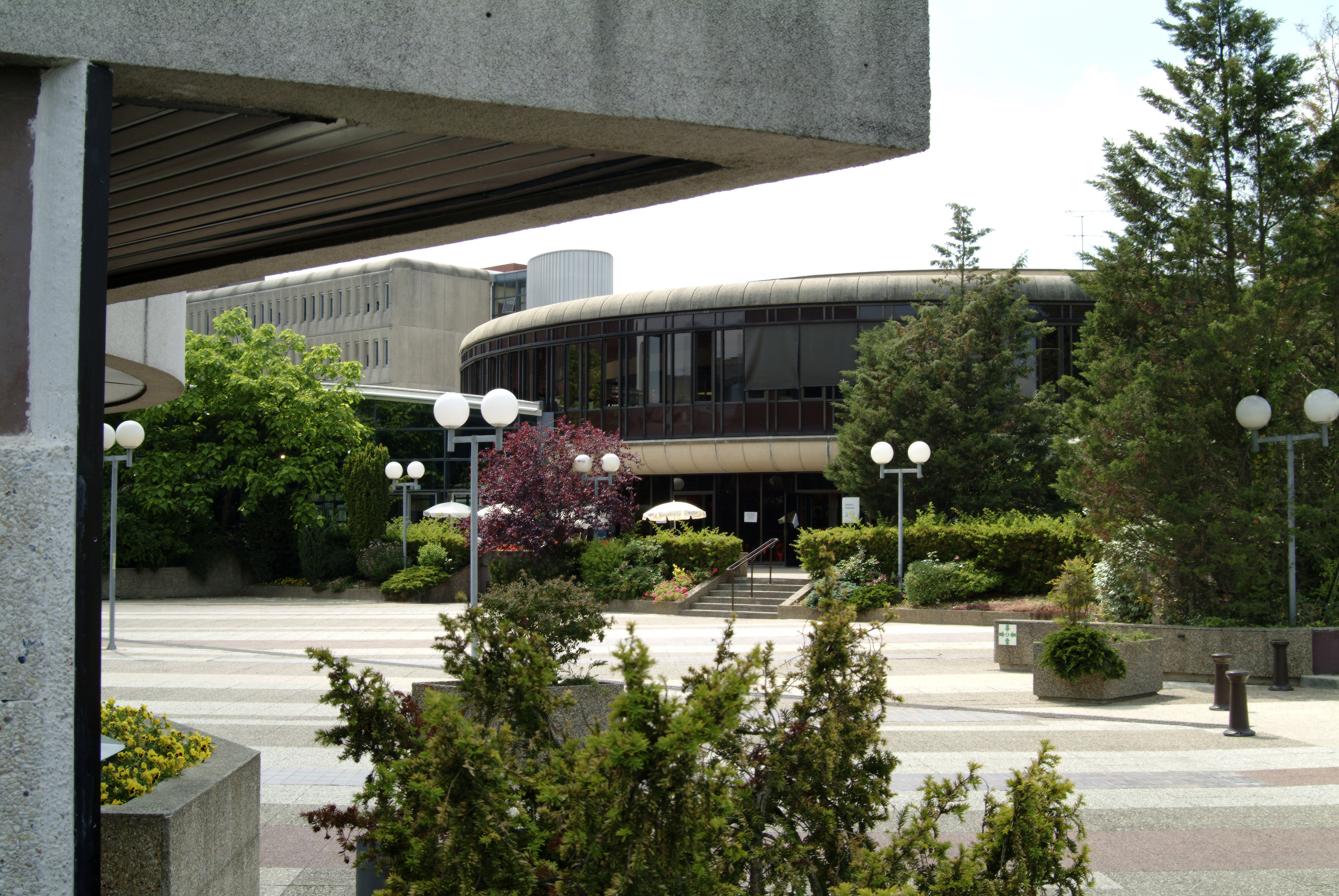
Institut Mines-Télécom Business School and Télécom SudParis campus in Évry

== Campus ==
Together with Télécom SudParis, IMT Business School share the IMT campus in Évry. Almost all students are accommodated on campus.

Students from Télécom SudParis and IMT Business School share most of the student life aspects during their life on campus: shared apartments, shared student associations, shared classes and pedagogical programmes such as the famous Challenge Projets d'Entreprendre, a one-week competition which has, since its first edition in 2000, inspired many other business schools to build their own "startup creation challenges" programmes.
