= Polytechnic Institute of Paris =

French research university of engineering schools in Palaiseau

- Institut polytechnique de Paris
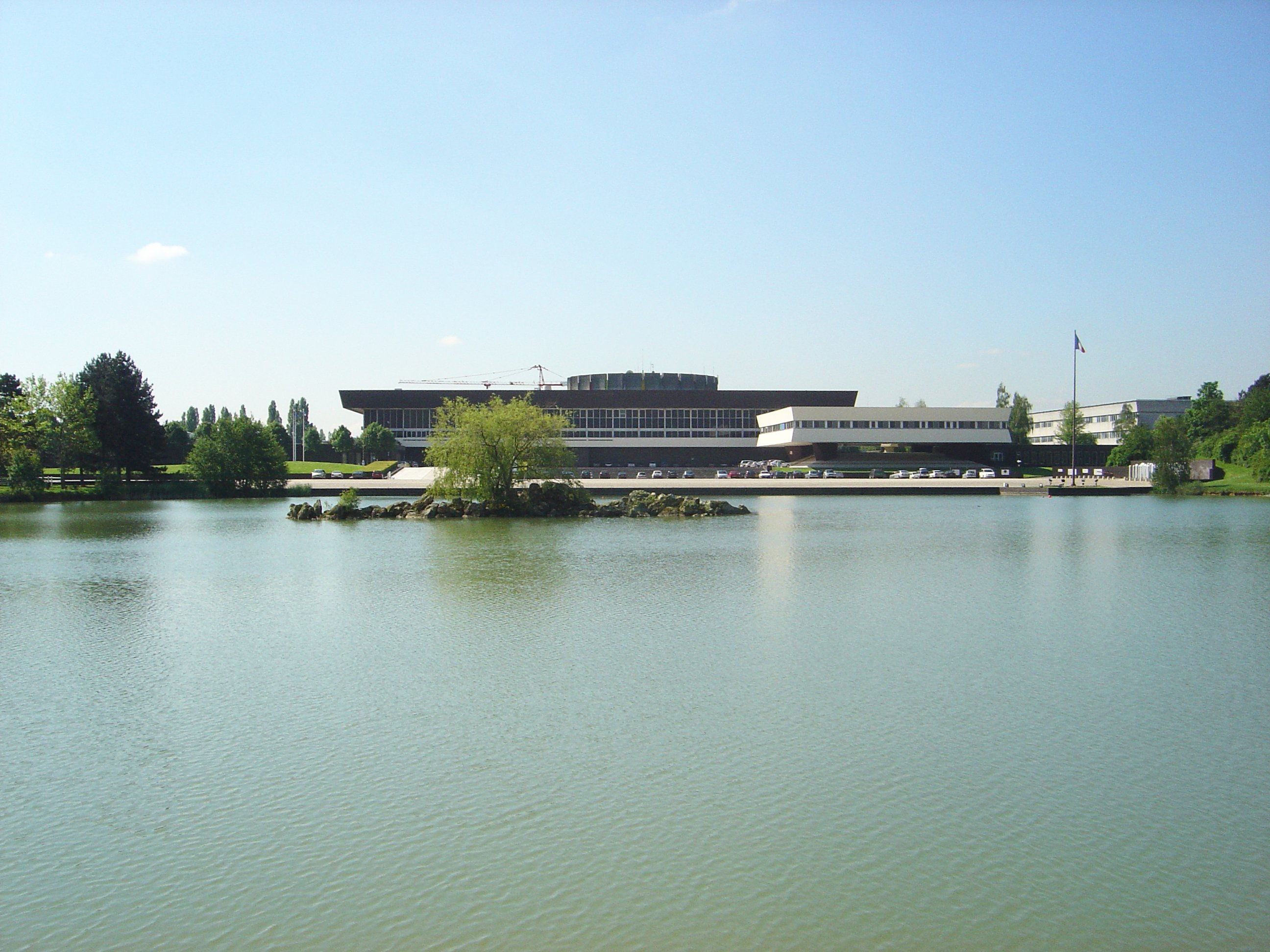
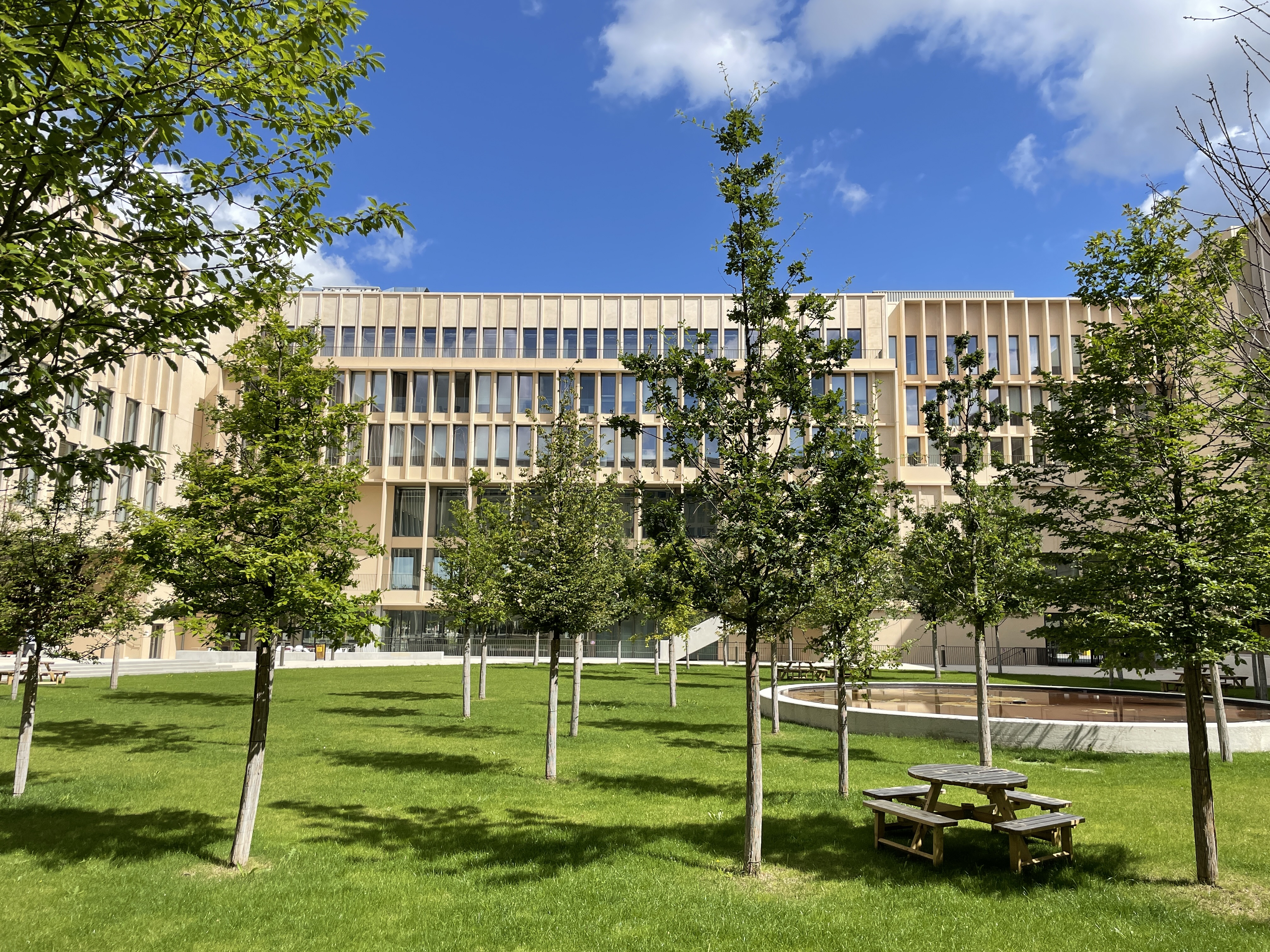
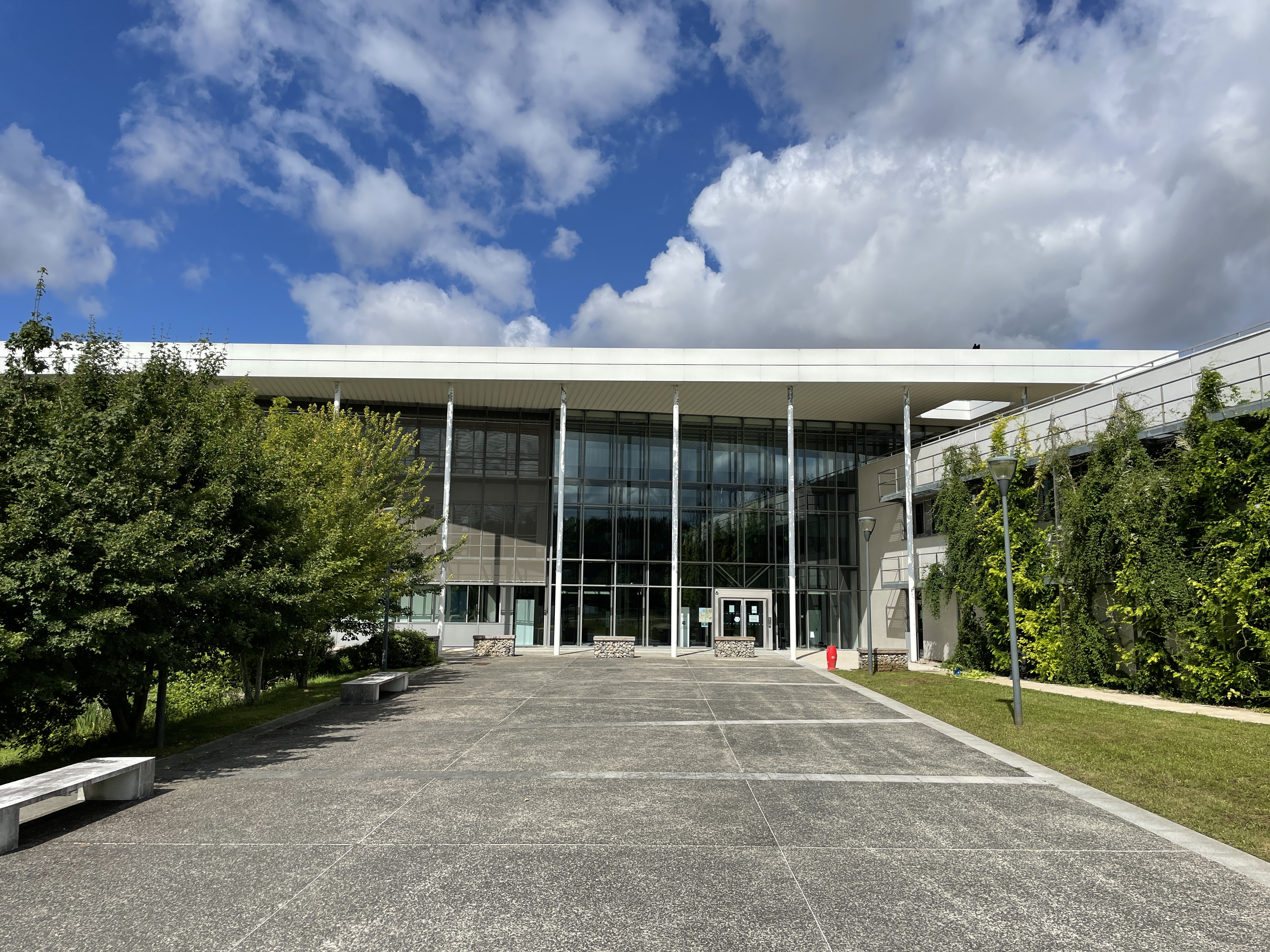
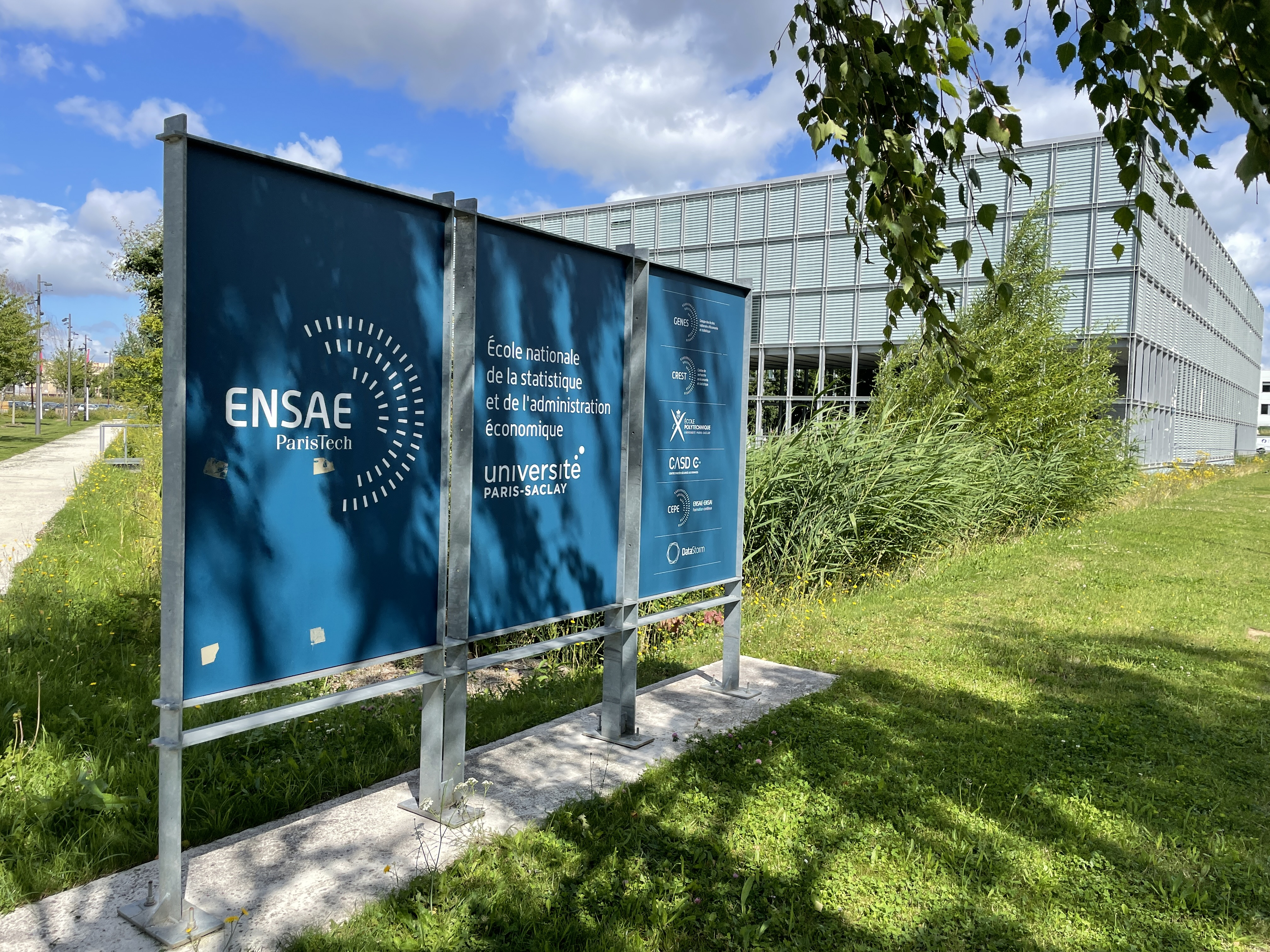
- Type: Public research university
- Established: 1741 ENSTA Paris; 2019 Scission from Paris-Saclay University
- Chancellor: Christophe Kerrero
- President: Thierry Coulhon
- Faculty: 2,100 (2025)
- Students: 10,000 (2025)
- Postgraduates: 1,500 (2025)
- Doctoral students: 2,100 (2025)
- Location: Palaiseau, Île-de-France, France; 48.7117343°N 2.1712888°E
- Campus: Paris-Saclay
- Website: ip-paris.fr/en

The Polytechnic Institute of Paris (French: Institut polytechnique de Paris, pronounced [ɛ̃stity pɔlitɛknik də paʁi]) is a public technological university located in Palaiseau, France. It consists of six engineering grandes écoles: École polytechnique, ENSTA Paris, ENSAE Paris, École nationale des ponts et chaussées, Télécom Paris and Télécom SudParis.

With the Paris-Saclay University, the Polytechnic Institute of Paris is part of the Paris-Saclay project, which is a research-intensive academic campus and business cluster being developed on the Plateau de Saclay near Paris. The project integrates several engineering schools and research centers that are part of the world's top research organizations in various fields.

The technological university was formed around the École polytechnique, one of the most respected and selective grandes écoles in France. Among its alumni and teachers are five Nobel Prize winners, two Fields medalists, three presidents of France and many CEOs of French and international companies.

== History ==
After World War II, the rapid growth of nuclear physics and chemistry meant that research needed more and more powerful accelerators, which required large areas. The University of Paris, the École Normale Supérieure and the Collège de France looked for space in the south of Paris near Orsay. The Orsay branch of the University of Paris eventually became an independent university, called Paris-Sud University. In 1976, the École polytechnique joined the region, by moving from central Paris to Palaiseau. Other institutes joined the region in the following decades, most notably ENS Cachan, Télécom Paris, and ENSTA, as part of the Paris-Saclay project, a national effort to regroup research and business activities.

In 2015, these institutes were grouped together as a university community (ComUE) called Paris-Saclay University. The goal was to be recognized as an entity of sufficient size and quality, and to become a top-ranking, research-focused French university. Each member institution would remain independent but share a significant portion of existing and newly invested resources. This follows a model similar to the one adopted by University of Oxford and Cambridge, where each constituent college keeps its independence while being grouped under a 'university'.

Confronted with disagreements between its members (engineering schools versus universities, French Ministry of Defense versus Ministry of Higher Education), the University of Paris-Sud proposed to transform itself into Paris-Saclay University in 2017, with the engineering schools being only associated to the future institution. On October 25, 2017, the French president Emmanuel Macron announced the creation of a second university pole in Paris-Saclay, which would split away from Paris-Saclay University and regroup the engineering schools. This new pole was initially called "NewUni", and became the Polytechnic Institute of Paris in February 2019.

HEC Paris also joined the new university pole without becoming a member. Other higher education or research institutions may join in the future. Paris-Saclay University and the Polytechnic Institute of Paris co-operate in several master's degrees and PhD programs

On September 15, 2020, the Institute co-founded with HEC Paris the artificial intelligence research center Hi! PARIS.

On July 15, 2024, the École des ponts ParisTech joined the Institute.

The 2025 AI Action Summit in Paris was preceded by AI Action Week presentations, launched with IP Paris hosting a conference on "transformations brought by artificial intelligence for science and societies" on February 6 and 7, with support from the Hi! PARIS research center.

== Organisation ==
=== Grandes écoles ===
The Polytechnic Institute of Paris comprises six grandes écoles:

- École polytechnique
- ENSTA Paris
- ENSAE Paris
- École des ponts
- Télécom Paris
- Telecom SudParis

Name	Foundation	Field	Students	Campus
École polytechnique	1794	Science and engineering	2,316	Paris-Saclay, Paris
ENSTA Paris	1741	Science and engineering	897	Paris-Saclay, Brest
ENSAE Paris	1945	Science and engineering	581	Paris-Saclay
École des ponts	1747	Science and engineering	1,971	Champs-sur-Marne
Télécom Paris	1878	Science and engineering	1,360	Paris-Saclay
Télécom SudParis	1979	Science and engineering	822	Évry-Courcouronnes, Paris-Saclay

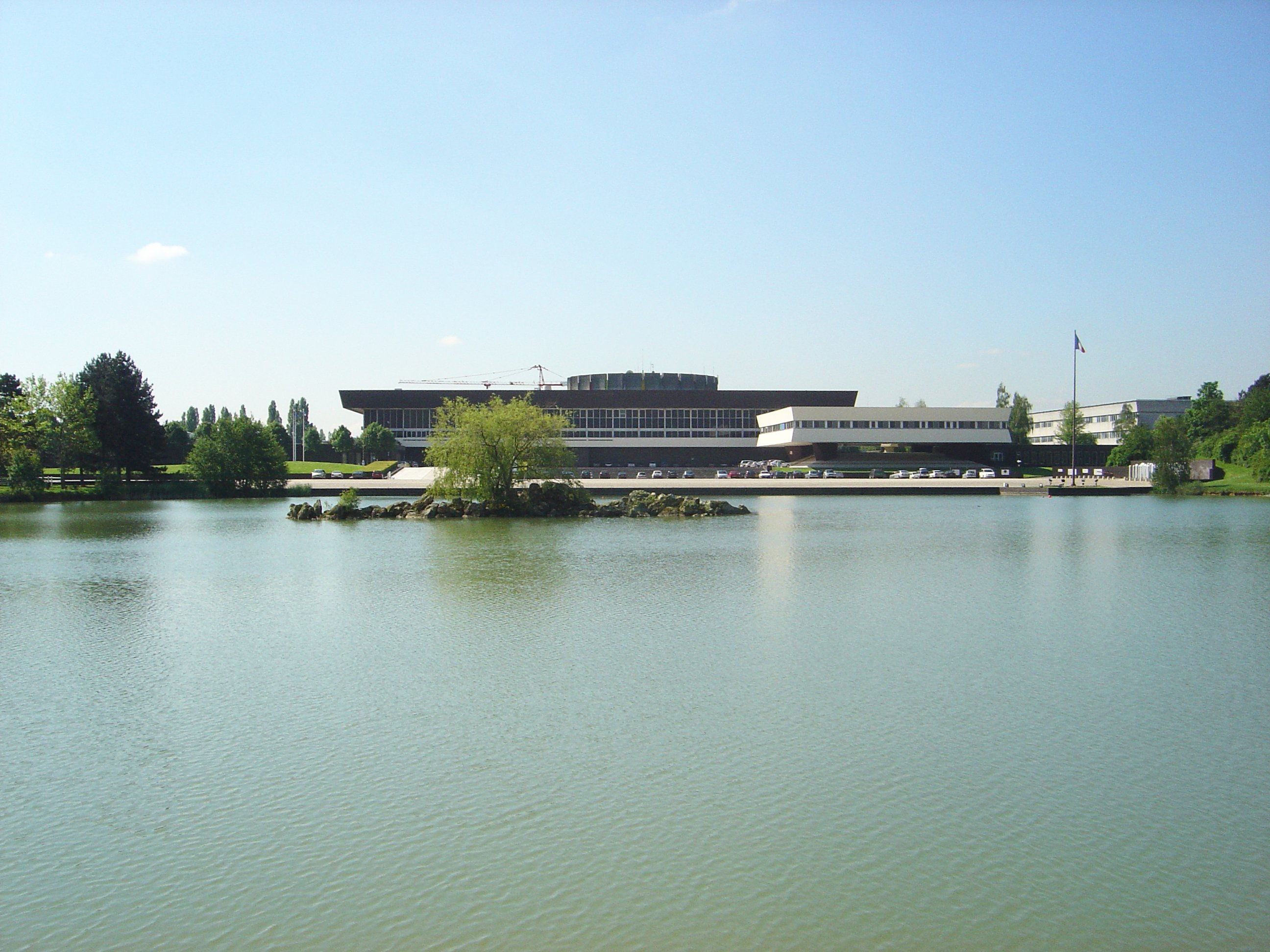
École polytechnique, seen from the lake

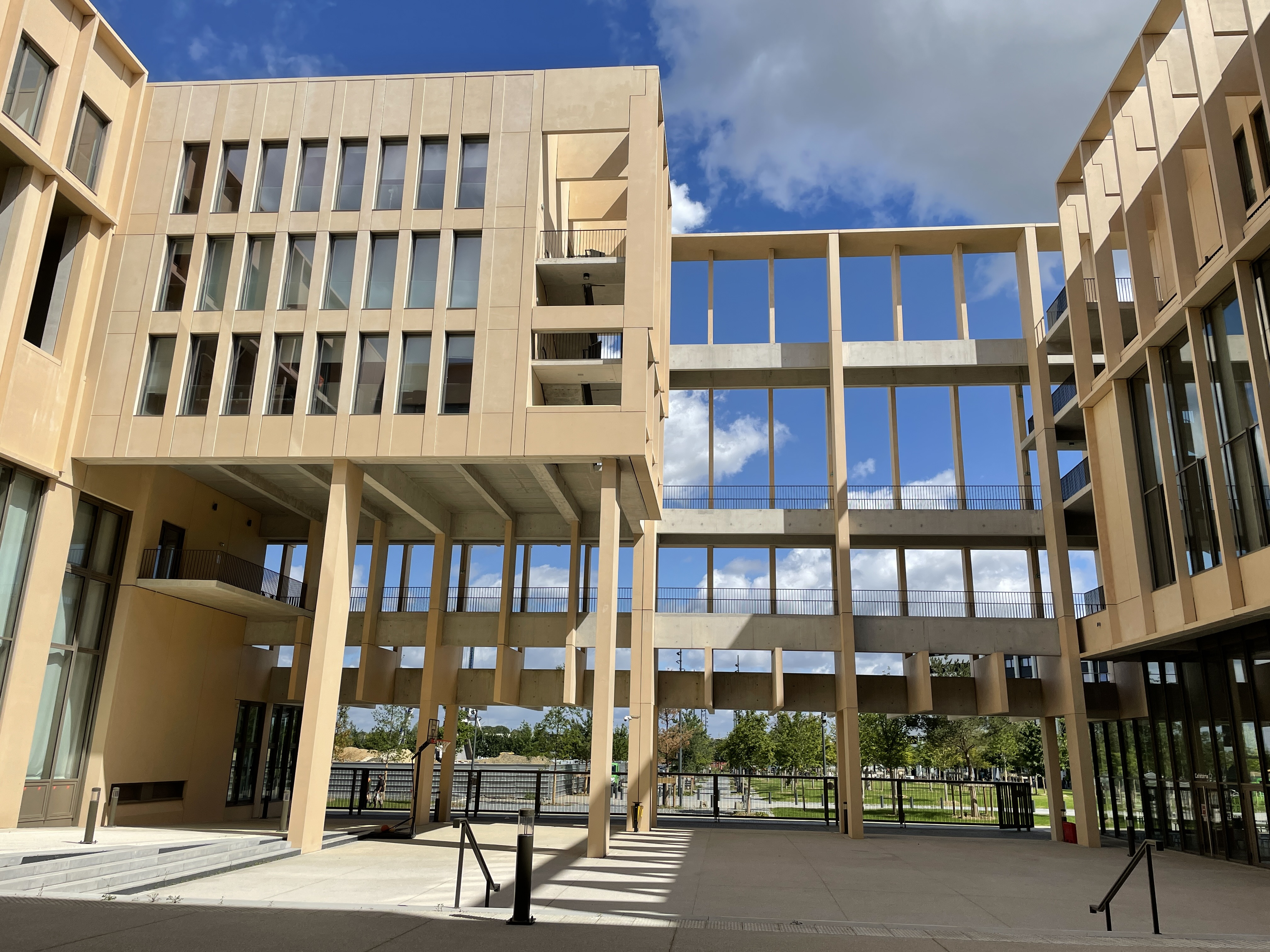
Side court of the building of Telecom Paris and Telecom SudParis

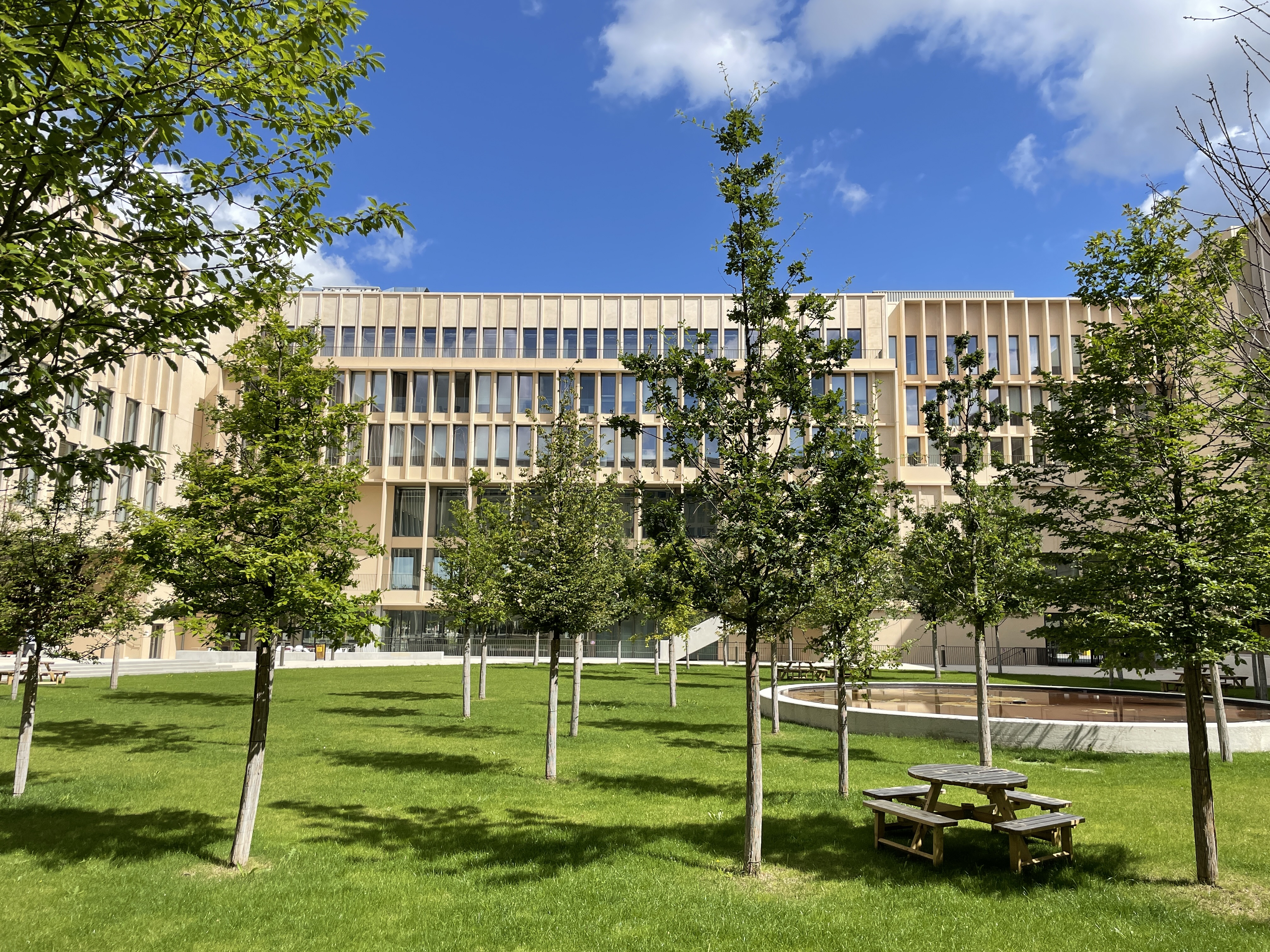
Main court of the building of Telecom Paris and Telecom SudParis

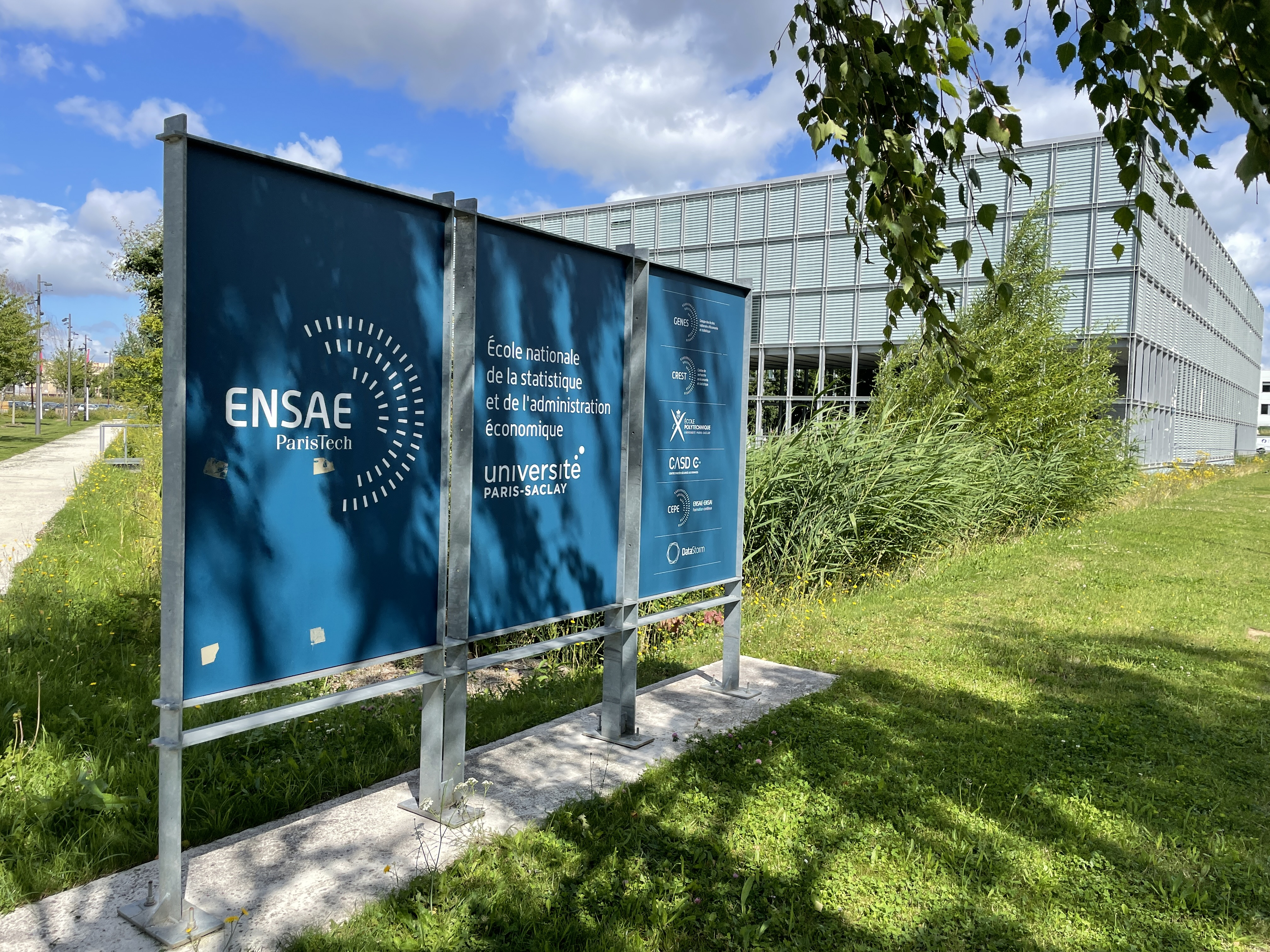
ENSAE Paris

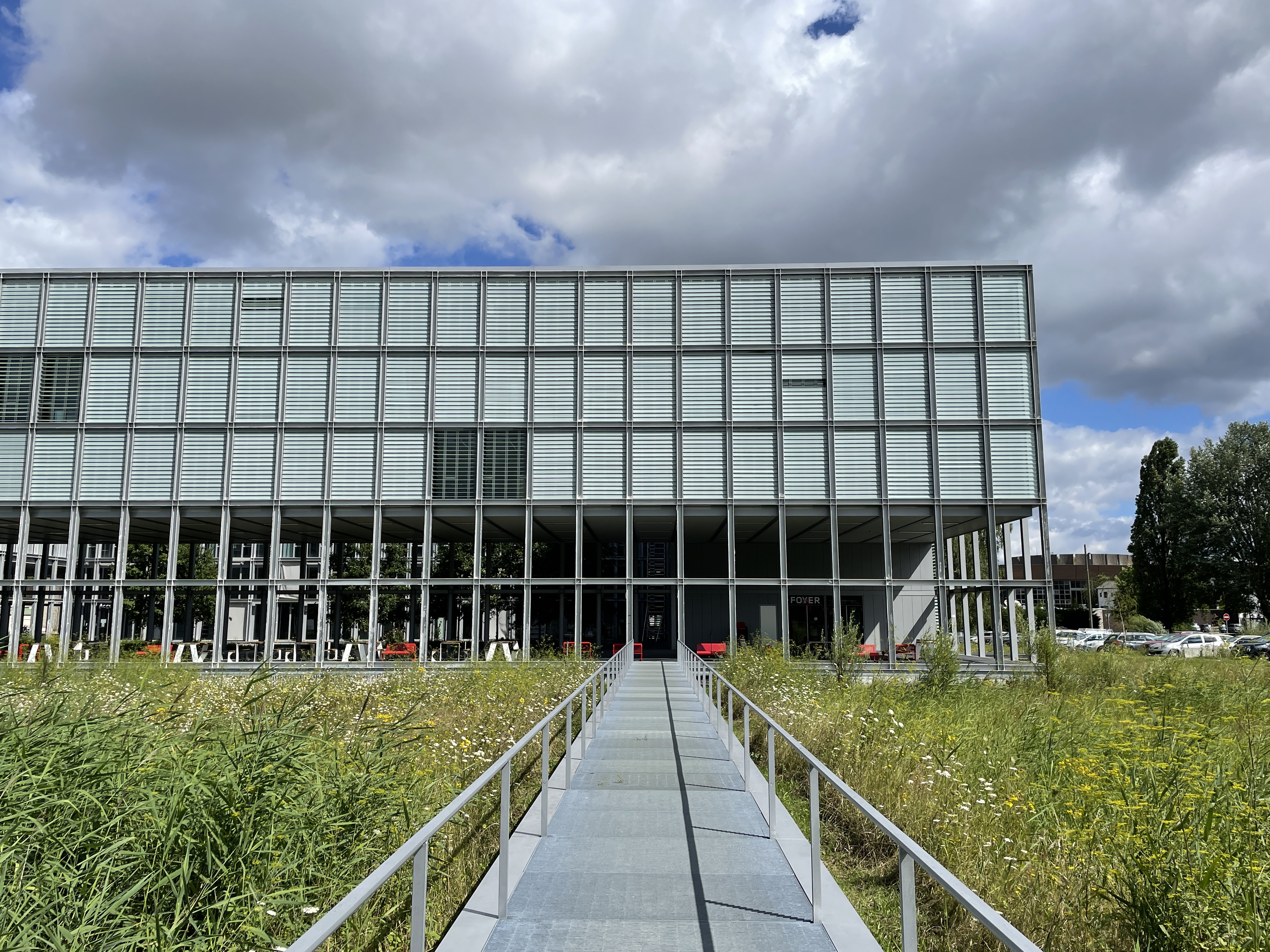
ENSAE Paris seen from the South

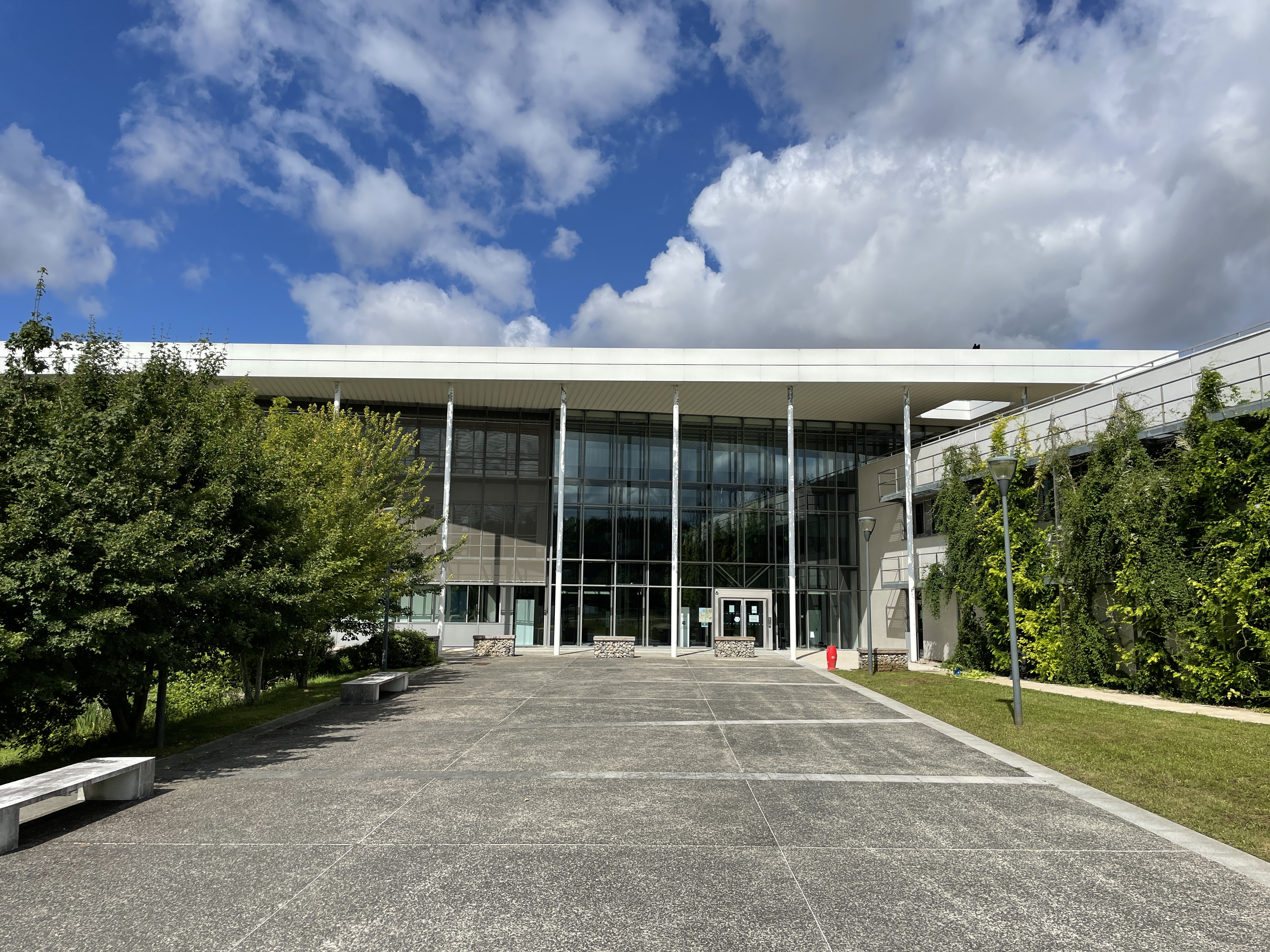
ENSTA Paris

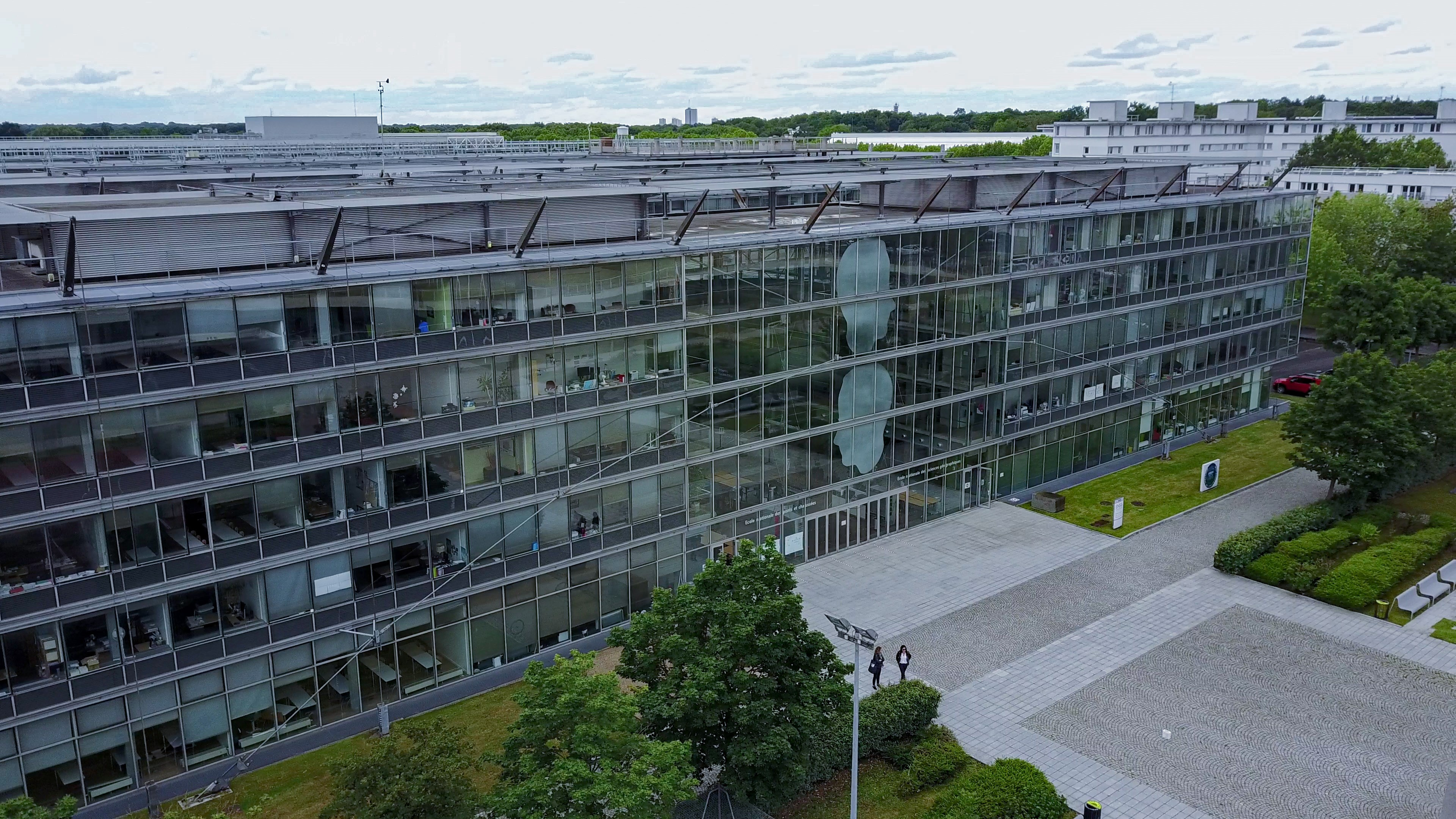
École des ponts

=== Research organizations ===
The following research organizations have established research centers within the Polytechnic Institute of Paris. The resources contributed by these organizations will remain largely independent from other member institutions.

- CEA (Atomic Energy and Alternative Energies Commission)
- CESAER (Conference of European Schools for Advanced Engineering Education and Research)
- CNRS (French National Centre for Scientific Research)
- Inria (French Institute for Research in Computer Science and Automation)
- INSERM (French Institute of Health and Medical Research)
- Institut des Hautes Études Scientifiques (Institute of Advanced Scientific Studies)
- INRA (French National Institute for Agricultural Sciences)
- ONERA (National Board of Study and Aerospace Research)
- SOLEIL (National synchrotron facility)
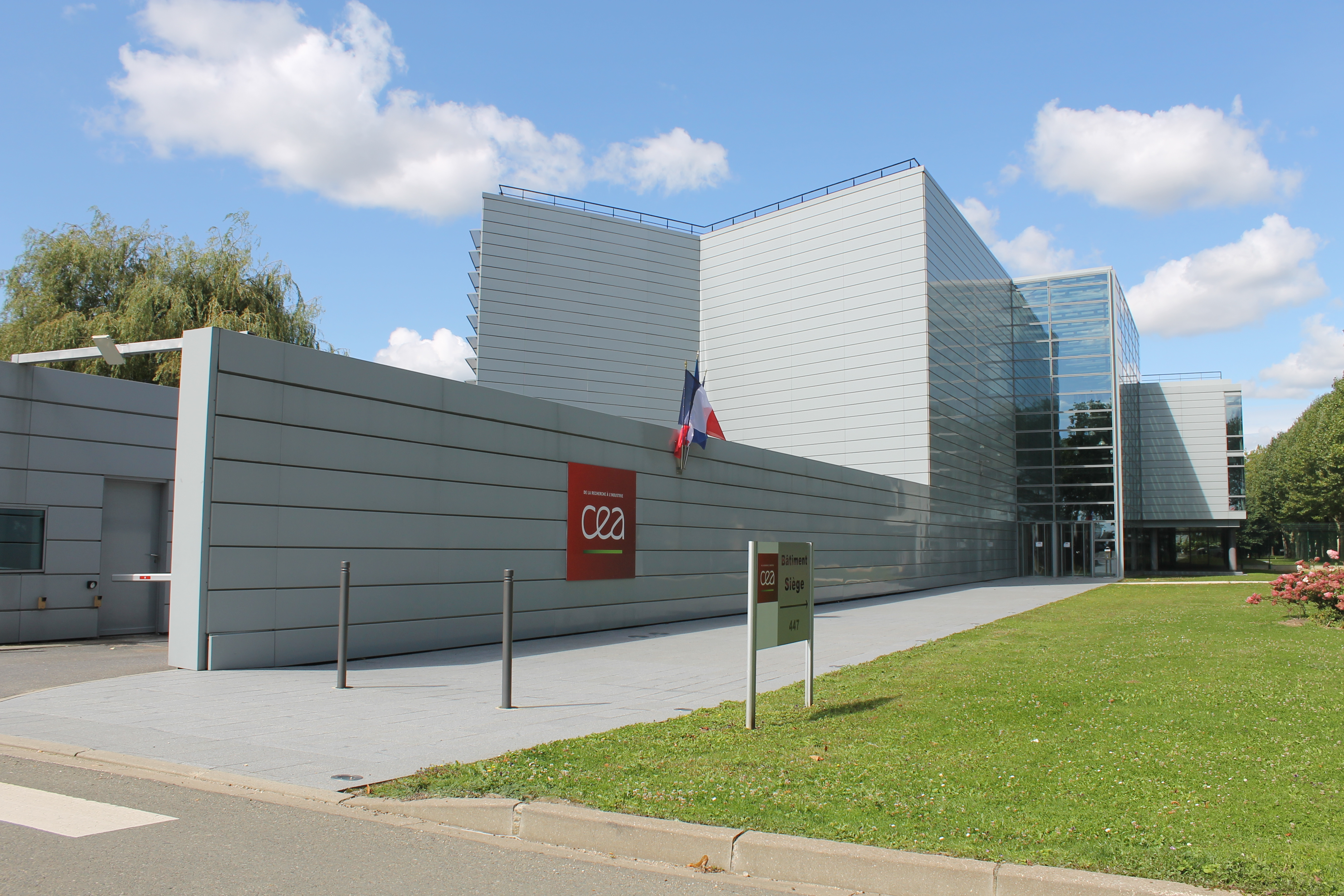
CEA

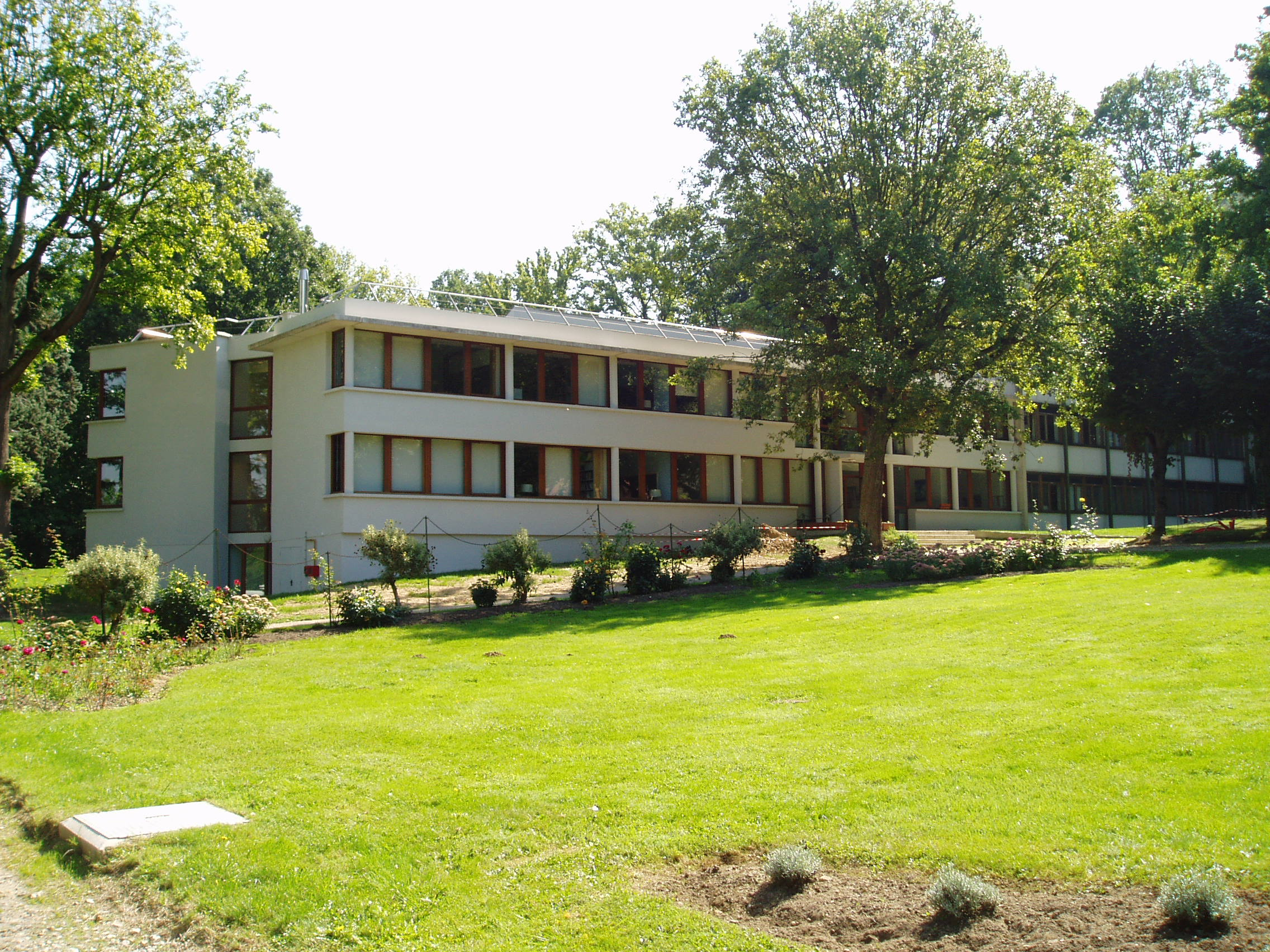
IHES

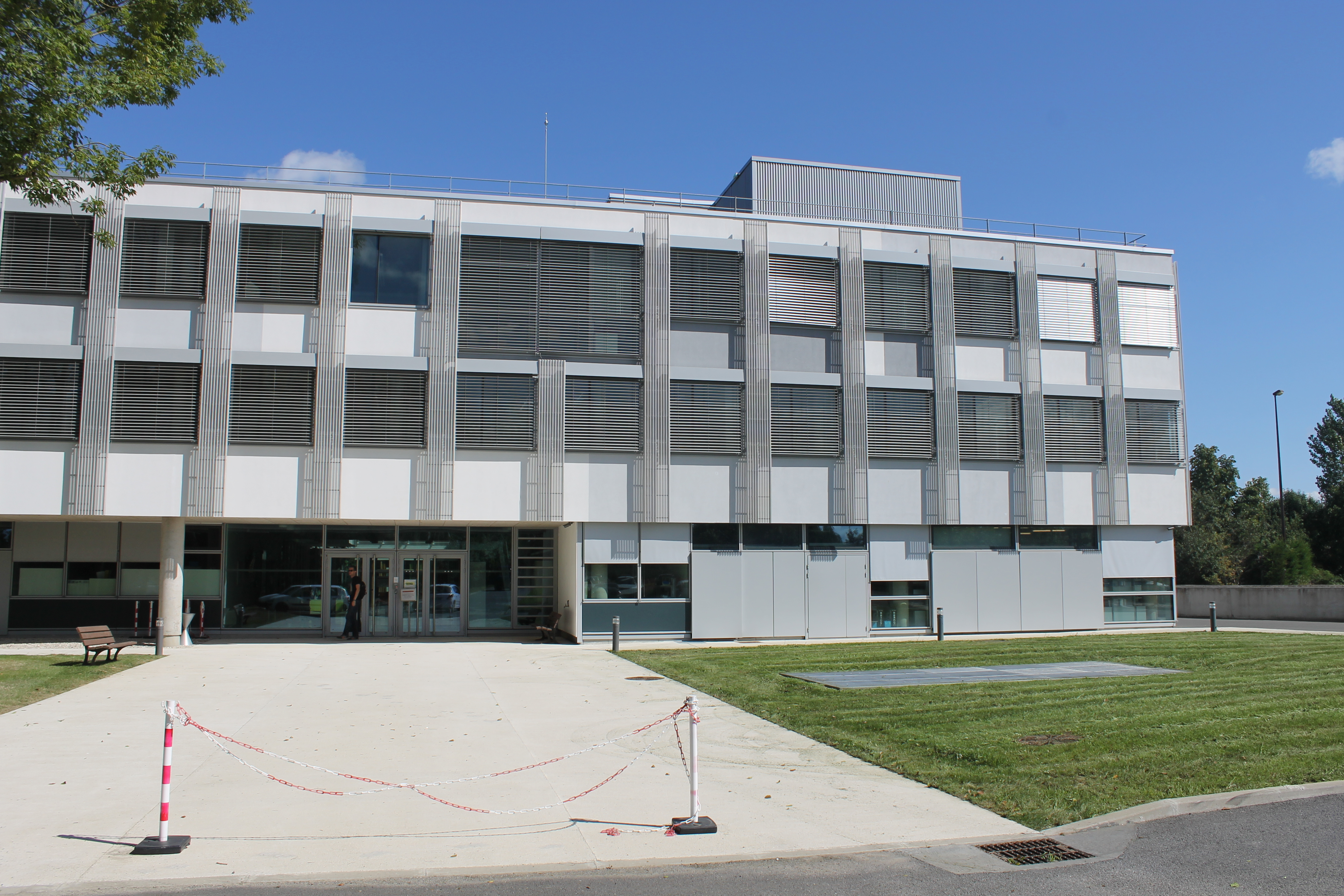
INRIA

== Academic programs ==
=== National degrees ===
The Polytechnic Institute of Paris offers a wide range of programs (PhDs, Master's degrees, etc.) through all its schools, validated by national degrees.

=== CPES Data Science, Society and Health ===
Polytechnic Institute of Paris is one of the three founding institutions of the Cycle pluridisciplinaire d’études supérieures (CPES) in Data Science, Society and Health, a selective three-year undergraduate program created in 2023. The degree is jointly delivered by Paris-Saclay University, Polytechnic Institute of Paris and HEC Paris. Recognized by the French Ministry of Higher Education, it confers the national grade de licence (Bachelor’s level) to its graduates. The curriculum combines mathematics, computer science, statistics, social sciences and public health, and includes interdisciplinary projects taught across the three institutions.

== University rankings ==
University rankings

Global – Overall
- ARWU World: 201-300 (2025)
- CWUR World: 35 (2025)
- QS World: 41 (2026)
- THE World: 68 (2026)

National – Overall
- ARWU National: 9-12 (2025)
- CWUR National: 4 (2025)
- QS National: 2 (2026)
- THE National: 2 (2026)

In international rankings, the Polytechnic Institute of Paris is ranked 41st overall in 2026 and 12th in graduate employability in 2022 by QS World University Rankings. It is ranked 68th by Times Higher Education, 201-300 by the Shanghai Ranking, and 35th in the world by the CWUR Ranking.

== See also ==
- List of public universities in France by academy
- Paris-Saclay Medical School
