= Télécom SudParis =

Engineering school in France

- Télécom SudParis
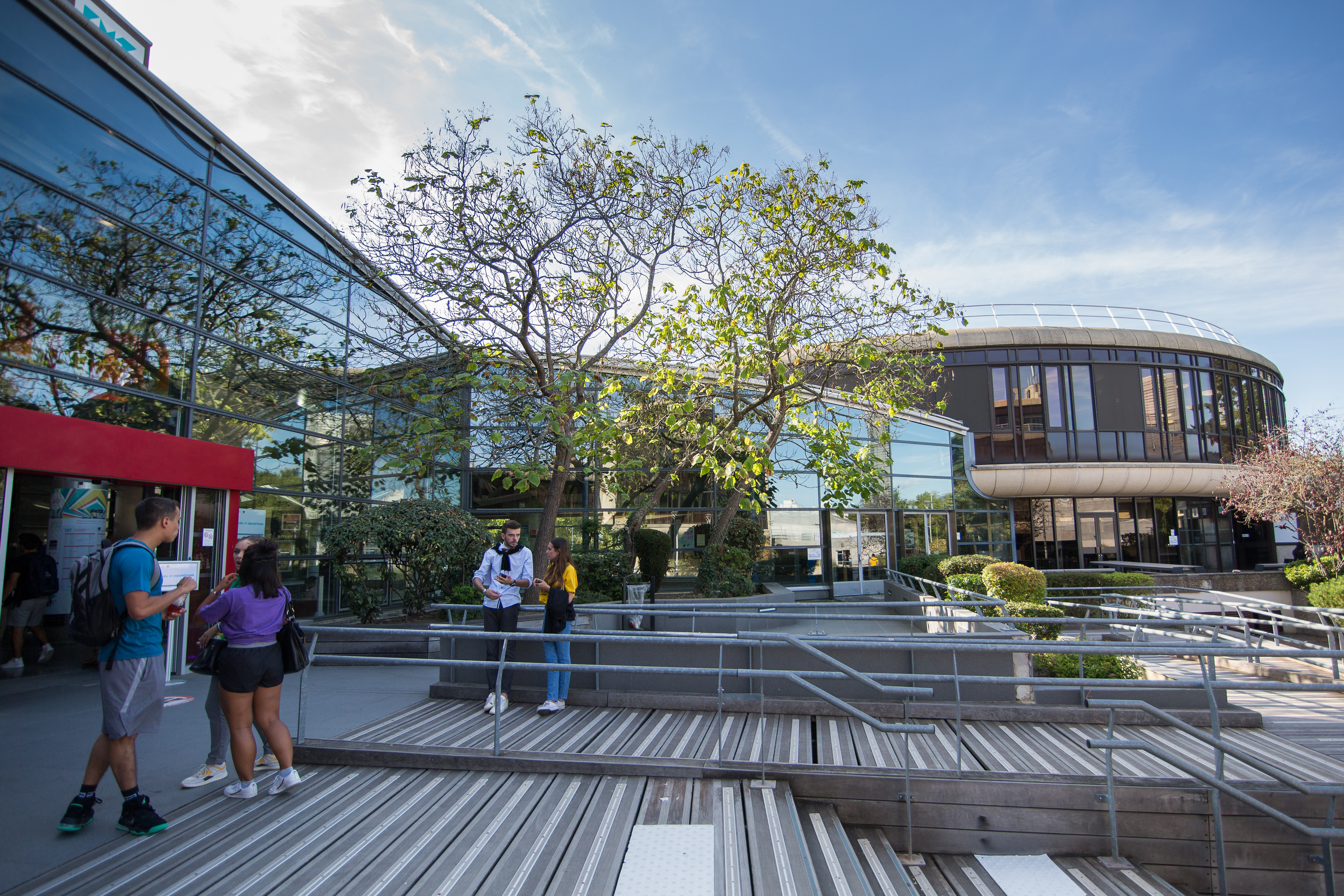
- Télécom SudParis
- Former names: Institut National des Télécommunications (INT), Télécom INT, Télécom & Management SudParis (TMSP)
- Type: Grande école d'ingénieurs (public research university Engineering school)
- Established: 1979
- Parent institution: Institut Mines-Télécom
- Academic affiliations: Conférence des Grandes écoles, Institut polytechnique de Paris
- President: Francois Dellacherie (since 2020)
- Faculty: 97
- Students: 1,068 (2023)
- Location: Evry, France; 48.624011°N 2.443972°E
- Campus: Évry-Courcouronnes, Palaiseau 15 acre campus
- Website: telecom-sudparis.eu

Télécom SudParis (formerly known as INT, i.e. Institut National des Télécommunications) is a French engineering school—a public institution of higher education and research (grande école) that awards engineering degrees in France. It is one of the 200 schools officially accredited by the state to issue this diploma. In 2025, it ranked 27th in the French engineering school ranking by l'Etudiant, and in 2026, 12th in a ranking by Le Figaro.

Télécom SudParis shares its campus with Institut Mines-Telecom Business School (ex INT Management), a Graduate Business School, and has a research centre in the field of Information and Communication Science and Technology.

Télécom SudParis is part of Institut Mines-Télécom and Institut polytechnique de Paris. Télécom SudParis and Institut Mines-Telecom Business School were part of Telecom & Management SudParis (ex INT).

== General Engineers ==
Locations of Institut Telecom schools

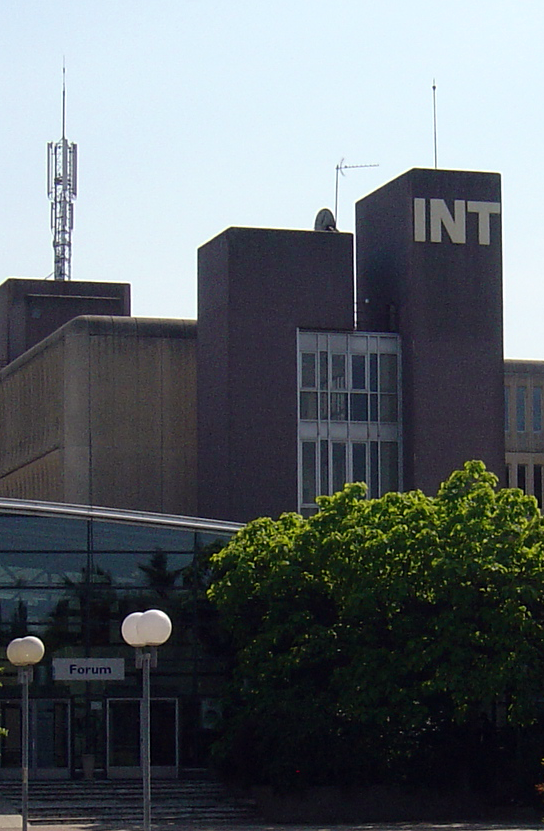
Telecom SudParis buildings

Télécom SudParis trains general engineers with a variety of skills. Over a three year period, they get professional as well as academic experience. During their last year, students are to take a specialization, amongst

=== Admission to engineering programs ===
Foreign students: Dual qualification with partner universities

=== Summer school ===
The European Summer School at Télécom SudParis offers students having completed at least two years of undergraduate studies an opportunity to study different aspects of either management, information technology or intercultural awareness in France.

=== Statistics ===
- 80% of the year’s student intake secured a job before graduating
- 98% of graduates secured a job within 4 months of graduating
- €45,600 gross salary, excluding bonus for new graduates.

== Customized training programs ==
Télécom SudParis’s engineering programs consist of a common-core syllabus along with an advanced studies cycle, with each part lasting three semesters. They include solid business and international experience.

== Research ==
- 180 faculty staff
- 140 PhD students
- Teaching and research departments:
  - Language and Human Science
  - Entrepreneurship, Management, Marketing and Strategy
  - Economics, Finance and Sociology
  - Information Systems
  - Advanced Research and Techniques for Multidimensional Imaging Systems (ARTEMIS)
  - Communications, Images and Information Analysis
  - Electronics and Physics
  - Computer science
  - Networks and Software
  - Networks and Multimedia mobile services
  - Telecommunications Networks

=== Research training ===
In the third year, openings in the field of research are available to students, as well as a range of Master of Science (MSc) and Research Master programs, awarded jointly with partner universities. Doctoral programs offer PhD students a broad spectrum of research themes on the school’s campus.

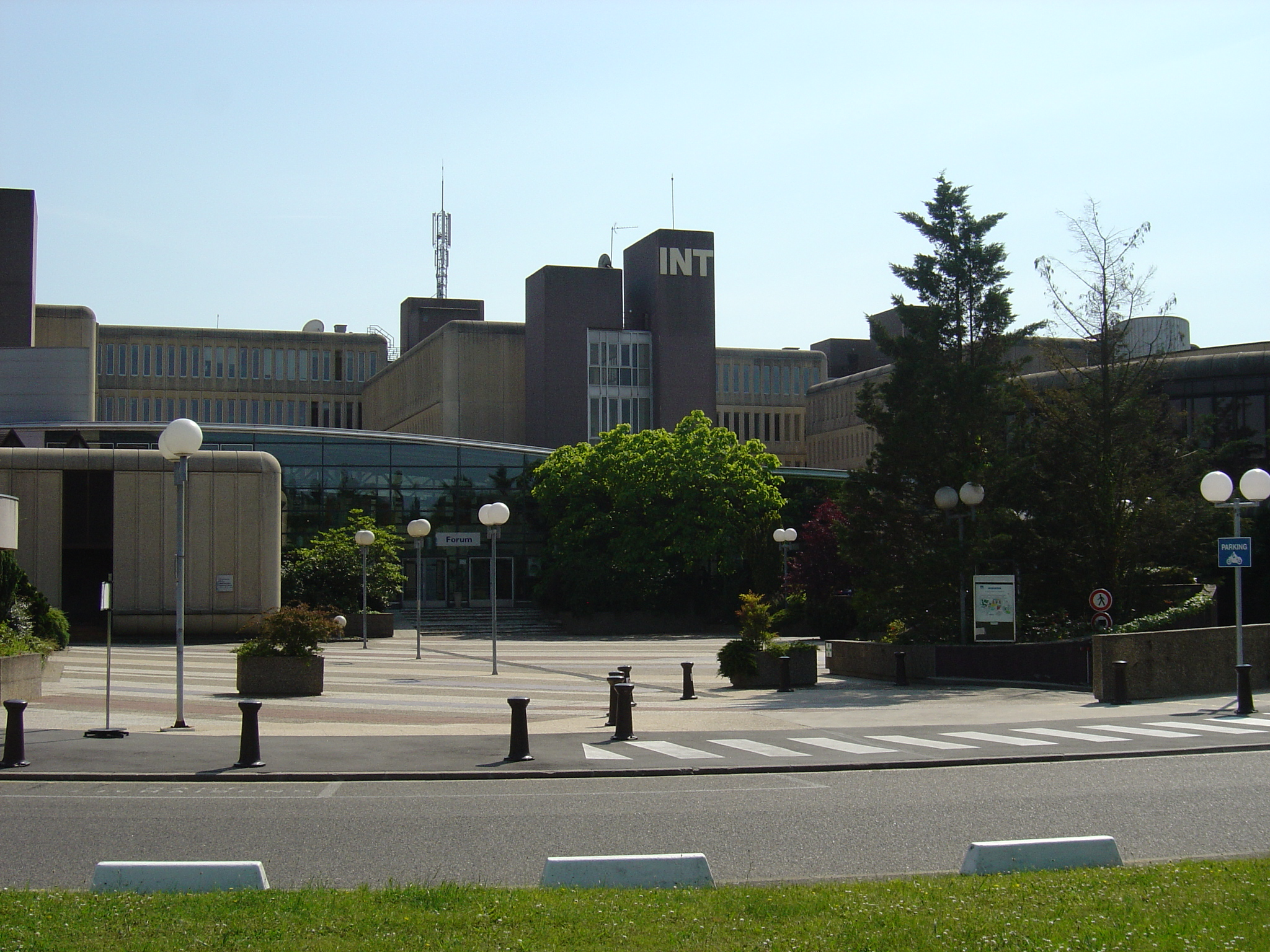
Telecom SudParis main buildings

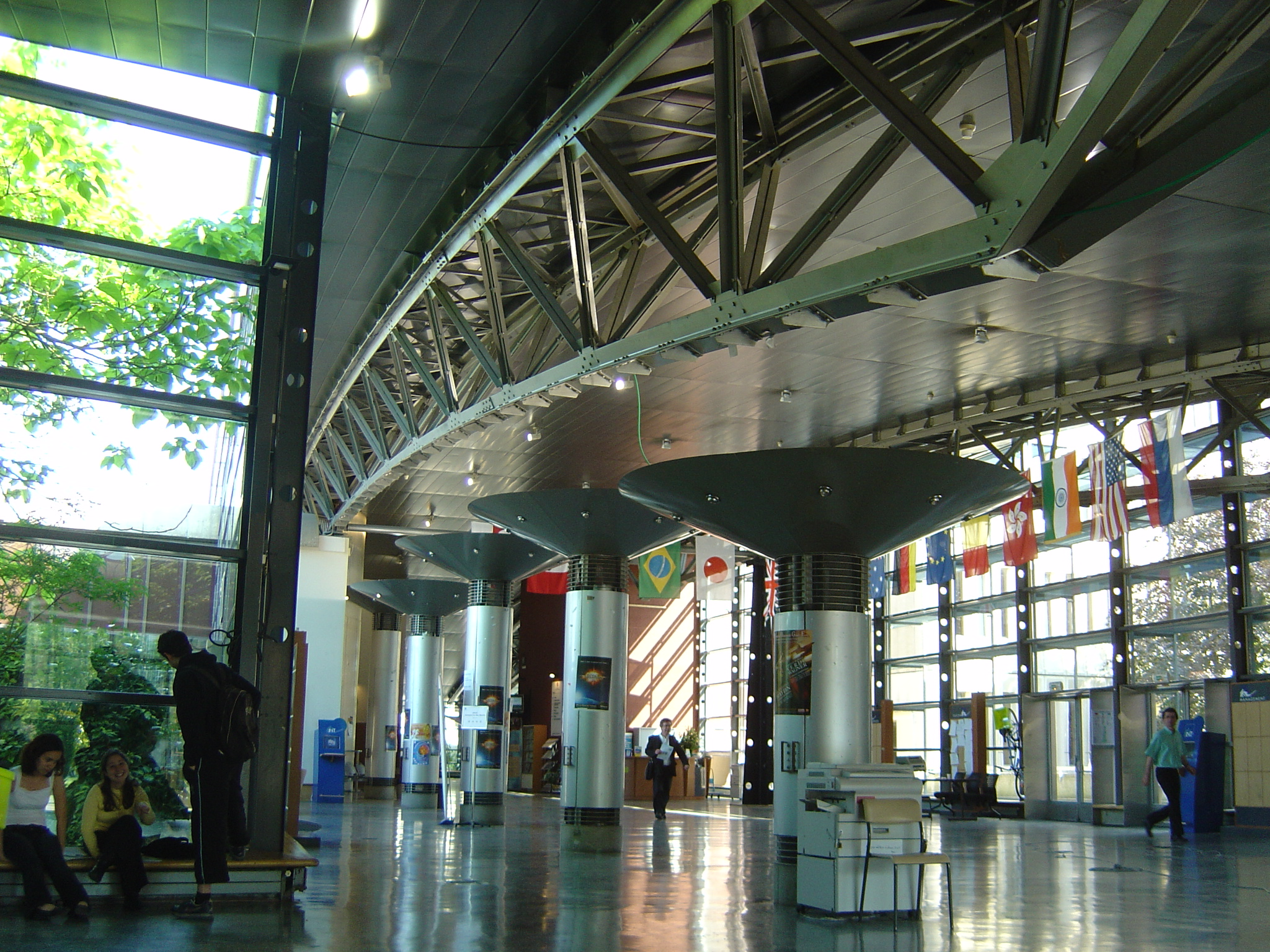
Telecom SudParis Forum

== International environment ==
- 40 partner universities
- 10 dual qualification agreements
- 60 nationalities on campus
- 9 languages taught, including French as a foreign language
- 30% of foreign students

=== Languages ===
In addition to English, which is compulsory, students must choose a second language: German, Spanish, Russian, Italian, Japanese, Arabic, Chinese and French as a foreign language. There is an option to learn a third language.

=== Studying abroad ===
The school has established multiple partnerships with more than forty universities located in 30 countries. A number of options are available: lasting 1 to 3 semesters, to get an introduction to both culture and the country and obtain a dual qualification.

=== Campus ===
32% of professors and almost 400 students are foreign nationals. Altogether more than sixty nationalities are represented on the Telecom & Management SudParis campus, which is shared with the Business School: Telecom Business School. Foreign students are enrolled in graduate programs, doctoral programs, “Mastères Spécialisés” Programs (MS) or Master of Science.

== Rankings ==
National ranking (ranked as Télécom SudParis for its Master of Sciences in Engineering)

Name	Year	Rank
Le Figaro	2023	11

International ranking (ranked as Institut Polytechnique de Paris)

Name	Year	Rank (World)	Rank (France)
CWUR	2022-2023	43	5
QS World University Rankings	2023	48	2
Shanghai Ranking	2022	301-400	13-16
Times Higher Education	2022	91	3

== Business presence ==
Business is a core component of Télécom SudParis’s educational programs: business start-ups, student placements, company visits, etc.

=== Expertise ===
Télécom SudParis offers a broad range of training programs at various levels: engineering training, specialized masters, PhD programs, lifelong learning programs such as BADGE (“Graduate School Aptitude Assessment”), accredited professional qualification programs. Télécom SudParis provides tailored support to companies, depending on their needs and development.

=== Business involvement ===
School life and the professional development of students are supported by corporate relationships: course involvement, sponsorship, career management assistance (T&M Alumni), project supervision or placements, student grants, etc.

=== Entrepreneurship support system ===
Backed by the Essonne Regional Council, Télécom SudParis’s business incubator supports innovative project leaders in the ICT sector wishing to carry out their activities. Led by a team of experts from IMT Starter, its entrepreneurship program is based on a broad range of services and resources: support, project engineering, incubation, information, advice, funding, communication, relational networks, etc.

=== Research development and transfer ===
Research conducted at Télécom SudParis is primarily oriented towards application and industrial innovation, without losing sight of fundamental issues and problems. It is exploratory and pre-competitive in nature and is conducted in close cooperation with the national and international scientific community. Strong ties have been forged with SMEs, often thanks to the involvement of CRITT (Regional Centers for Innovation and Technology Transfer). Télécom SudParis offers businesses expertise in the field of ICT (Information and Communication Technologies) from a scientific and technical point of view and also in terms of management, services or usages

== The campus ==
Télécom SudParis is located in Évry, the main town in Essonne.

The majority of 1st and 2nd year students, as well as foreign students, live on campus, where 54 associations and clubs are managed by the student life Association

=== Around the campus ===
Cultural life is particularly dynamic around Évry, with the Agora Theater and the National Music Conservatory. It is also one of the greenest towns in France, with 220 hectares of green spaces, 6 parks and walks along river Seine. The town is very accessible, located 30 minutes from Paris and reachable by RER line D (Bras de Fer station is 5 minutes walk away and Evry center station is 10 minutes walk away) and the A6 highway.

== Gallery ==
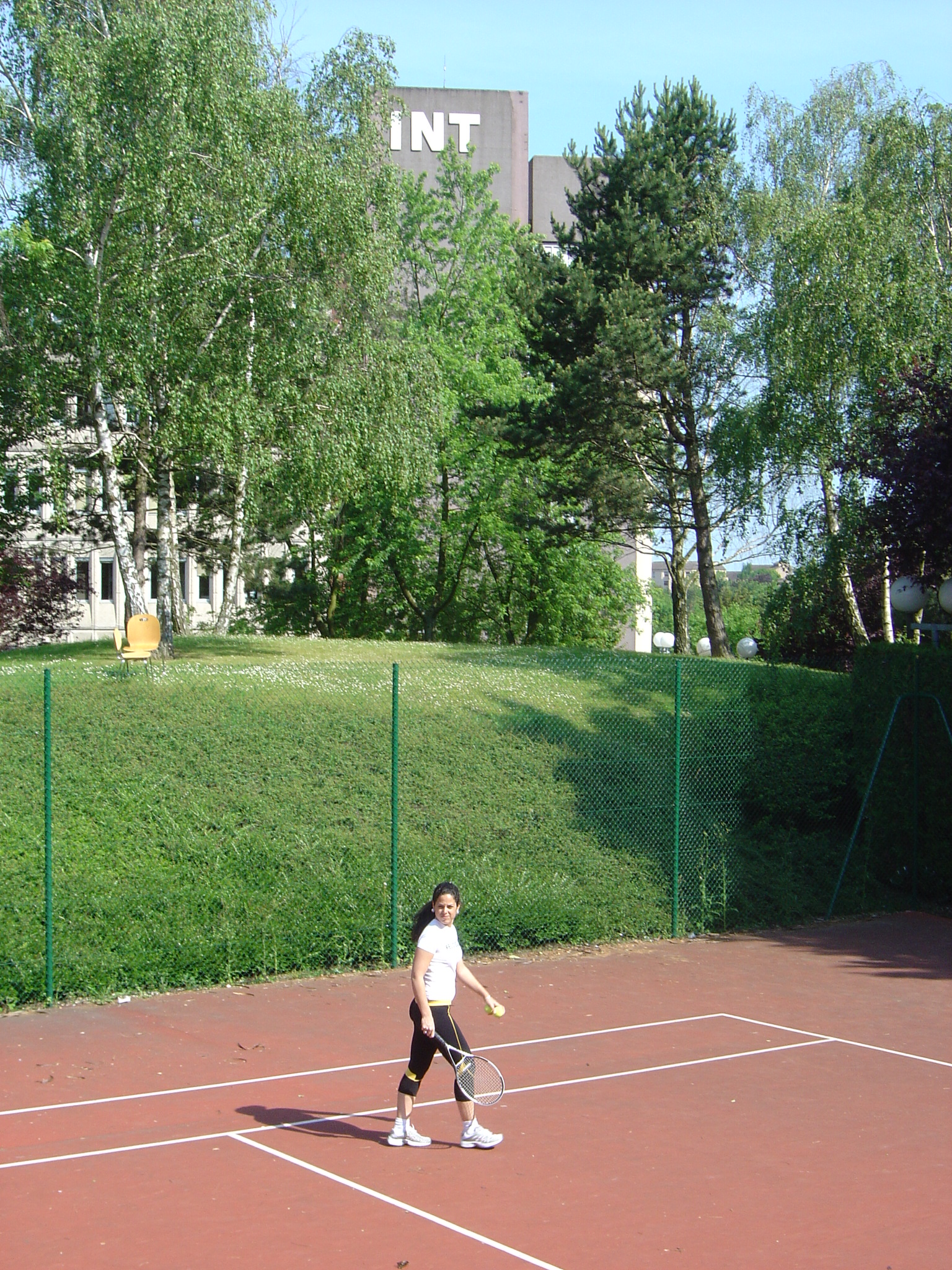
Tennis court on the campus

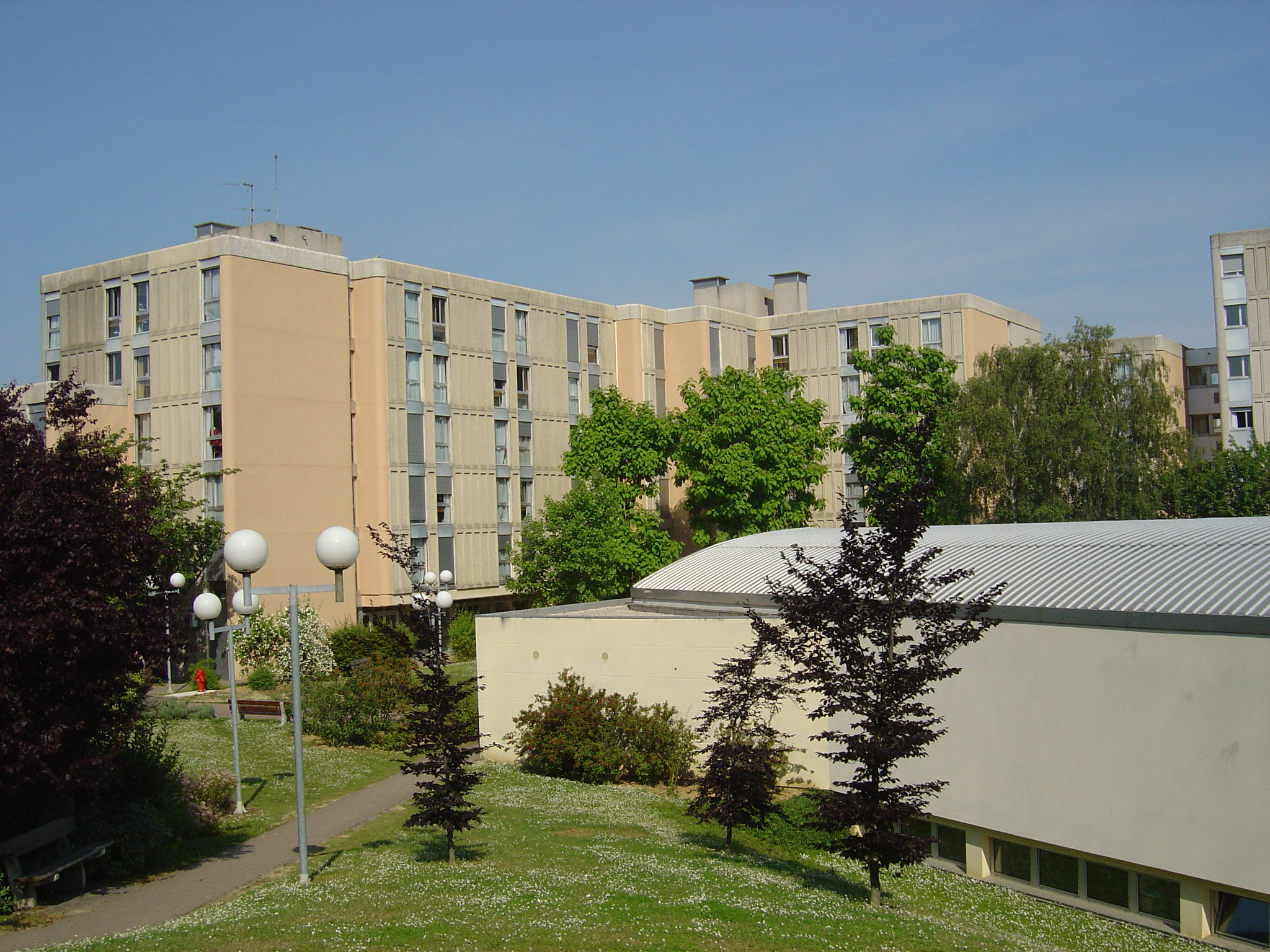
Student residences (MAISEL)

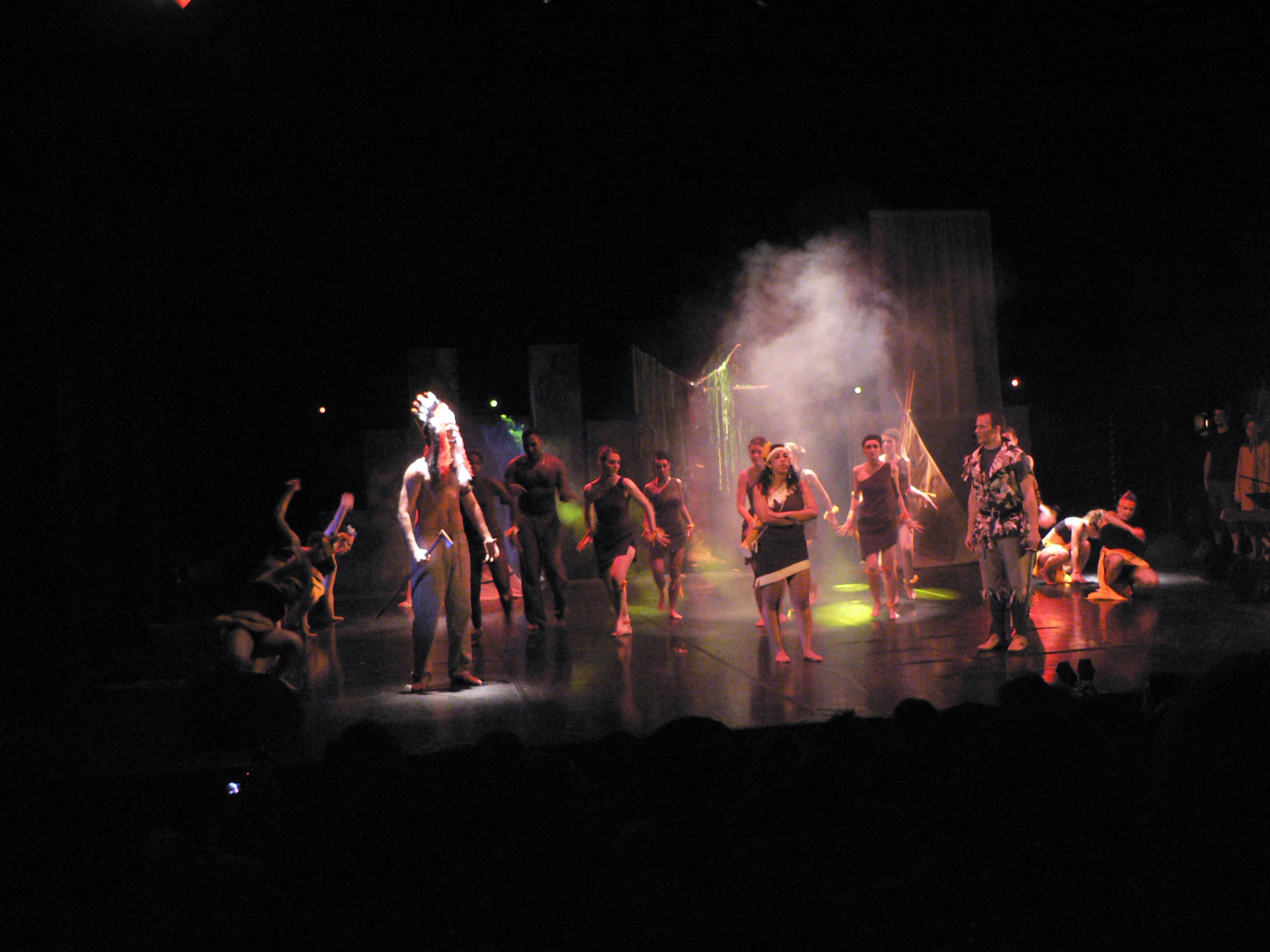
2006 Telecom & Management SudParis Musical : Emoty's
