= Boubacar Kanté =

Physicist

- Born: Bamako, Mali
- Citizenship: Mali and United States
- Education: University of Paris-Saclay
- Known for: Scale-invariant lasers; Berkeley Surface Emitting Laser (BerkSEL or BKSEL); Topological lasers; Top 10 Breakthroughs, Physics World (2017)
- Scientific career
- Workplaces: UC Berkeley; UC San Diego; CNRS
- Website: Kanté group (UC Berkeley)

Boubacar Kanté is a Malian American physicist and engineer working in the field of wave-matter interaction and optoelectronics at the University of California, Berkeley, where he is the inaugural Chenming Hu Endowed Chaired Professor of Electrical Engineering and Computer Sciences (EECS). He is also faculty scientist at the Materials Sciences Division (MSD) of the Lawrence Berkeley National Laboratory. His research focuses on optical phenomena at a very small scale, developing nanostructures to harness the interaction of light and matter, such as metamaterials, scalable lasers, topological lasers, compact lenses, or energy harvesting nanostructures. He is mostly known for his invention of scale-invariant lasers, overcoming a more than six-decade old challenge on the scaling of semiconductor lasers with a laser known as the Berkeley Surface Emitting Laser or BerkSEL. He also pioneered topological lasers with his proposal and demonstration of the world first topological laser based on the quantum Hall effect for light

== Education ==
Dr. Kanté received advanced graduate degree Electrical Engineering and Computer Science from Lille University of Science and Technology in France in 2006 and pursued a Ph.D in physics at the Centre for Nanosciences and Nanotechnologies of University of Paris-Saclay (formerly known as the Institute for Fundamental Electronics) which he received in 2010. He then joined UC Berkeley as a postdoctoral fellow in Xiang Zhang group, before moving to UC San Diego where he became an assistant and then associate professor. In 2019, he returned to UC Berkeley in the EECS department as an associate professor.

== Awards and honors ==
- 2024 Bakar Prize
- 2021 Bakar Fellowship
- 2020 Moore Inventor Fellowship
- 2017 Office of Naval Research Young Investigator Award
- 2016 National Science Foundation (NSF) Career Award
- 2015 Hellman fellowship
- 2010 Richelieu Prize in Sciences
