= List of medical schools in France =

This list of medical schools in France includes current and developing academic institutions which award a Diplôme d'État de Docteur and a diplôme d'études spécialisées (DES). In France, there are 37 medical schools, known locally as "UFR de médecine" (Unités de Formation et de Recherche or "Unit for training and research" in English). They are part of universities and are associated with one of France's 29 university hospital centers (CHU). But they are traditionally called "Facultés de médecine". They are responsible for training students for the medical profession or for other medical professions (midwifery) or paramedical professions (speech therapist, orthoptist, occupational therapist, etc.).

With the Faure Law of 1968, medical faculties became part of a university. They ceased to exist as legal entities, becoming teaching and research units, then training and research units in 1984.

== Auvergne-Rhône-Alpes ==
Name	City	University	Established	Type	Ref.
Clermont-Ferrand Faculty of Medicine Faculté de médecine de Clermont-Ferrand	Clermont-Ferrand	Clermont Auvergne University	1681	Public	
Lyon East Faculty of Medicine Faculté de médecine de Lyon Est	Lyon	Claude Bernard University	1852	Public	
Charles Mérieux Faculty of Medicine Faculté de médecine et de maïeutique Lyon Sud Charles Mérieux	Oullins-Pierre-Bénite	Claude Bernard University	1852	Public	
Jacques Lisfranc Faculty of Medicine Faculté de médecine Jacques Lisfranc	Saint-Étienne	Jean Monnet University	1969	Public	
Grenoble Alpes University Faculty of Medicine Faculté de médecine et de pharmacie de Grenoble-Alpes	La Tronche	Grenoble Alpes University	1962	Public	

== Bourgogne-Franche-Comté ==
Name	City	University	Established	Type	Ref.
Burgundy Faculty of Health Sciences Faculté des sciences de la santé de Dijon	Dijon	University of Burgundy	1967	Public	
University of Franche-Comté, UFR of Health Sciences UFR des sciences de la santé	Besançon	University of Franche-Comté	1967	Public	

== Brittany ==
Name	City	University	Established	Type	Ref.
Brest University Medical School Faculté de médecine et sciences de la santé de l'université de Bretagne occidentale	Brest	UBO, University of Western Brittany	1950	Public	
University of Rennes Faculty of Medecine Faculté de médecine de l'université de Rennes	Rennes	University of Rennes	1954	Public	

== Centre-Val de Loire ==
Name	City	University	Established	Type	Ref.
Tours Faculty of Medicine Faculté de médecine de Tours	Tours	University of Tours	1841	Public	

== Grand Est ==
Name	City	University	Established	Type	Ref.
Faculty of Medicine of Nancy Faculté de médecine de Nancy	Nancy	University of Lorraine	1592	Public	
University of Strasbourg, Faculty of Medicine Faculté de médecine de Strasbourg	Strasbourg	University of Strasbourg	1794	Public	
URCA, UFR of Medicine UFR de médecine de Reims	Reims	URCA, University of Reims Champagne-Ardenne	1978	Public	

== Hauts-de-France ==
Name	City	University	Established	Type	Ref.
Henri Warembourg Faculty of Medicine Faculté de médecine Henri Warembourg	Lille	University of Lille	1876	Public	
Lille Faculty of Medicine, Maieutics and Health Sciences Faculté libre de médecine de Lille	Lille	Catholic University of Lille	1805	Private	

== Île-de-France – Paris region ==
Name	City	University	Established	Type	Ref.
Department of Medicine, Paris-Cité University Faculty of Health UFR de médecine de la Faculté de santé de l'université Paris-Cité (formerly Descartes and Diderot, and Paris Faculty of Medicine)	Paris	Paris Cité University	1808 (Paris Faculty of Medicine)	Public	
Sorbonne Faculty of Health Sciences Faculté de médecine de Sorbonne Université (formerly UPMC Medical School and Paris Faculty of Medicine)	Paris	Sorbonne University	1808 (Paris Faculty of Medicine)	Public	
Paris-Saclay Medical School Faculté de médecine de Paris-Saclay	Le Kremlin-Bicêtre	Paris-Saclay University	1968	Public	
UVSQ Simone Veil Medical School UFR de Santé Simone Veil - Paris Île-de-France Ouest (PIFO)	Montigny-le-Bretonneux	UVSQ, University of Versailles, Paris-Saclay University	2001	Public	
UPEC Faculty of Health Sciences Faculté de médecine de Créteil	Créteil	UPEC, University of Paris-Est Créteil	1970	Public	
USPN, UFR of Health, Medicine and Human Biology UFR de Santé, Médecine et Biologie Humaine	Bobigny	USPN, Sorbonne Paris North University	1970	Public	

== Nouvelle-Aquitaine ==
Name	City	University	Established	Type	Ref.
University of Bordeaux UFR of Medicine UFR de médecine de Bordeaux	Bordeaux	University of Bordeaux	1829	Public	
University of Limoges Faculty of Medicine Faculté de médecine de Limoges	Limoges	University of Limoges	1646	Public	
University of Poitiers Faculty of Medicine Faculté de médecine de Poitiers	Poitiers	University of Poitiers	1432	Public	

== Normandy ==
Name	City	University	Established	Type	Ref.
University of Rouen Normandy Faculty of Health Sciences Faculté de médecine et pharmacie de Rouen	Rouen	University of Rouen Normandy	1954	Public	
University of Caen Normandy UFR of Health UFR de santé de Caen	Caen	University of Caen Normandy	1438	Public	

== Occitanie ==
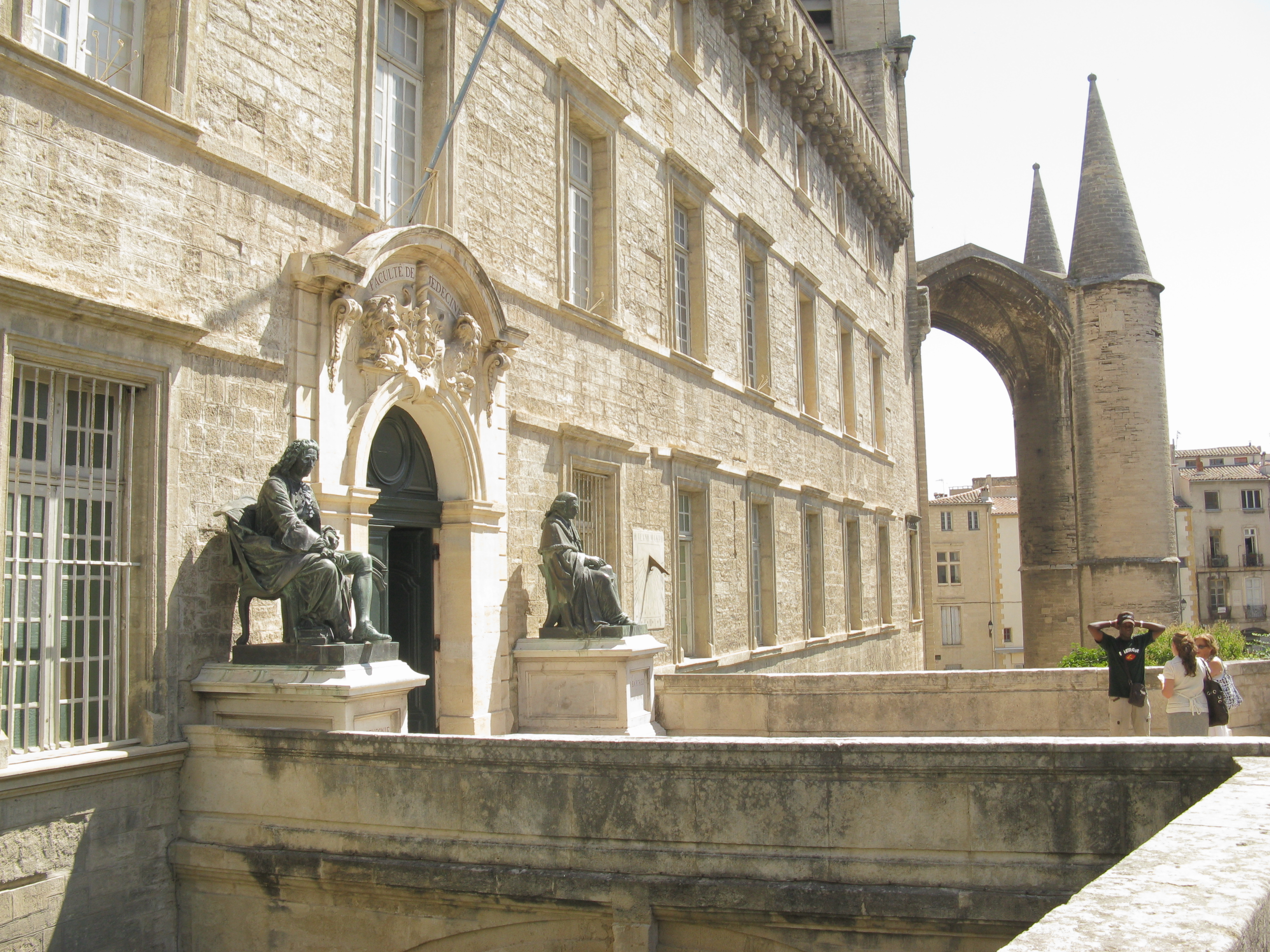
University of Montpellier Faculty of Medicine, founded in 1220. The historic site is still occupied by the faculty.

Name	City	University	Established	Type	Ref.
University of Montpellier Faculty of Medicine Faculté de médecine de Montpellier	Montpellier	University of Montpellier	1220	Public	
Department of Medicine, Toulouse Faculty of Health Département de médecine de la faculté de santé de Toulouse	Toulouse	Paul Sabatier University	1808	Public	

== Pays de la Loire ==
Name	City	University	Established	Type	Ref.
University of Angers Medical School Faculté de santé de l'université d'Angers	Angers	University of Angers	1432	Public	
University of Nantes Faculty of Medicine Faculté de médecine de Nantes	Nantes	University of Nantes	1460	Public	

== Provence-Alpes-Côte d'Azur ==
Name	City	University	Established	Type	Ref.
Faculty of Medical and Paramedical Sciences of Aix-Marseille Faculté des sciences médicales et paramédicales de Marseille	Marseille	Aix-Marseille University	1958	Public	
Côte d'Azur University Faculty of Medicine Faculté de médecine de Nice	Nice	Côte d'Azur University	1965		
