= Alain R. Thierry =

French geneticist and cancer researcher

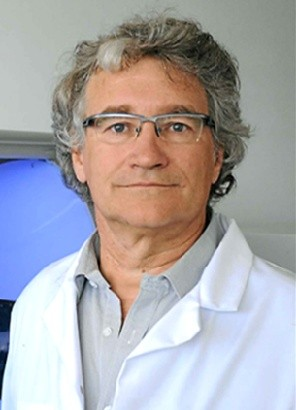
- Born: 21 October 1959 (age 66); France
- Education: University of Clermont-Ferrand (France) University of Montpellier II (france) Faculty of Médecine, University of Paris-Sud (France)
- Awards: 2021: Innovation Prize, Montpellier Université d'Excellence (MUSE) 2016: Grand Prix for Therapeutic Innovation, Beatrice Denys Foundation & the French Foundation for Medical Research (FRM). 2010: GEFLUC Award (Collective of French Companies against Cancer), France. 2002: National Innovation Award, French Ministry of Education & Research. 1994: Federal Technology Award, National Cancer Institute, National Institutes of Health, Bethesda, USA.
- Scientific career
- Fields: Genetics and Cancer Research
- Workplaces: Georgetown University Medical Centre National Cancer Institute - National Institutes of Health Université de Montpellier IRCM / INSERM

Alain Thierry (born 21 October 1959) is a French geneticist and cancer researcher. He has been the principal investigator in numerous discoveries in drug delivery innovation and application in oncology. He now specializes in the clinical applications of liquid biopsy that exploits circulating DNA as a biomarker, notably in cancer care management. He is currently Director of Research at the INSERM's Cancer Research Institute in Montpellier, France.

== Education ==
Thierry obtained his primary degree in Cellular and Molecular Biology (MSc) at the University of Clermont-Ferrand in France in 1982. In 1986 he completed his PhD in Biochemistry, Cellular and Molecular Pharmacology at the University of Montpellier II. The following year he was awarded the Certificat d'Etudes Supérieures (CES) in Human Biology in Clinical and Experimental Oncology, from the Paris-Sud Faculty of Medicine.

== Career ==
Thierry began his career in the US as a Postdoctoral Fellow (1988–92) at the Lombardi Cancer Centre in the Georgetown University Medical Centre (Washington DC), going on to work there as Adjunct Assistant Professor from 1992 to 1994. From 1992 to 1996 he was also a Visiting Scientist at the Laboratory of Tumor Cell Biology at the National Institutes of Health in Bethesda, where he worked with Dr. Robert C. Gallo, the laboratory's Director.

Returning to France, from 1997 to 2000 he served as Scientific Director at the Biovector Therapeutics company. From 2001 to 2007 he was Associate Professor at Montpellier University's Faculty of Sciences. Since 2008, he has been the Senior Investigator and Director of Research at the INSERM's Cancer Research Institute of Montpellier (IRCM).

== Research ==
Thierry specializes in the clinical application of liquid biopsy that exploits circulating DNA as a biomarker, notably in cancer management care. He has been the principal investigator in numerous discoveries in drug delivery innovation and application in oncology.

It was during his period at Georgetown that he showed the circumvention of multi-drug resistance in tumors through drug delivery. He built on this work at the US National Cancer Institute, developing gene therapy for cancer and HIV, in particular the first long term expression of a transgene by systemic administration with a synthetic delivery system.

While at the University of Montpellier, he worked first on the pharmacokinetics of therapeutic vectorized HIV antisense oligonucleotides in primates (2002). He then went on to demonstrate the biomimetic supramolecular auto-organization of DNA in a synthetic complex (2006).

Since 2006, Thierry has focused increasingly on clinical and basic research into the role of circulating DNA (cirDNA), and on its diagnostic potential in oncology.

His team were amongst the first (in April 2020) to suggest NETs as a key player in COVID-19 pathogenesis (2020) and have shown long COVID-19 (COVID post-acute phase syndrome) to be an effect of the persistence of the production of NETs and auto-antibodies. Recently (2022), they have demonstrated cirDNA association with NETs production in cancer and lupus. His recent work revealed the quantitative and qualitative association of NETs with microclots in Long COVID patients.

Thierry has in recent years also pioneered work on cirDNA fragmentation, proposing potential solutions towards cancer screening through the use of fragmentomics. This builds on earlier work (2011) on the fragmentation levels of cancer patient cirDNA.

Most recently, Thierry and his team discovered the presence of circulating extracellular cell-free mitochondria, opening new avenues of research and treatment, for instance mitochondria transplantation.

According to Google Scholar, he has an h-index of 51.

== Awards and honors ==
- 2021: Innovation Prize, Montpellier Université d'Excellence (MUSE)
- 2016: Grand Prix for Therapeutic Innovation, Beatrice Denys Foundation & the French Foundation for Medical Research (FRM).
- 2010: GEFLUC Award (Collective of French Companies against Cancer), France.
- 2002: National Innovation Award, French Ministry of Education & Research.
- 1994: Federal Technology Award, National Cancer Institute, National Institutes of Health, Bethesda, US.
