= Campus of the Paris-Saclay University =

Campus in Île-de-France, France

Paris-Saclay Campus
- Campus of the Paris-Saclay University
- Campus universitaire Paris-Saclay
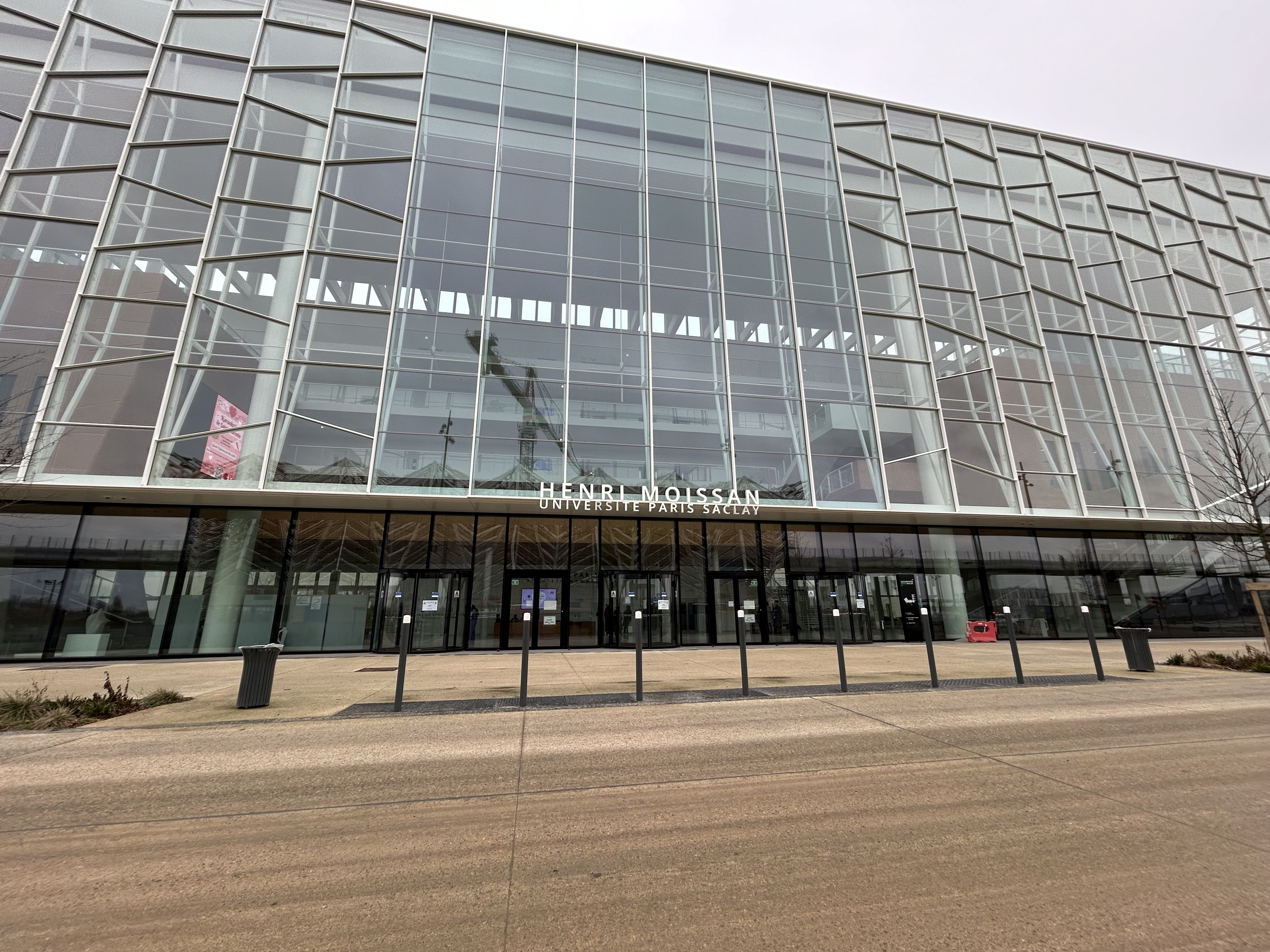
- The Henri Moisson Centre, in 2024. It hosts the Faculty of Medicine and the departments of Biology and Chemistry of the Faculty of Sciences.
- Interactive map of Paris-Saclay Campus
- Country: France
- Region: Île-de-France
- Villes: Orsay, Gif-sur-Yvette, Bures-sur-Yvette
- Founded by: Irène Joliot-Curie, Frédéric Joliot-Curie
- Named after: Saclay plateau

Area
  - Total: 200 ha (490 acres)
- Part of: Paris-Saclay University
- Established: 1955
- Students: 60,000

The main campus of the Paris-Saclay University is in Orsay, France. Initiated in 1955 on the Saclay Plateau, it is 20 kilometers southwest of Paris, in the heart of the Paris-Saclay scientific and technological center.

The central campus is bordered to the northeast and east by the N118 national road, to the west by the French Alternative Energies and Atomic Energy Commission facilities, and to the south by RER line B. The Bois de la Guyonnerie runs through the middle of the campus on either side. The Paris-Saclay campus comprises 300 buildings on an area of approximately 495 acres (200 ha). It welcomes more than 13,000 students and 2,100 doctoral students from different backgrounds, as well as 1,700 teacher-researchers and 1,800 administrative and technical employees. Its numerous teaching buildings and 60 research laboratories are located on a 200 ha site of woodland containing many rare species.

The Paris-Saclay University campus is part of the Paris-Saclay technology cluster, of which it constitutes one of the historic hearts with the installation of laboratories of the Paris Faculty of Sciences in 1956. As part of this project, the former University of Paris-Sud and the Paris-Saclay Public Development Establishment supported the creation of PROTO204, a third place intended to host conferences, meetings and co-working activities, to facilitate student entrepreneurship.

== History ==
From 1955 to 1971, it was an annex campus of the Faculty of Sciences of the University of Paris, until the creation of the University of Paris-Sud XI from the Orsay Faculty of Sciences. In 2019, the campus became one of the main sites of Paris-Saclay University, on a site that extends from the Chevreuse valley to the Saclay plateau.

After World War II, the rapid growth of nuclear physics and chemistry meant that research needed more and more powerful accelerators, which required large areas. In Paris, the Latin Quarter soon became overwhelmed by the growing number of students. The University of Paris looked for space in the south of Paris near Orsay.

== Buildings ==
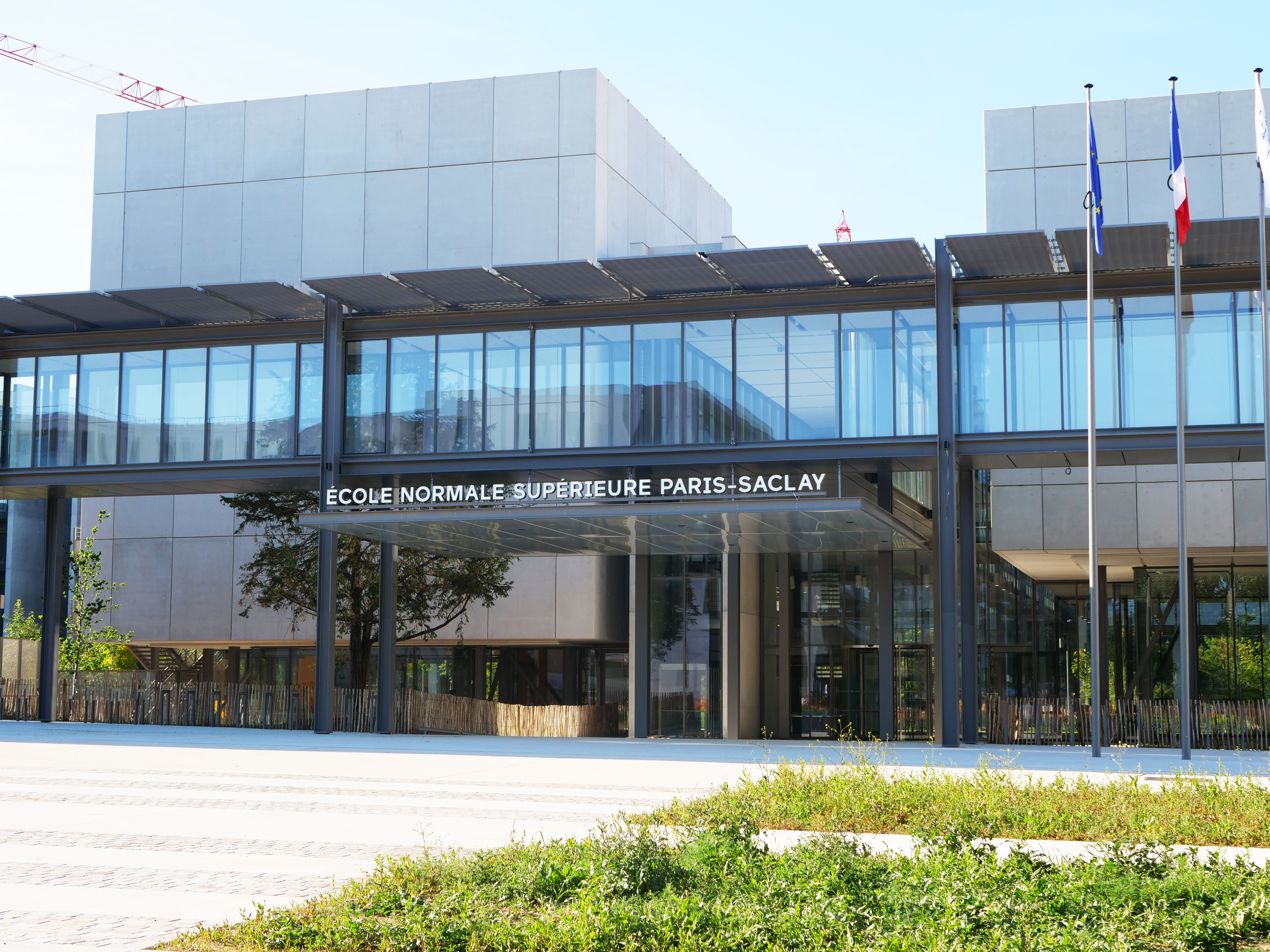
The Paris-Saclay University École normale supérieure.

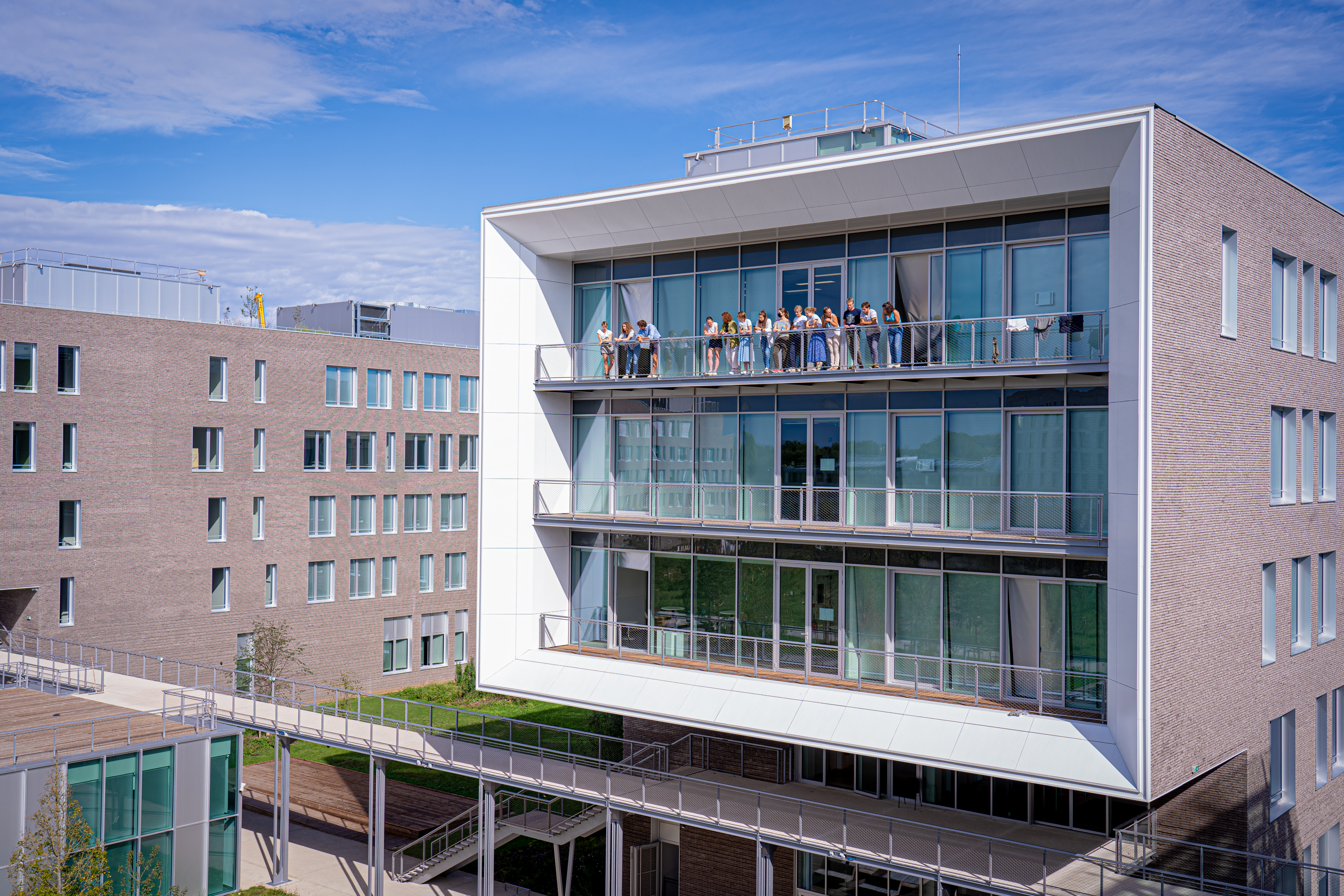
The Paris-Saclay Agro Campus, on the Plateau.

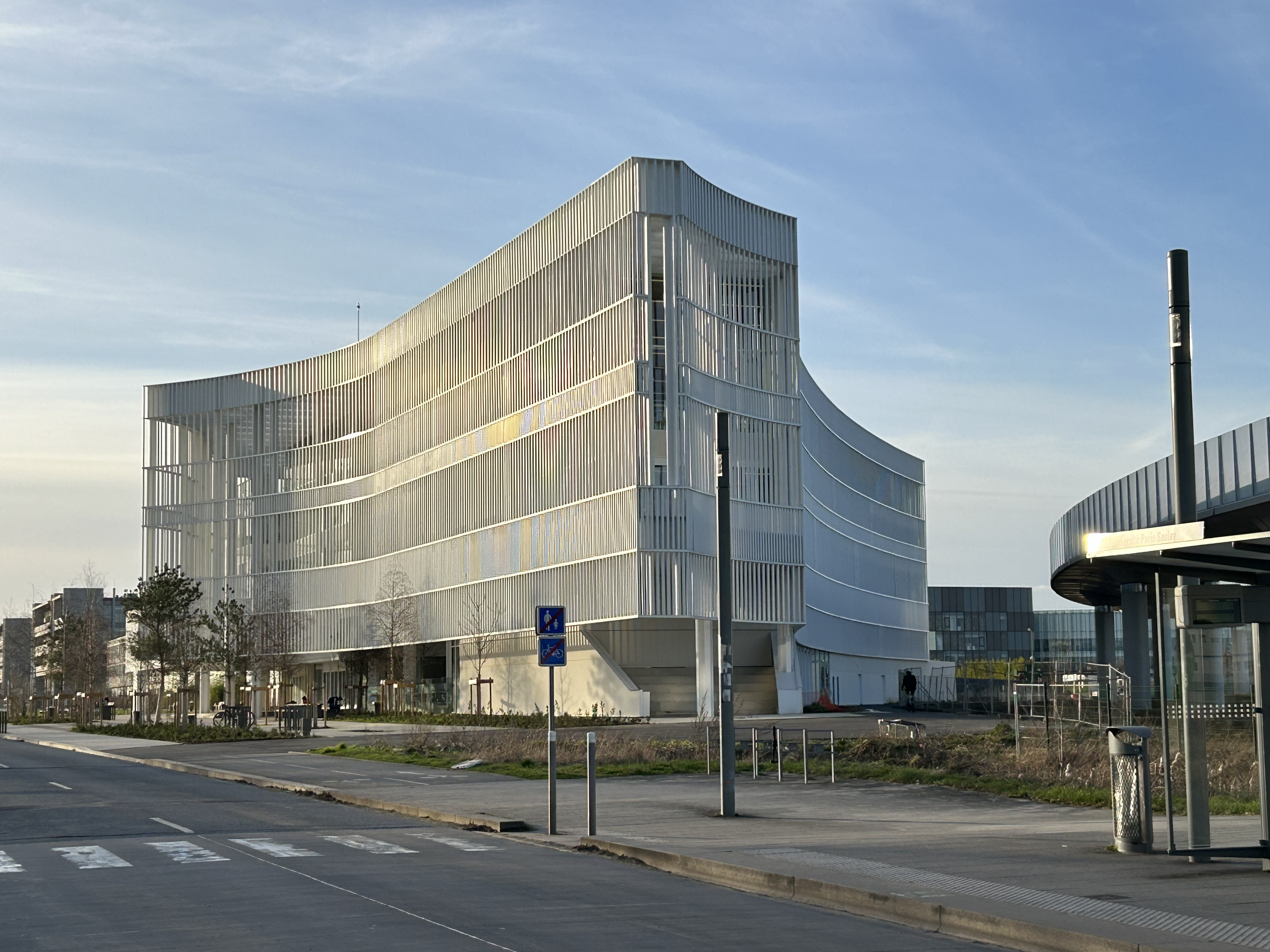
The Lumen Library.

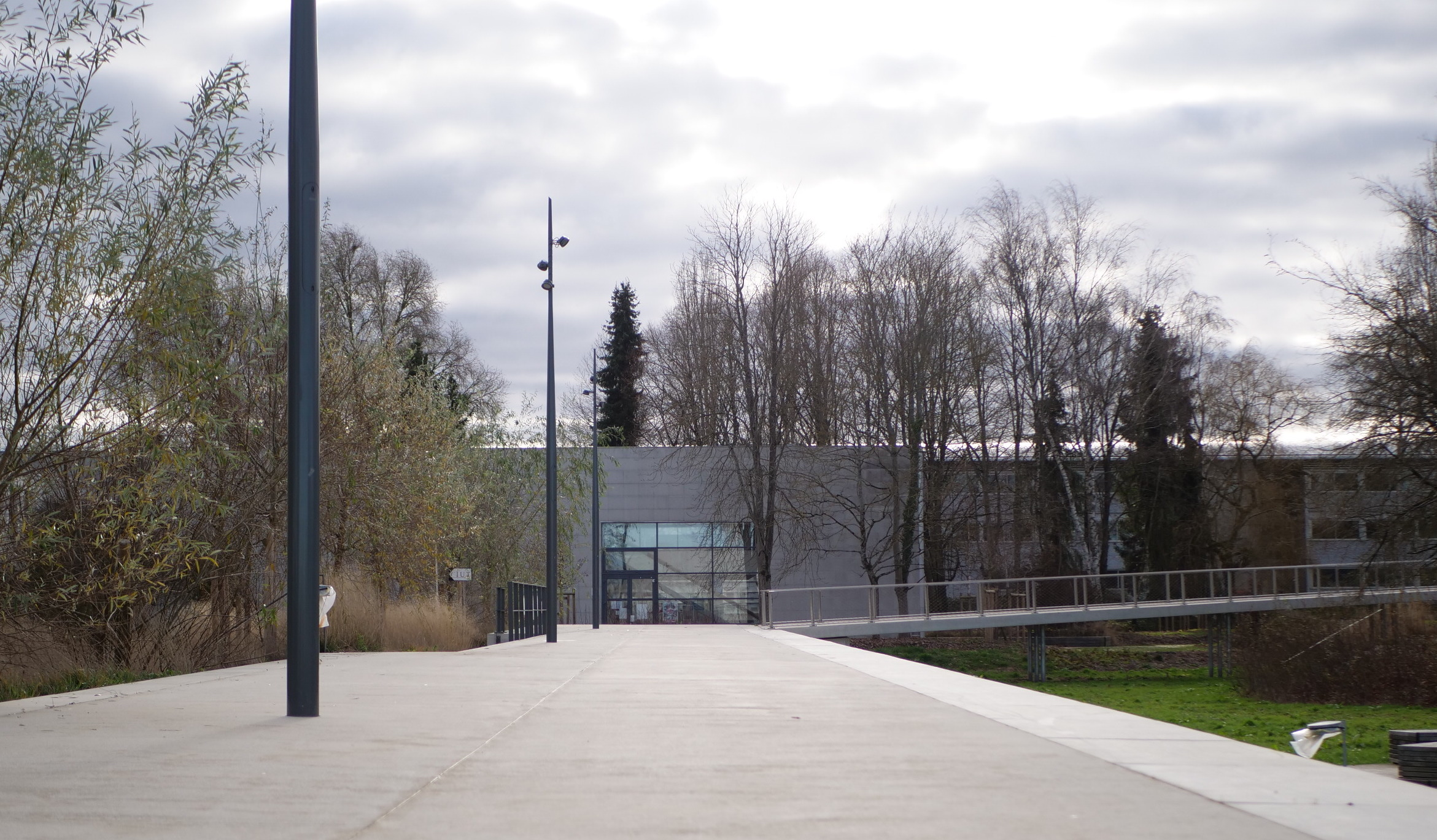
Orsay University Institute of Technology

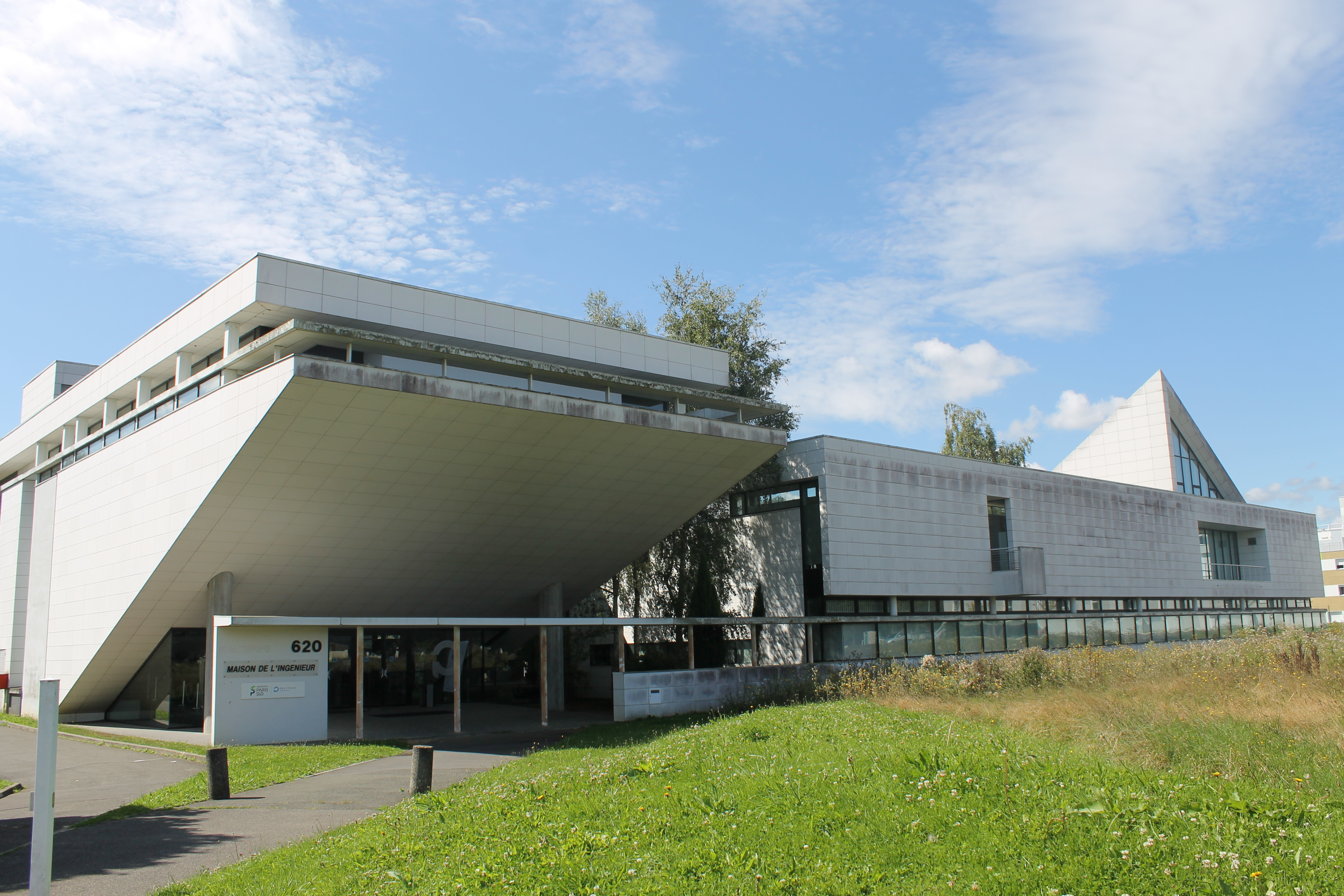
Paris-Saclay Polytechnic School

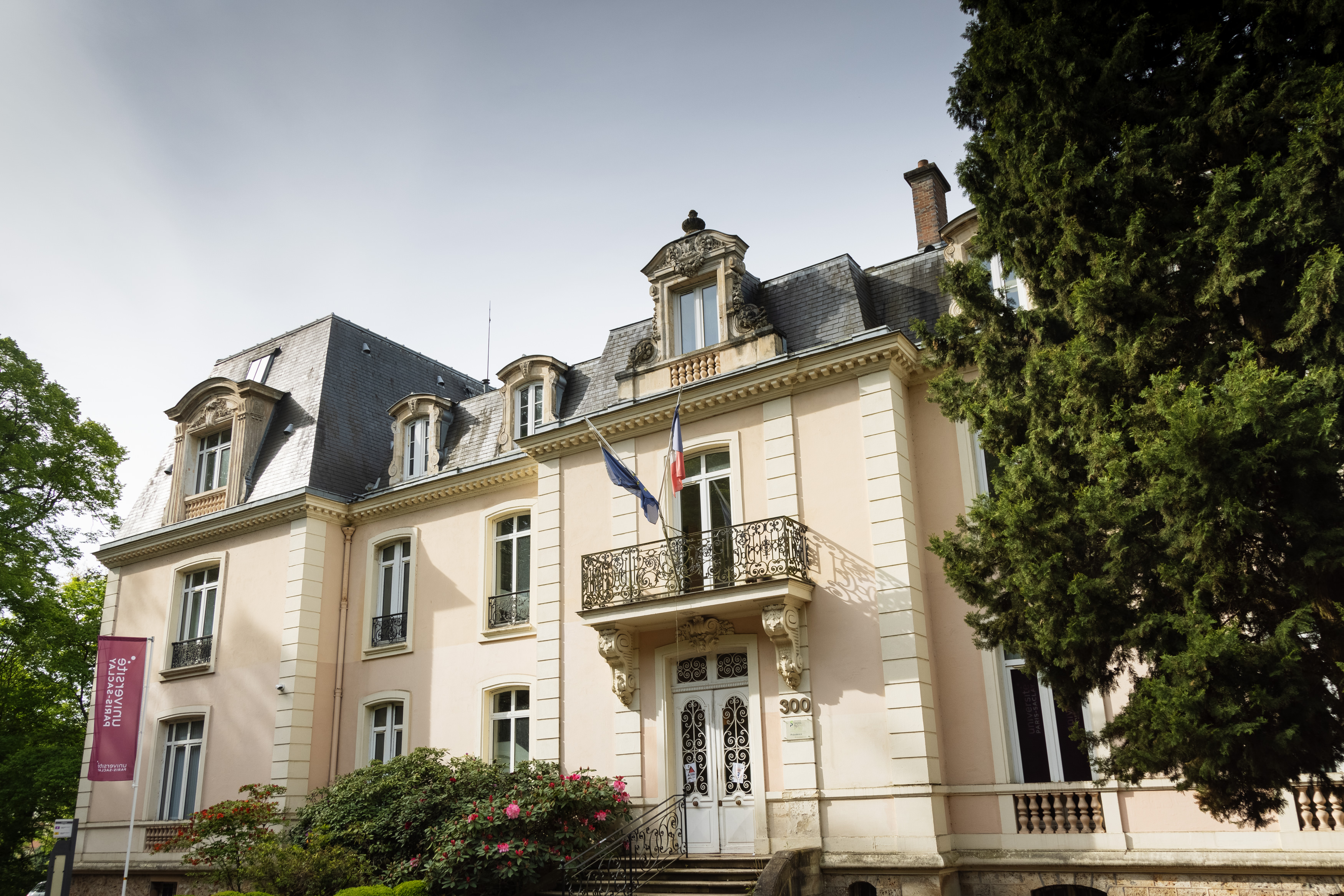
The Château de Launay, former university headquarters.

== See also ==
- Paris-Saclay University
- Paris-Saclay
- Latin Quarter
