= Plateau de Saclay =

Area near Paris, France

Coordinates: 48.74°N 2.17°E

The Plateau de Saclay (French pronunciation: [plato də saklɛ]), also called Silicon Valley Européenne (in English, European Silicon Valley), is located north of Essonne and south-east of Yvelines, 20 km south of Paris. It is bounded by the valley of the Yvette (Vallée de Chevreuse) to the south and east, and the valley of the Bièvre to the north.

It hosts world-class universities, engineering and management schools and research centers, such as Paris-Saclay University, École Polytechnique, ENSAE Paris, Telecom Paris, HEC, ENSTA ParisTech, CentraleSupélec, Agro ParisTech, IOGS, IHES, CEA, Inria, Danone research center, one Thales research facility, and national scientific instruments such as the SOLEIL synchrotron and the NeuroSpin Project. In order to create an even more attractive campus, other engineering schools and high-value centers are planned: EDF headquarters for instance.

== Geography ==
The plateau is located about 165 meters above sea level. It is traversed by ditches that drain water. These works, as well as the étang de Saclay, located near the town of Saclay, were intended to supply water to Versailles Castle (and in particular its fountains).

It includes the municipalities of Gif-sur-Yvette (Quartier de Moulon), Orsay, Palaiseau, Saclay, Saint-Aubin, Vauhallan, Villiers-le-Bâcle in the department of Essonne, Toussus-le-Noble, Châteaufort, Les Loges-en-Josas and Buc in Yvelines.

The southern part is called plateau de Moulon. It extends to the new town of Saint-Quentin-en-Yvelines (plateau de Villaroy).

=== Ponds and ditches ===
When, from 1670, Louis XIV built his Versailles Castle, he asked Le Nôtre to create a sumptuous park enlivened by a myriad of fountains, waterfalls and ponds. Necessary to bring the water to Versailles, Jean-Baptiste Colbert put out two major projects:

- The Machine de Marly was supposed to pump up the waters of the Seine to the Plaine de Louveciennes.
- Collection and storm water drainage from Trappes and Saclay via channels.

It is a hydraulic system with a unique set of ponds all connected by 200 km of open ditches spread over 13000 hectares (32000 acres ), which was created to supply the fountains of Versailles Castle by mere gravity. On the plateau de Saclay, six ditches, including the Saint-Aubin ditch, the Favreuse ditch and the Corbeville ditch, feed the old pond étang Vieux (37 hectares (91 acres)) and the new pond étang Neuf (33 hectares (81 acres)) near Saclay with a capacity of approximately 1.6 million m³.

== Economics / Urban ==
The plateau de Saclay has a long agricultural tradition. However, it became an important center of education, scientific research and research and development after World War II, and especially since the 1960s. Many grandes écoles and research centers are located on the plateau, and it is anticipated that the campus becomes one of the most important in Europe in the coming years.

Municipalities are part of the plateau agglomeration communities:

- the Communauté d'agglomération Paris-Saclay (CAPS): Villiers-le-Bâcle, Saclay, Vauhallan, Igny, Saint-Aubin, Orsay, Palaiseau, Bures-sur-Yvette, Gif-sur-Yvette, Gometz-le-Châtel ...
- the Communauté d'agglomération Versailles Grand Parc : Buc, Jouy-en-Josas, Les Loges-en-Josas, Toussus-le-Noble, Bièvres ...

It is crossed from north to south by the Route nationale 118, the axis Boulogne-Billancourt - Les Ulis. It is not directly served by the RER, but the RER lines B and C respectively serve the Vallée de Chevreuse and the valley of the Bièvre, surrounding the plateau. Within the framework of the project "Grand Paris", the final scheme adopted on 26 May 2011 by the Société du Grand Paris concerning the transport network Grand Paris Express provides an automated metro line linking Versailles (Gare de Versailles-Chantiers) to the Paris-Orly Airport via the plateau de Saclay. The Skytrain project raises, however, hostility of the population.

== Le Quartier de Moulon ==
The Quartier de Moulon is the south-eastern part of the Saclay Plateau, located in the municipalities of Gif-sur-Yvette and Orsay. This is another place for research and higher education (Campus d'Orsay).

== History ==
Recent work on the plateau by archaeologists from Inrap and CNRS show the presence of an almost continuous occupation since the first Iron Age. A Roman villa is located on the site of Moulon.

In 2006, a Gallic village was discovered on the plateau de Moulon. It was probably composed of one hundred members: artisans, farmers and ranchers.

The ferme d'Orsigny (Orsigny farm) (resulting from the combination of two working farms) occupies the site of an ancient Gallo-Roman (Orsiniacum) villa, which itself followed a Celtic settlement. The site was reoccupied by the Merovingians after its destruction by fire. From the eleventh to the thirteenth centuries, Orsigny was refounded by the monks of Saint-Germain-des-Prés. It became, in the sixteenth century, a hamlet around a farm belonging to the family Mérault, which managed to establish an area of 256 hectares, divided later. In 1644, the hamlet was depopulated, an heiress of Mérault donated the domain to the congregation of the mission of St. Vincent de Paul. It reached the area of 345 hectares in 1670. In 1789, the church property was nationalized and sold to Parisians.

== See also ==
- Paris-Saclay
