= Paris-Saclay Faculty of Sciences =

Training and research unit of the Paris-Saclay University located in Orsay, France

Coordinates: 42°22′21.67″N 71°07′06.73″W

- Logo
- Former names: Paris Faculty of Sciences (branch)
- Type: Public
- Established: 1808 Faculté des sciences de Paris; 1956 Orsay campus
- Dean: Christine Paulin-Mohring
- Founders: Irène Joliot-Curie and Frédéric Joliot-Curie
- Academic staff: 800 faculty 1000 researchers
- Undergraduates: 5400
- Postgraduates: 4200
- Location: Paris-Saclay Campus, Orsay, Île-de-France, France
- Campus: Urban
- Website: sciences.universite-paris-saclay.fr

The Paris-Saclay Faculty of Sciences or Orsay Faculty of Sciences, in French : Faculté des sciences d'Orsay, is the mathematics and physics school within Paris-Saclay University, founded in 1956. It offers undergraduate and graduate degrees in mathematics, physics and chemistry (though its undergraduates are officially enrolled in Paris-Saclay Undergraduate School).

Previously the Paris-Sud Faculty of Sciences, the School assumed its current structure in 2019. Christine Paulin-Mohring has been the School's dean since 2016.

Recent investments as part of the Paris-Saclay cluster have enlarged the School's faculty and upgraded its facilities. In July 2020, Paris-Saclay was ranked first worldwide for Mathematics by Academic Ranking of World Universities (ARWU) and 9th worldwide for Physics (1st in Europe). The Faculty has produced numerous research discoveries and many distinguished alumni and professors.

== History ==
Established in 1956, the Paris-Saclay Faculty of Sciences was originally part of the University of Paris (founded in c. 1150), which was subsequently split into several universities.

After World War II, the rapid growth of nuclear physics and chemistry meant that research needed more and more powerful accelerators, which required large areas. The University of Paris, the École Normale Supérieure and the Collège de France looked for space in the south of Paris near Orsay. Later some of the teaching activity of the Faculty of Sciences in Paris was transferred to Orsay in 1956 at the request of Irène Joliot-Curie and Frédéric Joliot-Curie. The rapid increase of students led to the independence of the Orsay Center on March 1, 1965.

Now it hosts a great number of laboratories on its large (236 ha) campus in Paris-Saclay. Many of the top French laboratories are among them especially in particle physics, nuclear physics, astrophysics, atomic physics and molecular physics, condensed matter physics, theoretical physics, electronics, nanoscience and nanotechnology. The faculty comprises some 40 research units.

== Nobel and Fields laureates ==
- Albert Fert - Professor - Nobel in Physics - 2007
- Pierre-Gilles de Gennes - Professor - Nobel in Physics - 1991
- Ngô Bảo Châu - PhD and Professor - Fields Medal - 2010
- Wendelin Werner - Professor - Fields Medal - 2006
- Laurent Lafforgue - PhD and Professor - Fields Medal - 2002
- Jean-Christophe Yoccoz - PhD and Professor - Fields Medal - 1994
- Pierre Deligne - PhD - Fields Medal - 1978

== See also ==
- Paris-Saclay University
- Campus of the Paris-Saclay University
- Paris-Saclay
- France
- Science
- Mathematics
