= Centre for Nanosciences and Nanotechnologies =

French research center

Coordinates: 48.7122°N 2.1963°E

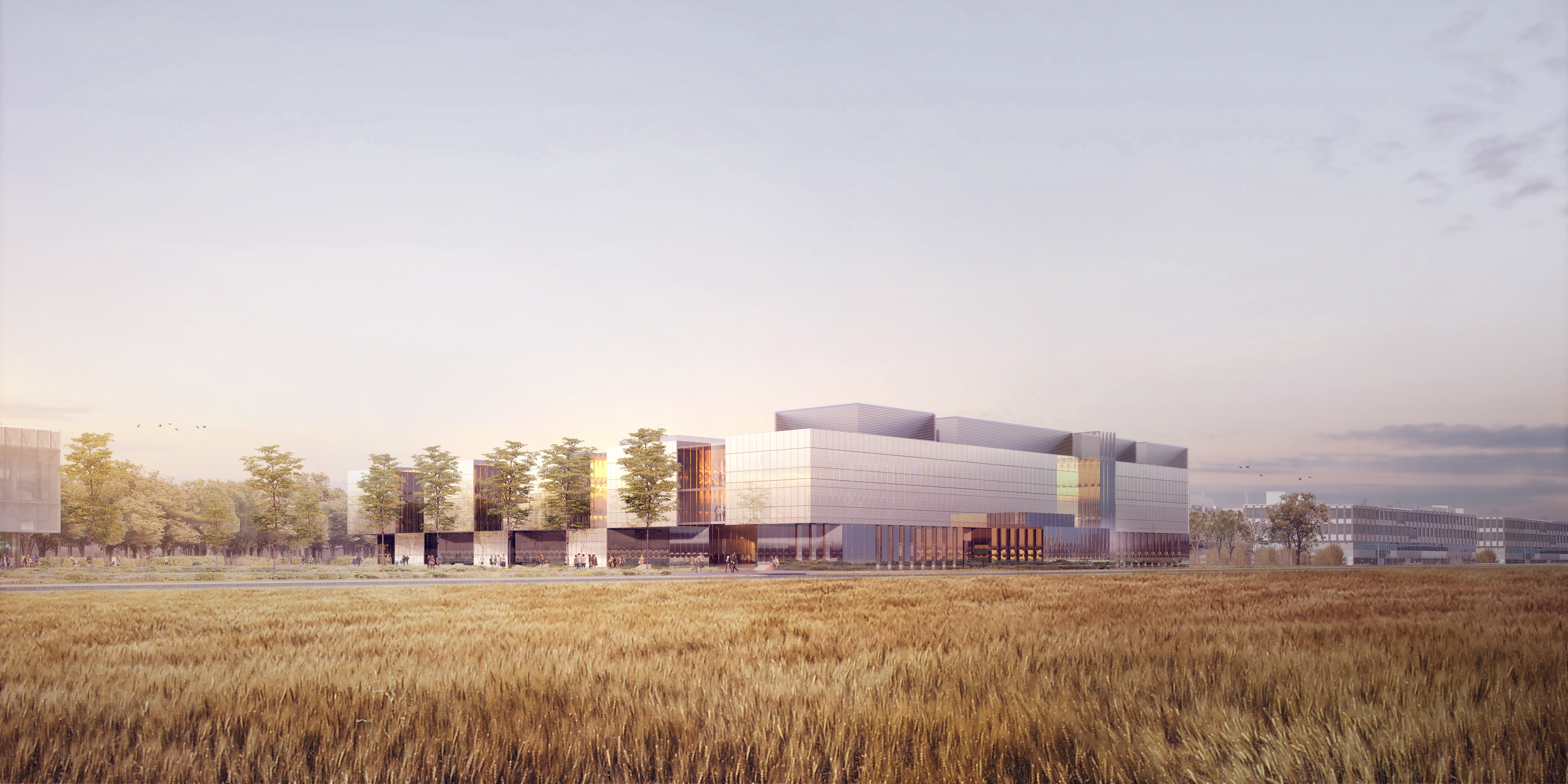
- Focus: Nanoscience
- Head: Giancarlo Faini (director),
- Owner: University of Paris-Saclay, CNRS
- Location: Palaiseau, France
- Website: www.c2n.universite-paris-saclay.fr/en/

The Centre for Nanosciences and Nanotechnologies (French: Centre de Nanosciences et de Nanotechnologies de l'université Paris-Saclay) or C2N, is a nanotechnology laboratory created as joint research unit (UMR 9001) between the University of Paris-Saclay and the French National Centre for Scientific Research (CNRS).

CNRS and the university announced this collaboration in 2013, with the goal of uniting two existing laboratories of Ile-de-France: the Institute for Fundamental Electronics (Institut d'Electronique Fondamentale, IEF) and the Laboratory for Photonics Nanostructures (Laboratoire de Photonique et de Nanostructures, LPN).

Facility construction began in April, 2015, the first stone was laid on June 28, 2016, and the C2N facility began operations in September, 2017. It is located on the Paris-Saclay campus in Palaiseau, 20 miles south of Paris, France.

According to the European Union's MIR-Bose project, "The Centre for Nanoscience and Nanotechnology (C2N) is one of the largest laboratories of University Paris-Sud with 283 members including 83 permanent researchers, 160 PhD students and post-doctoral researchers and 40 technical and administrative staff members."

== Research areas ==
The core of the research is based silicon and III-V nano-electronics, nanomagnetism (spintronics), micro- and nano-photonics (III-V and silicon photonics), and nanosystems (manufacturing and characterization.) It has four main divisions:

- Photonics department,
- Materials Department,
- Nanoelectronics Department,
- Microsystems and Nanobiofluidics Department.

The C2N is one of three major French centers of research on nanotechnology (the other two are in Grenoble and Toulouse.) Several other related research groups are located near Paris-Saclay, including Thales, and STMicroelectronics. Scientists from other institutions visit C2N to make use of its single-photon source.

C2N researchers fabricated a chip used as the miniature "particle collider" that produced the first solid confirmation of the quasiparticles anyons, a scientific collaboration with ENS researchers that was featured on the cover of Science.
