= Paris-Saclay University =

Public research university based in Paris, France

- Université Paris-Saclay
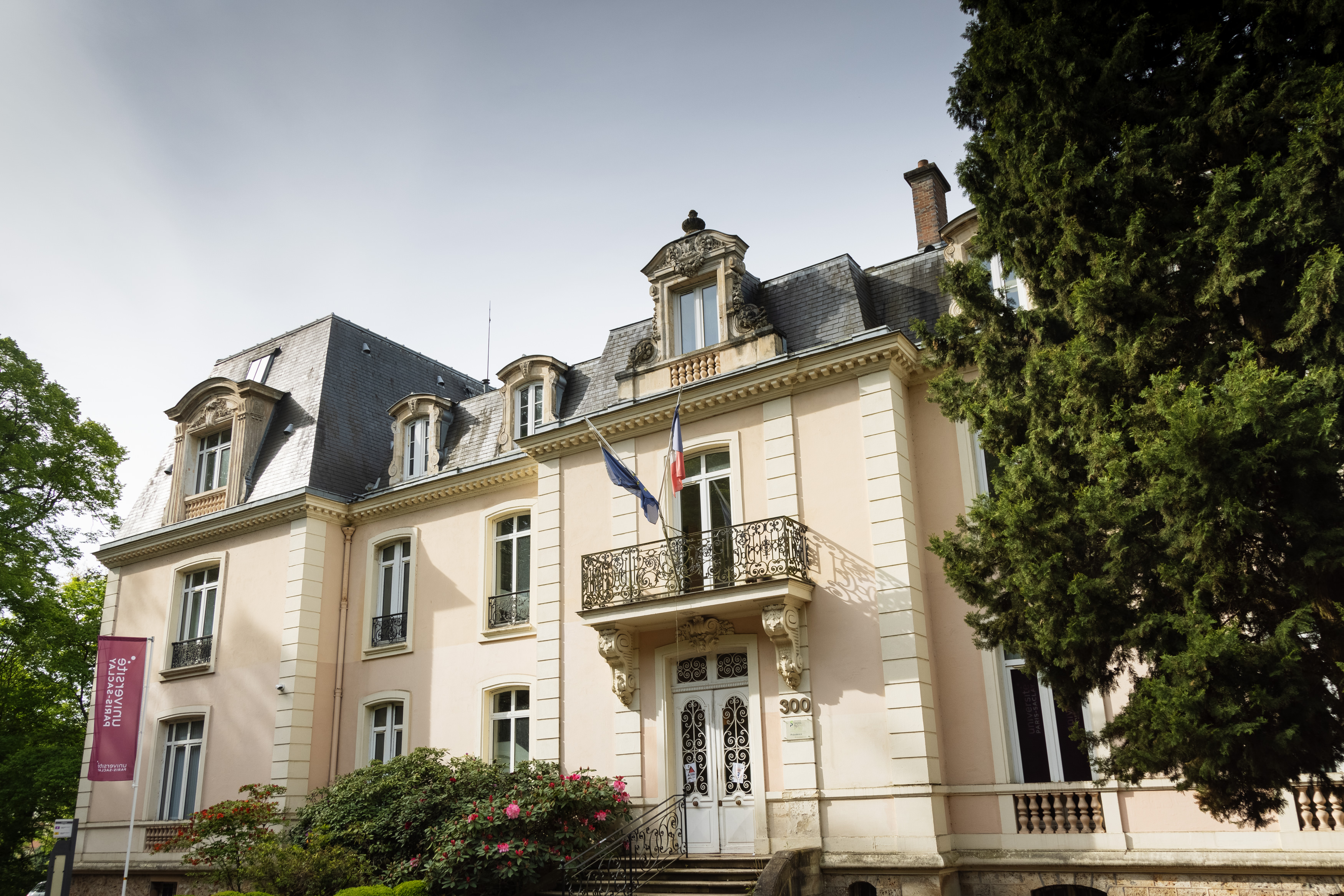
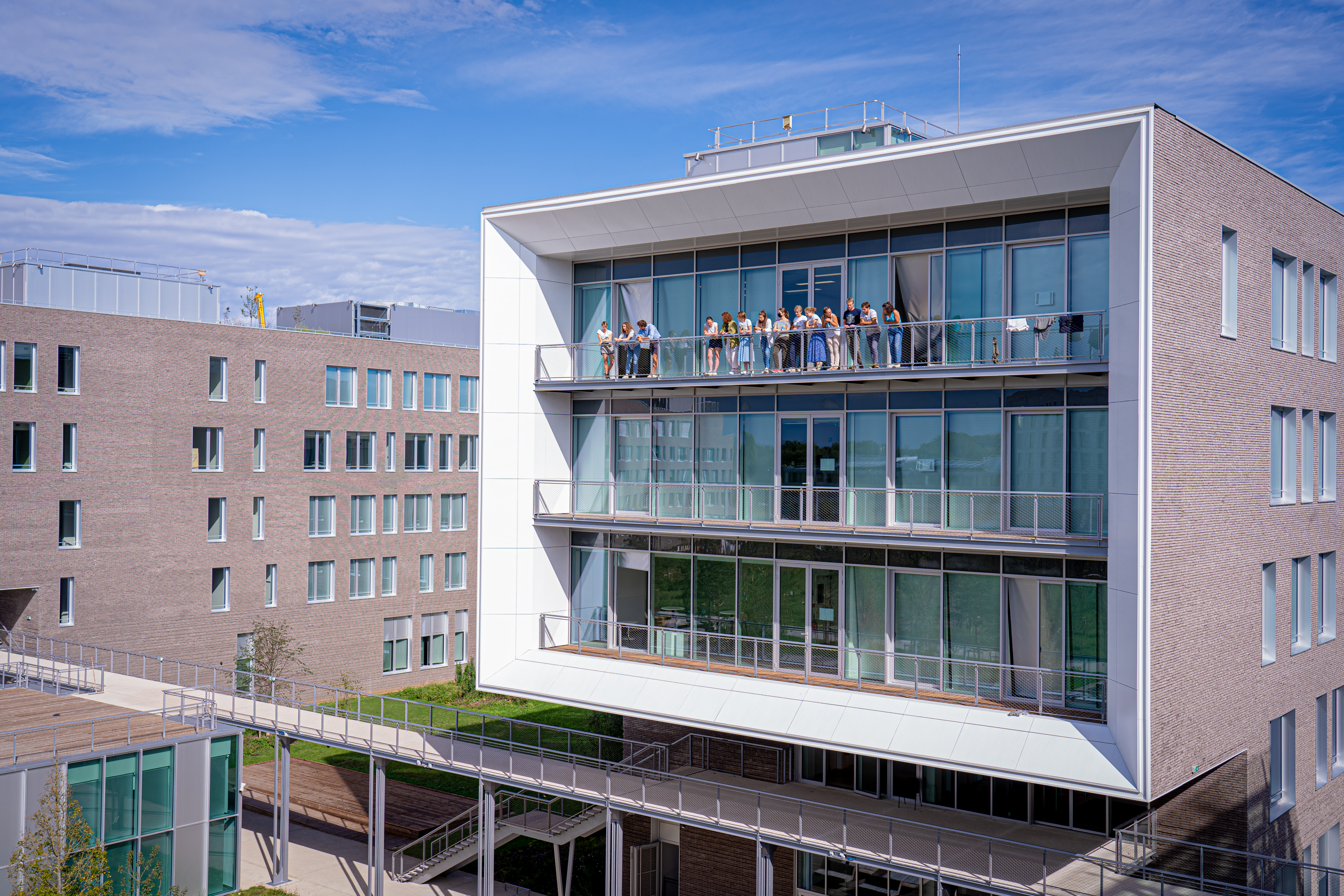
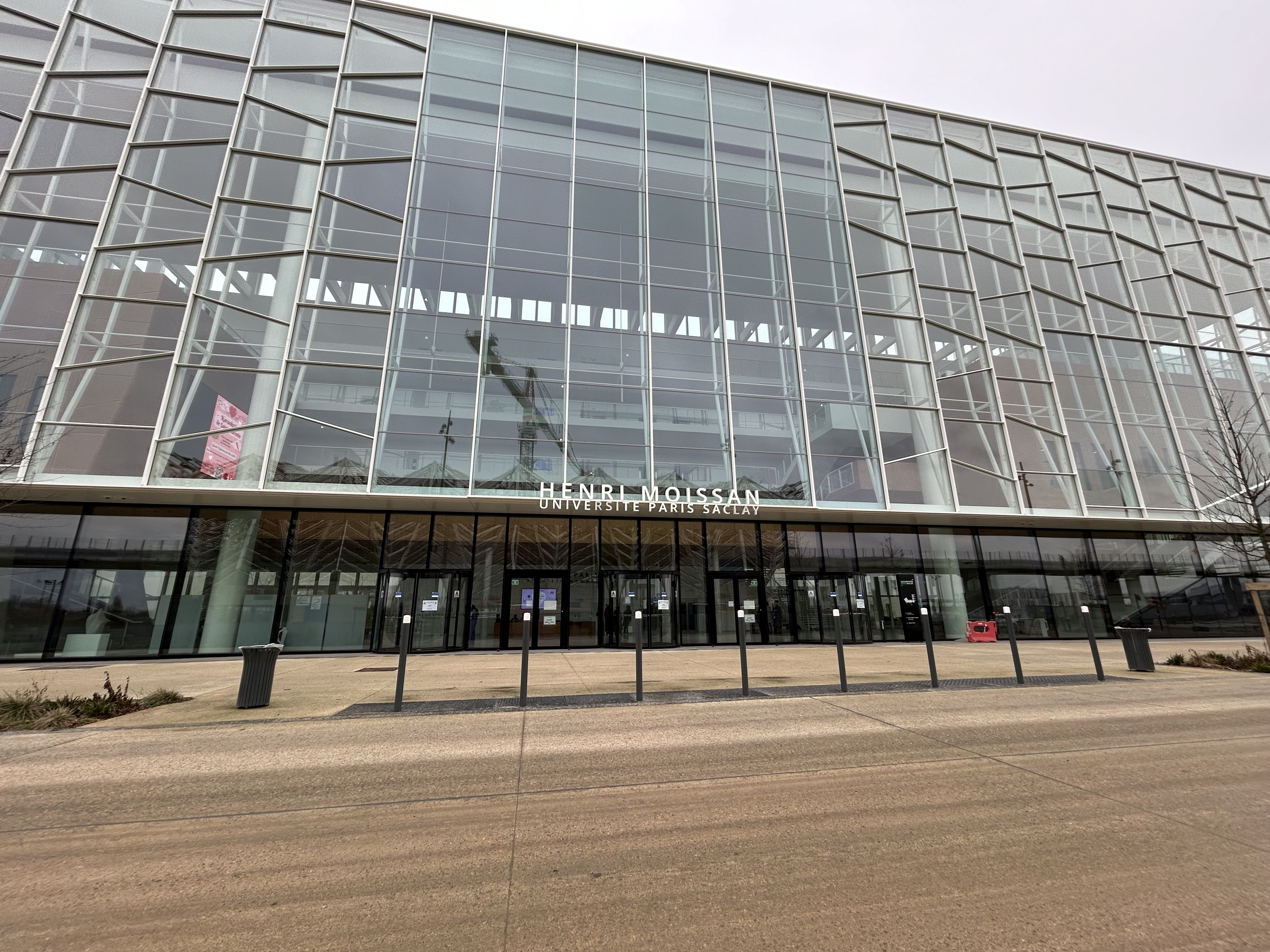
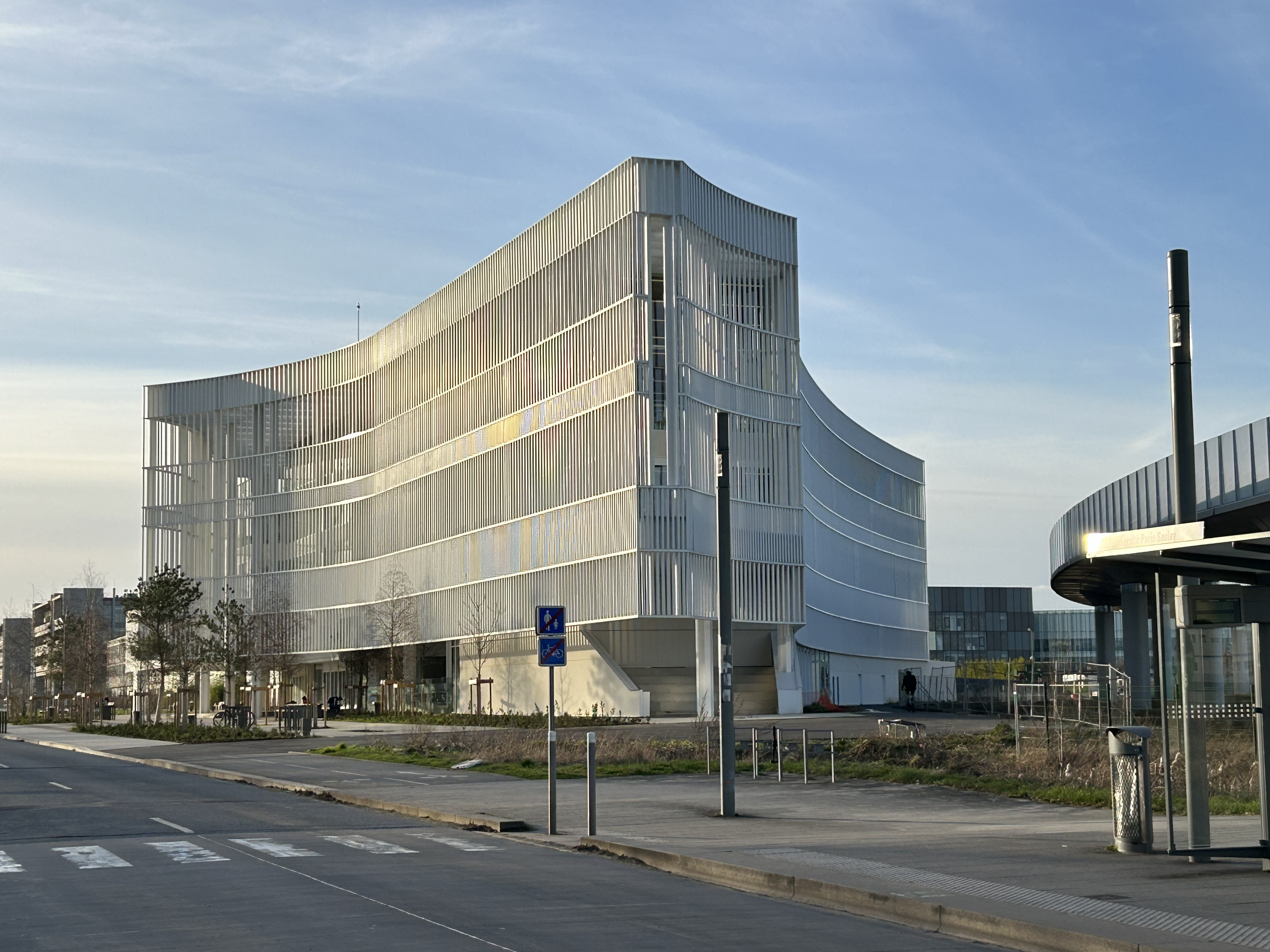
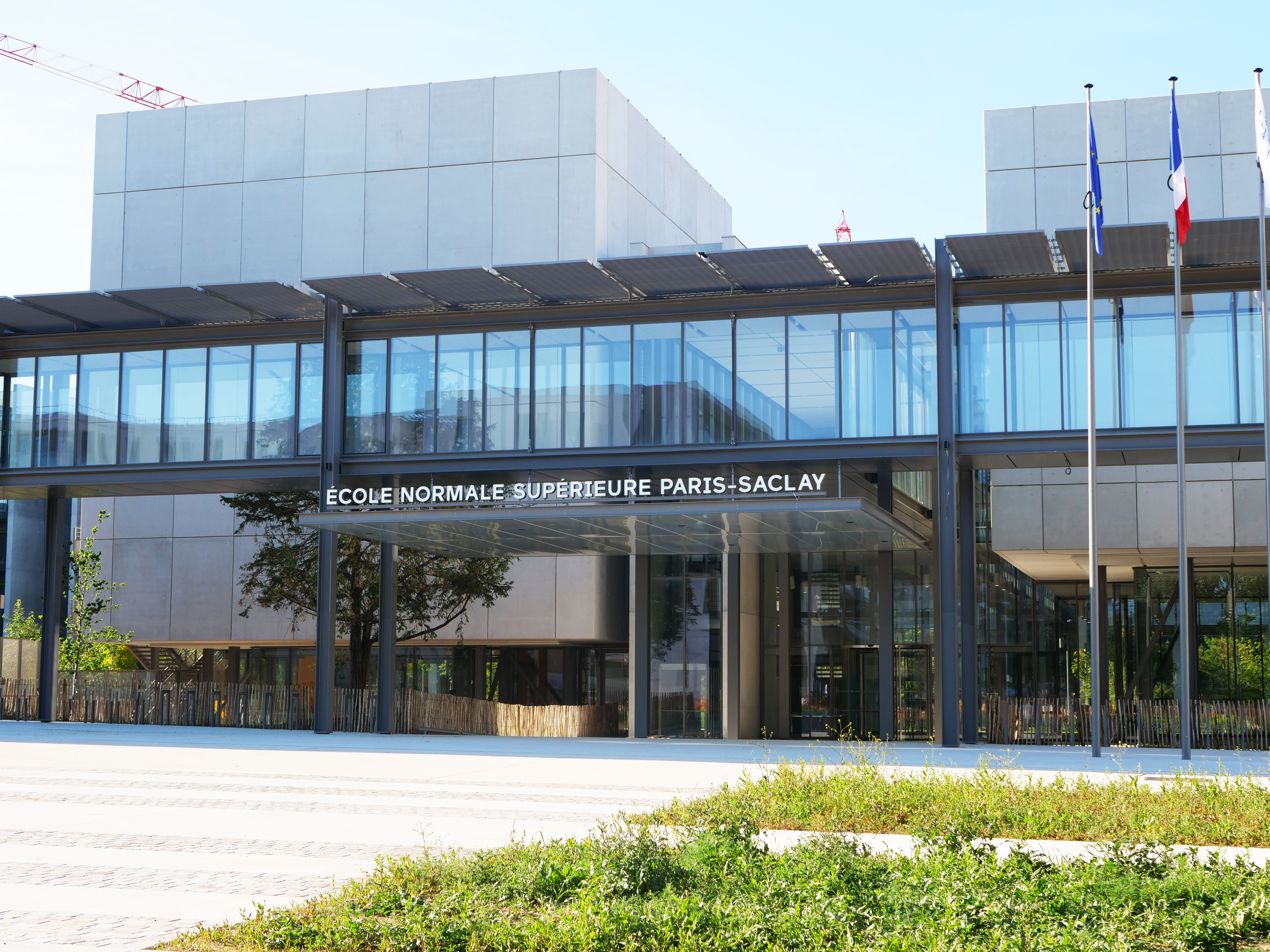
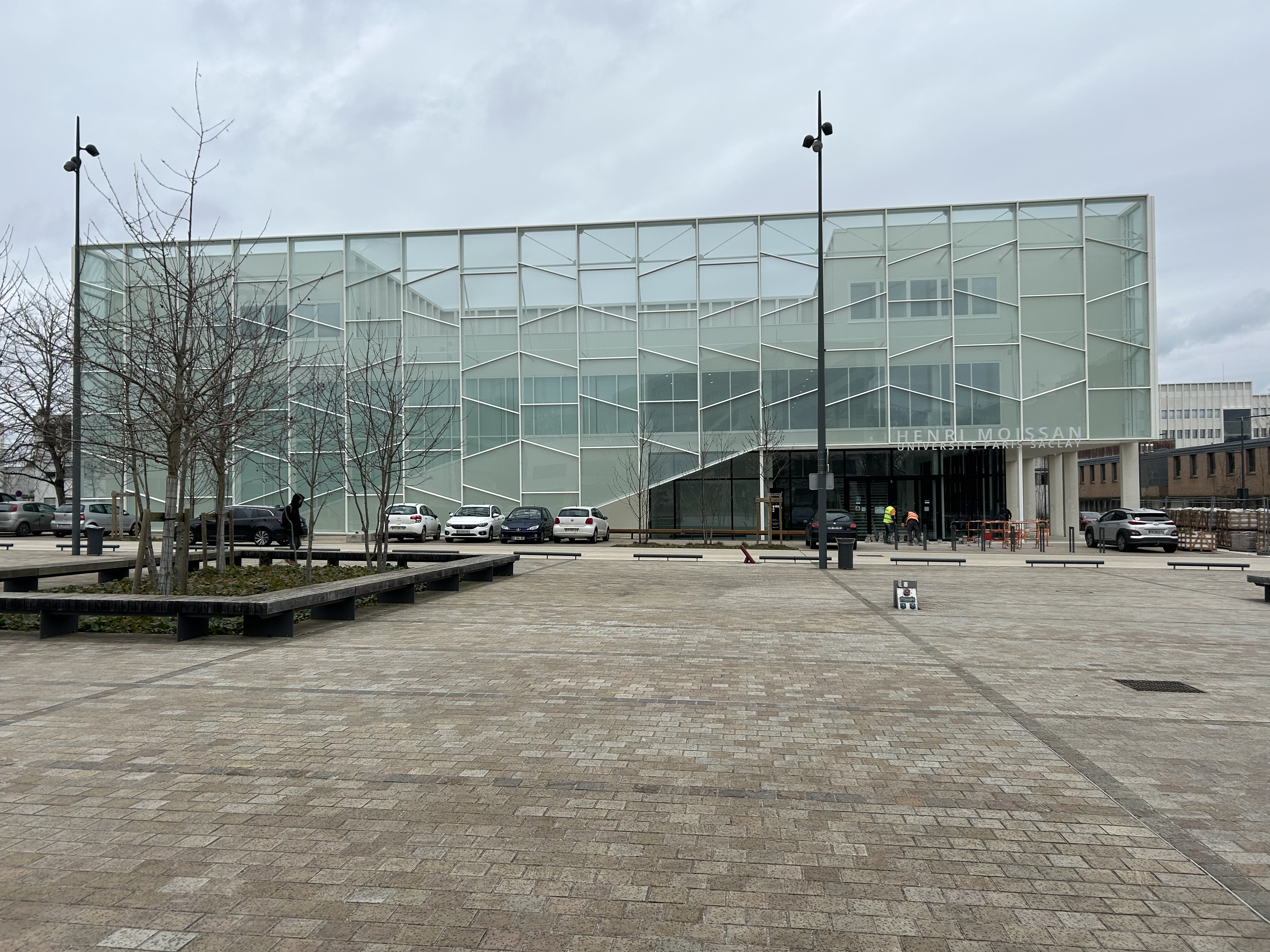
- Former names: University of Paris Sud XI; Paris Faculty of Sciences in Orsay
- Type: Public research university
- Established: c. 1150 University of Paris; 1956 University of Paris in Orsay; 1971 Paris-Sud University; 2014 As a community 2019 As a collegiate university, that replaces Paris-Sud University
- Affiliations: Chancellery of the Universities of Paris; Udice Group
- Chancellor: Bernard Beignier (Chancellor of the universities of Paris)
- President: Camille Galap
- Faculty: 10,500
- Students: 60,000
- Undergraduates: 5,400
- Postgraduates: 23,300
- Doctoral students: 6,000
- Location: Orsay, Île-de-France, France; 48.7117343°N 2.1712888°E
- Campus: 200 hectares (490 acres); Midsize city
- Website: universite-paris-saclay.fr

Paris-Saclay University (French: Université Paris-Saclay, pronounced [ynivɛʁsite paʁi saklɛ]) is a combined technological research institute and public research university in Orsay, France. Paris-Saclay was established in 2019 after the merger of four technical grandes écoles, as well as several technological institutes, engineering schools, and research facilities; giving it fifteen constituent colleges with over 48,000 students combined.

With the merger, the French government has explicitly voiced their wish to rival top American technological research institutes, such as MIT. The university has over 275 laboratories in particle physics, nuclear physics, astrophysics, atomic physics and molecular physics, condensed matter physics, theoretical physics, electronics, nanoscience and nanotechnology. It is part of the larger Paris-Saclay cluster, which is a research-intensive academic campus encompassing Paris-Saclay University, the Polytechnic Institute of Paris, combined with a business cluster for high-technology corporations. Paris-Saclay notably also includes the Institut des Hautes Études Scientifiques, where many contributions to the development of modern mathematics have been made, among them modern algebraic geometry and catastrophe theory.

Paris-Saclay has two main campuses: the 495-acre Plateau urban campus, straddling Orsay, Gif-sur-Yvette and Palaiseau (with the Campus Agro Paris-Saclay) and centered on the Quartier de Moulon; and the historic campus in the valley, centered around the Château de Launay, the university's former headquarters. It also has several decentralized campuses, such as the medical campus in Bicêtre Hospital at Kremlin-Bicêtre, and the law faculty campus at Sceaux. The University of Versailles and the University of Évry, both part of Paris-Saclay, have campuses in Versailles, Guyancourt, Vélizy-Villacoublay, Saint-Germain-en-Laye and Évry-Courcouronnes.

As of 2026, 13 Fields Medalists and 5 Nobel Prize winners have been affiliated with the university and its associated research institutes.

== History ==
In 2019, the Paris-Saclay University succeeded University of Paris-Sud founded in 1971, which itself succeeded to University of Paris (in Orsay), founded c. 1150.

The Paris-Saclay University was established in 2015 as a universities community (ComUE) and in 2019 as a collegiate university, with the aim to become a top-ranking, research-focused French university.

=== 20th century ===
==== University of Paris research centres in Orsay, on the Saclay plateau ====
After World War II, the rapid growth of nuclear physics and chemistry meant that research needed more and more powerful accelerators, which required large areas. The University of Paris, the École Normale Supérieure and the Collège de France looked for space in the south of Paris near Orsay.

As early as the 1940s, the French physicists Irène Joliot-Curie and Frédéric Joliot-Curie, professors at the Faculty of Science at the University of Paris, had already envisaged decentralising the university to the southern suburbs of Paris, near Versailles. In 1942, Irène Joliot-Curie even informed the university's rector of the existence of a potential site near Orsay, on the Saclay plateau.

In the 1950s, a number of Grandes Ecoles and university research departments were set up in the immediate vicinity of the Saclay plateau. In 1954, France decided to combine its participation in CERN with the development of its own nuclear physics research.

In 1955, the University of Paris moved into the Saclay plateau with the purchase of 50 hectares of land in Orsay. Irène Joliot-Curie proposed the creation of the Orsay Institute of Nuclear Physics, and construction work began in 1955. She died in 1956, and Frédéric became the Institute's first director. At the same time, the Orsay Linear Accelerator Laboratory (LAL) of the University of Paris was built.

The rapid increase of students and the teaching situation at the Sorbonne (the main campus of the University of Paris) was becoming increasingly critical. So in 1958 it was decided to transfer some of the science teaching at the University of Paris to Orsay.

==== The University of Paris-Sud ====
In 1965, the Orsay science campus officially became independent from the University of Paris. After being the Orsay Faculty of Sciences of the University of Paris, separate from the Paris Faculty of Sciences, it became a full university, the University of Paris-Sud (Paris XI) in 1971. The Faculty of Sciences was joined by the Faculty of Medicine at Kremlin-Bicêtre, the Jean Monnet Faculty of Law and Economics at Sceaux and the Faculty of Pharmacy at Châtenay-Malabry, creating a multidisciplinary university in the south of Paris.

=== 21st century ===
==== The Campus Paris-Saclay scientific cooperation foundation (FCS) ====
In 2007, a research and higher education hub was created in Orsay and Saclay. The hub has three founding members: the University of Paris-Sud, the University of Versailles and the École normale supérieure de Cachan, the future ‘ENS Paris-Saclay’.

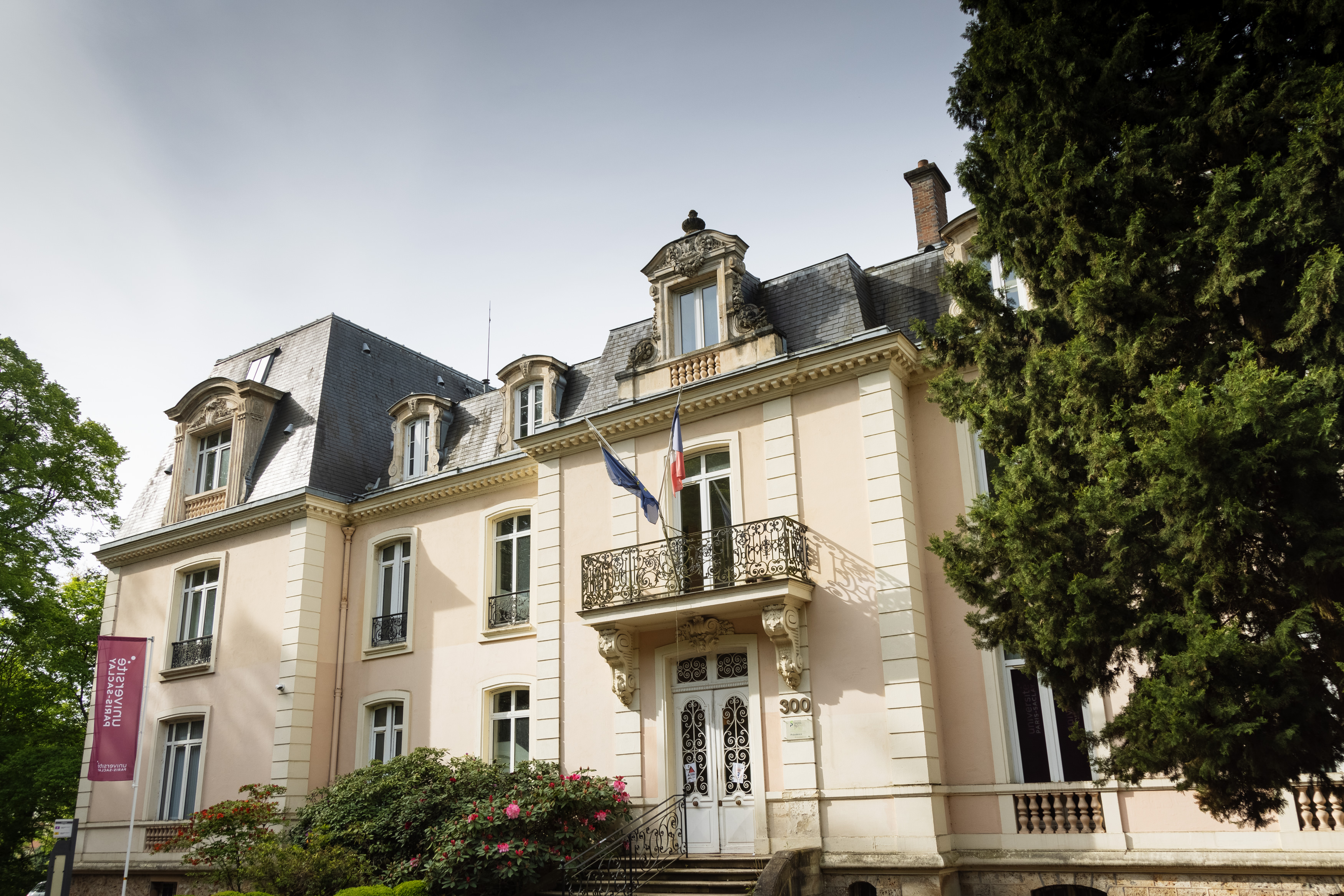
The Château de Launay, former headquarters of the university, at Orsay, in June 2021.

In 2008, the University of Paris-Sud and the University of Versailles were among the 21 winning institutions of the France's Plan Campus, with which the Saclay research and higher education hub is associated. These institutions then embarked on a larger-scale cooperation, namely the creation of a collegiate university: the Université Paris-Saclay. The university project was launched following its validation by the French Ministry of Higher Education and Research as part of the Campus Plan.

The Campus Paris-Saclay scientific cooperation foundation, chaired at the time by Alain Bravo, was set up to bring together the various academic and scientific establishments, manage the Digiteo and Triangle de la physique advanced research thematic networks (RTRA) and create the community. With the planned development of the Paris-Saclay technology hub, many institutions are planning to move there.

==== The university system 'Université Paris-Saclay' ====
In 2014, the various members adopted the statutes of the Paris-Saclay University system (ComUE), enabling it to award bachelor's, master's and doctoral degrees. Ultimately, the university system is to become a full university.

The university system's first academic year started in September 2015.

To be recognized as an entity of sufficient size and quality, the university regroups some of the top grandes écoles in France with public universities under a single campus on the Saclay plateau. Each member institution will remain independent but share a significant portion of existing and newly invested resources. This follows a model similar to the one adopted by University of Oxford and Cambridge, where each constituent college keeps its independence while being grouped under a 'university'. According to Dominique Vernay, chairman of the foundation developing Paris-Saclay, the university aims at a top-ten position in the Academic Ranking of World Universities (ARWU), but "the first goal is to be the top university in continental Europe".

Confronted with disagreements between its members (between the schools and universities, or between their supervisory ministries), the project stagnated, as the Cour des Comptes noted in its report of 8 February 2017, pointing in particular to a lack of housing and transport facilities, as well as a lack of strategic vision, despite the five billion euros planned (committed or envisaged). In 2017, the University of Paris-Sud proposed merging with the university system (ComUE) to create the Paris-Saclay University as a collegiate university, and integrating the schools into the future institution as component institutions. This stalemate led President Emmanuel Macron to announce on 25 October 2017, during his inauguration of CentraleSupélec's new buildings at Paris-Saclay, the separation of the various members into two university entities: the Paris-Saclay University and the Polytechnic Institute of Paris.

On 25 October 2017, French President Emmanuel Macron inaugurated the new Orsay Graduate School of Mathematics, which brings together the mathematics laboratory teams of the Paris-Saclay University and the CNRS, some of the teaching staff, and the Jacques Hadamard University Library.

==== The collegiate university ====
School	Founded
Life sciences (AgroParisTech)	1826
Engineering (CentraleSupélec)	1829
Education (ENS)	1892
Optics (IOGS)	1917
Sciences	1956
Law and Management	1968
Medicine	1971
Pharmacy	1972
Sports Sciences	1985
Engineering	2004
Undergraduate University School	2019

In January 2020, it replaced University of Paris-Sud and in 2025, University of Versailles and University of Evry will merge with it as well. They should evolve towards the status of an ‘integrated university’, and be renamed Paris-Saclay University in Versailles and Paris-Saclay University in Évry.

Every year since 2020, Paris-Saclay has achieved its best performance in the Shanghai rankings, ranking 1st in the world in mathematics and 9th in physics.

In April 2022, the Paris-Saclay University inaugurated the new 'Agro Paris-Saclay Campus', which covers 4.2 hectares in the commune of Palaiseau, near Orsay. It will be hosting nearly 2,000 students and 1,350 teacher-researchers, researchers, technicians and staff from the AgroParisTech Grande École of the Paris-Saclay University.

On 18 April 2023, Paris-Saclay University opened France's largest academic research hub for pharmaceuticals, the Henri-Moissan Centre, bringing together its School of Pharmacy, its chemistry and biology departments and the Orsay Institute of Molecular Chemistry and Materials in a single centre. More than 3,000 students and 1,000 researchers-teachers and administrative staff have gradually moved in since the start of the new academic year in September 2022.

Since October 2023, the university has been a partner of the French private Grande École IPSA for double degrees in aerospace.

In February 2024, Paris-Saclay, which brings together nearly 50,000 students, is facing a leadership crisis. The Board of Administrators has still not been able to elect its future chairman and has been under the supervision of a provisional administrator for several months. After several months of crisis, the former provisional administrator Camille Galap was elected to head the flagship French university on 11 June 2024, with the promise of getting the institution out of the institutional difficulties it is going through. Indeed, the greater presence of qualified external figures on the board of directors, than representatives of teachers, researchers or students, has caused an institutional blockage. A situation made possible because of the university's exceptional statuses.

== Organisation ==
The Paris-Saclay University consists of five faculties in Sciences, Medicine, Pharmacy, Law-Economics-Management, and Sports Sciences; an Engineering school; three technical institutes specialised in scientific and technical subjects in Cachan, Orsay, and Sceaux; and an undergraduate university school.

The university also brings together four grandes écoles: CentraleSupélec, AgroParisTech, ENS Paris-Saclay and the Institut d'Optique Graduate School, with two associate institutions: Versailles Saint-Quentin-en-Yvelines University (UVSQ) and University of Évry Val d'Essonne (UEVE).

It combines resources from the following French universities and grandes écoles, as well as partial resources from various research organizations and the Systematic Paris-Region cluster:

Initially, the community of universities also included five other grandes écoles: École Polytechnique, Télécom Paris, Telecom SudParis, ENSTA Paris and ENSAE Paris. However, due to differences in University set-up, these five grandes écoles created their own separate university Polytechnic Institute of Paris. This was announced by French President Emmanuel Macron during a speech in Paris-Saclay. Both of these clusters plan to co-operate and they engage in organization of several master's degrees with the Paris-Saclay University.

=== Faculties and Institutes ===
Name		Foundation		Academic degree	Field	Students	Campus	Teaching language
Paris-Saclay Undergraduate University School (École Universitaire de Premier Cycle Paris-Saclay)	Orsay IUT	1971	2019	Undergraduate	Law, Economics, and Science	13,000	Paris-Saclay Campus, Guyancourt, Sceaux, Cachan, Évry-Courcouronnes	French
Paris-Saclay Undergraduate University School (École Universitaire de Premier Cycle Paris-Saclay)	Sceaux IUT	1970	2019	Undergraduate	Law, Economics, and Science	13,000	Paris-Saclay Campus, Guyancourt, Sceaux, Cachan, Évry-Courcouronnes	French
Paris-Saclay Undergraduate University School (École Universitaire de Premier Cycle Paris-Saclay)	Cachan IUT	1971	2019	Undergraduate	Law, Economics, and Science	13,000	Paris-Saclay Campus, Guyancourt, Sceaux, Cachan, Évry-Courcouronnes	French
Paris-Saclay Faculty of Sciences		1956 and 1971		Double Licence diploma (a selective bachelor's degree) and postgraduate	Science	10,000	Paris-Saclay Campus	French, English
Paris-Saclay Faculty of Law, Economics and Management		1968		Double Licence diploma (a selective bachelor's degree) and postgraduate	Law and economics	6,000	Sceaux	French, English
Paris-Saclay Faculty of Pharmacy		1972		Double Licence diploma (a selective bachelor's degree) and postgraduate	Medicine	3,500	Paris-Saclay Campus	French, English
Paris-Saclay Medical School		1971		Double Licence diploma (a selective bachelor's degree) and postgraduate	Medicine	3,400	Le Kremlin-Bicêtre, Paris-Saclay Campus	French, English
Paris-Saclay Faculty of Sports Sciences		1985		Double Licence diploma (a selective bachelor's degree) and postgraduate	Science	1,500	Paris-Saclay Campus	French, English
Polytech Paris-Saclay		2004		Double Licence diploma (a selective bachelor's degree) and postgraduate	Engineering	820	Paris-Saclay Campus	French, English

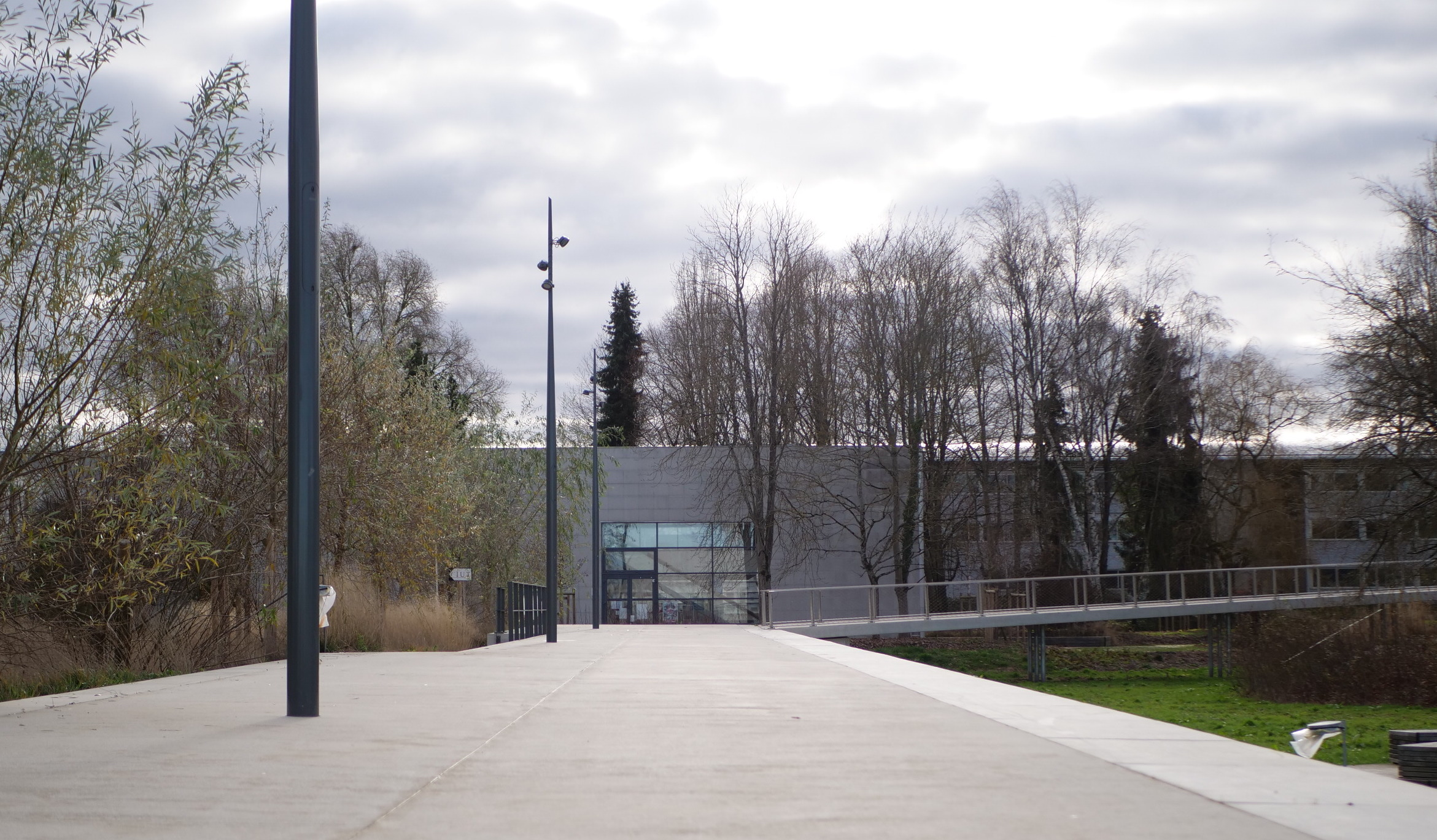
Orsay University Institute of Technology

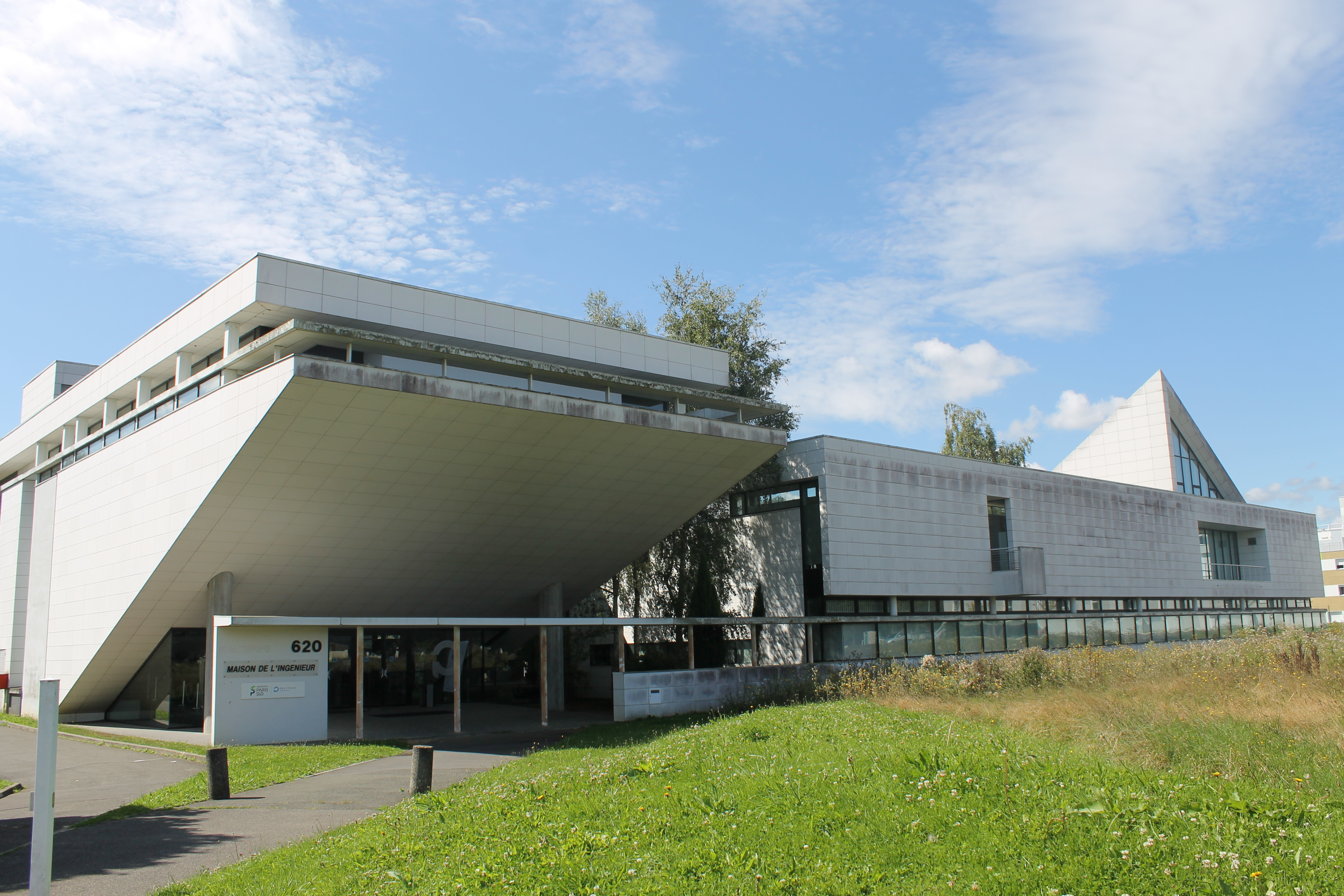
Paris-Saclay Polytechnic School

=== Grandes Écoles and graduate schools ===
	Name	Foundation	Field	Students	Campus
Grandes Écoles	AgroParisTech	1826	Life sciences	2,420	Paris-Saclay Campus
Grandes Écoles	CentraleSupélec	2015	Science and Engineering	5,350	Paris-Saclay Campus, Rennes, Metz
Grandes Écoles	ENS Paris-Saclay	1892	Science	1,360	Paris-Saclay Campus
Grandes Écoles	Institut d'optique Graduate School	1917	Optics	440	Paris-Saclay Campus
Graduate schools	Paris-Saclay Graduate School of Law	2019	Law		Guyancourt, Sceaux
Graduate schools	Paris-Saclay Graduate School of Physics	2019	Physics		Paris-Saclay Campus, Versailles, Évry-Courcouronnes
Graduate schools	Paris-Saclay Graduate School of Economics and Management	2019	Economics		Guyancourt, Sceaux
Graduate schools	Institute of Light Sciences	2019	Science		Paris-Saclay Campus
Graduate schools	Paris-Saclay Graduate School of Life Sciences and Health	2019	Life Sciences and Health		Paris-Saclay Campus, Le Kremlin-Bicêtre
Graduate schools	Paris-Saclay Graduate School of Mathematics	2019	Mathematics		Paris-Saclay Campus
Graduate schools	Paris-Saclay Graduate School of Sociology and Political science	2019	Politics and sociology		Guyancourt, Sceaux
Graduate schools	Paris-Saclay Graduate School of Engineering and Systems science	2019	Science and engineering		Paris-Saclay Campus
Graduate schools	Paris-Saclay Graduate School of Computer Science	2019	Science and engineering		Paris-Saclay Campus

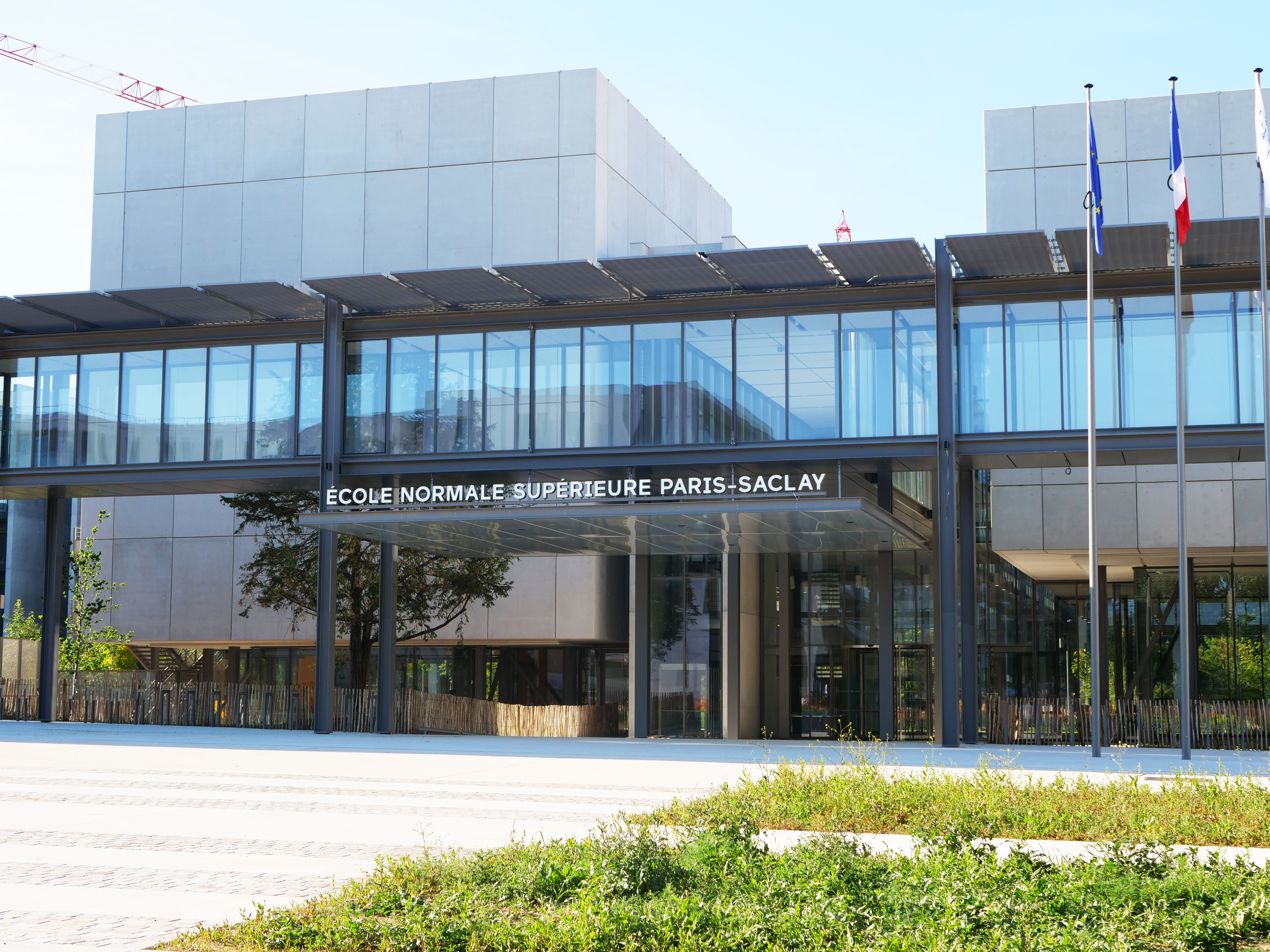
ENS Paris-Saclay

=== Associated universities ===
Name	Foundation	Academic degree	Field	Students	Campus
University of Versailles Saint-Quentin-en-Yvelines	1987 and 1991	Undergraduate and postgraduate	Science, social science and life science	19,000	Versailles, Montigny-le-Bretonneux, Guyancourt
University of Évry Paris-Saclay	1991	Undergraduate and postgraduate	Science, social science and life science	10,500	Évry-Courcouronnes

=== Research organizations ===
The following research organizations have established research centers within the Paris-Saclay University. The resources contributed by these organizations will remain largely independent from other member institutions. Once the University of Paris-Saclay is fully integrated, its research centers are expected to achieve a profile similar to the Jet Propulsion Laboratory of Caltech:

- CEA (Atomic Energy and Alternative Energies Commission)
- CNRS (French National Centre for Scientific Research)
- Inria (French Institute for Research in Computer Science and Automation)
- INSERM (French Institute of Health and Medical Research)
- Institut des Hautes Études Scientifiques (Institute of Advanced Scientific Studies)
- INRA (French National Institute for Agricultural Sciences)
- ONERA (National Board of Study and Aerospace Research)
- SOLEIL (national synchrotron facility)
- Pascal Institute – University of Paris-Saclay
- Institute of Theoretical Physics
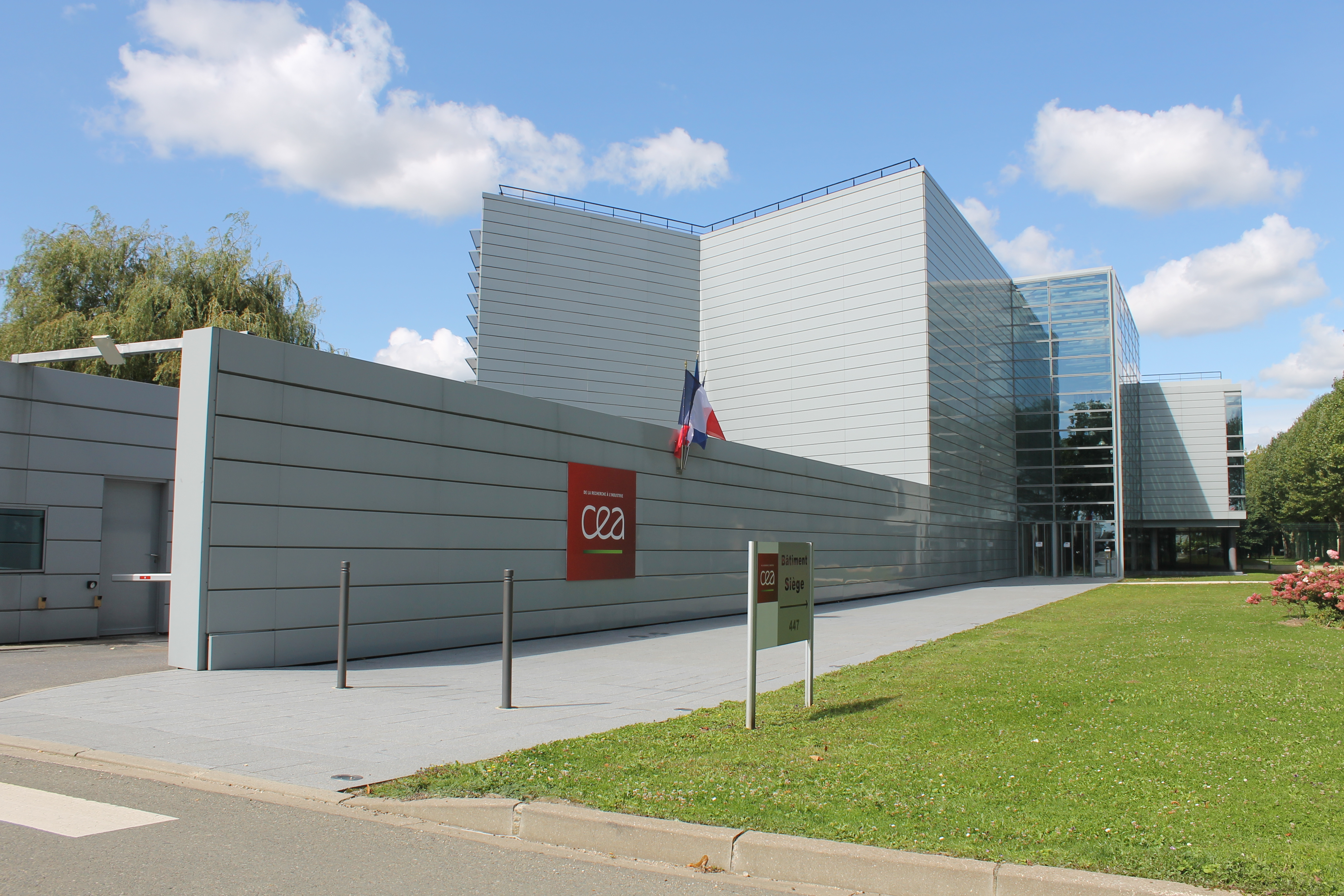
CEA

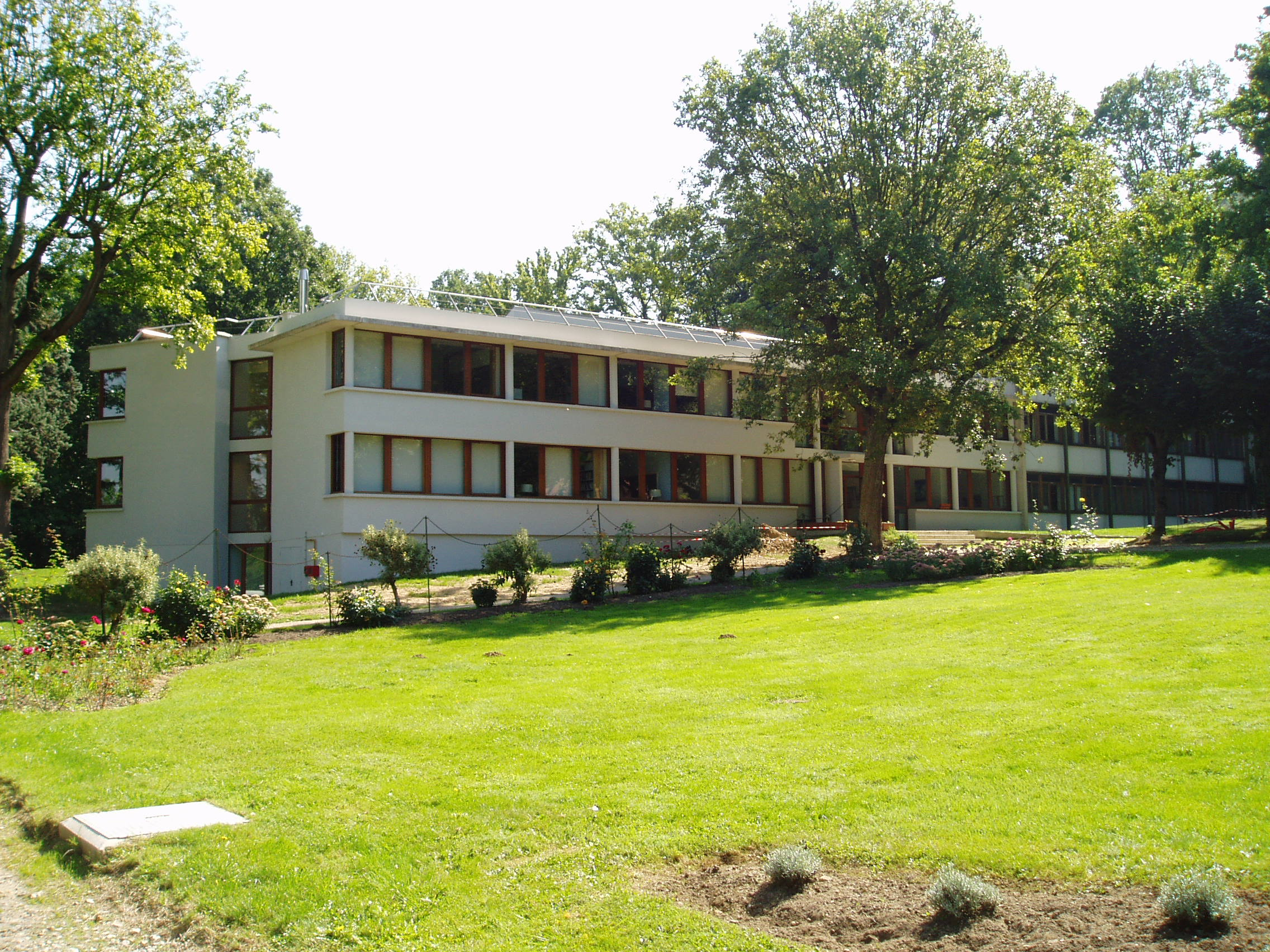
IHES

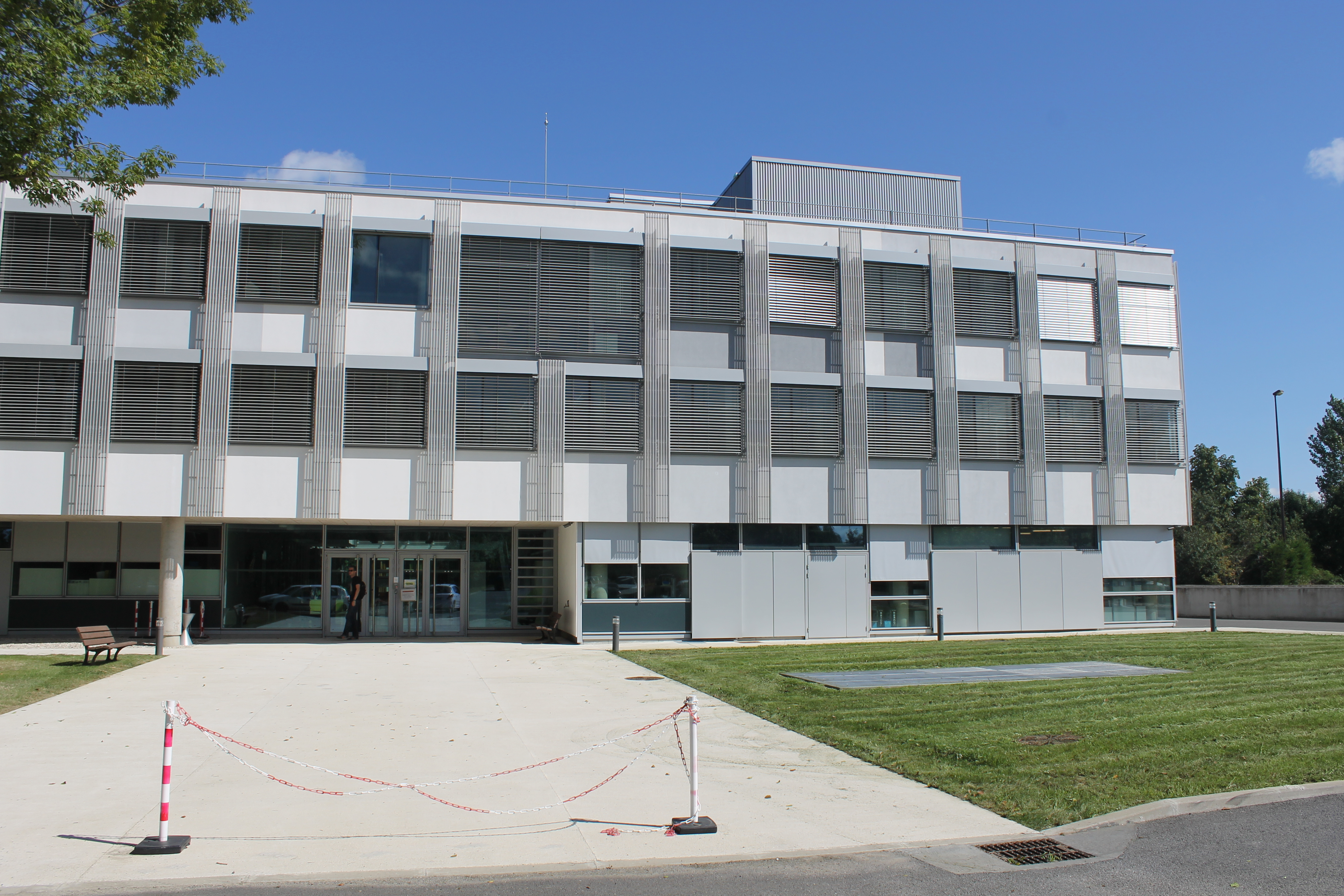
INRIA

== Campuses ==
=== Orsay ===
==== The Plateau ====
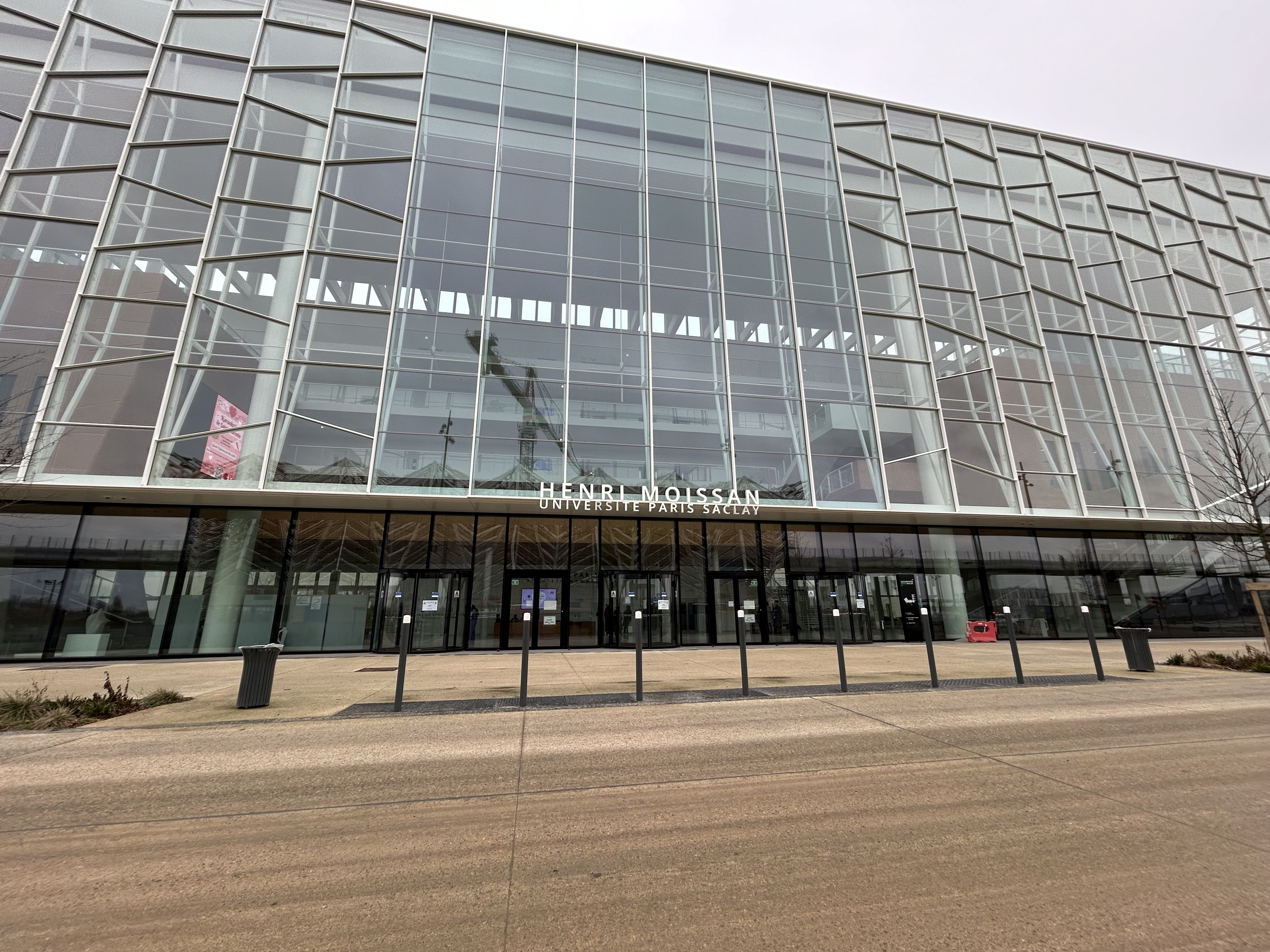
The Henri Moissan building, on the Saclay Plateau, which houses the Faculty of Pharmacy and the Biology and Chemistry departments of the Faculty of Sciences of the university.

The main Paris-Saclay campus, covering 495 acres (200 ha), is centered on the Saclay Plateau and its Quartier de Moulon ("the Urban Campus") in Orsay, around 20 km south of downtown Paris, and extends into the surrounding areas of Gif-sur-Yvette and Palaiseau. The Plateau is home to the new buildings of the Faculty of Pharmacy, the departments of chemistry, biology and physics of the Faculty of Sciences, The Lumen, the university's main library, the École normale supérieure, the CentraleSupélec engineering grande école.

The adjacent areas of the Plateau, in the neighboring commune of Palaiseau, include the main buildings of AgroParisTech, the university's Institute of Life Sciences and Industries and the Environment, and the university's Center for Nanosciences and Nanotechnologies (C2N).

==== The Valley ====
Also, the campus historically extends to the south of the Bois de la Guyonnerie, in the Valley. Close to the city center of Orsay and the RER station Orsay-Ville, the Valley campus is centered around the Château de Launay. It houses the other departments of the Faculty of Sciences, the university science libraries such as Hadamard Library, and the main laboratories.

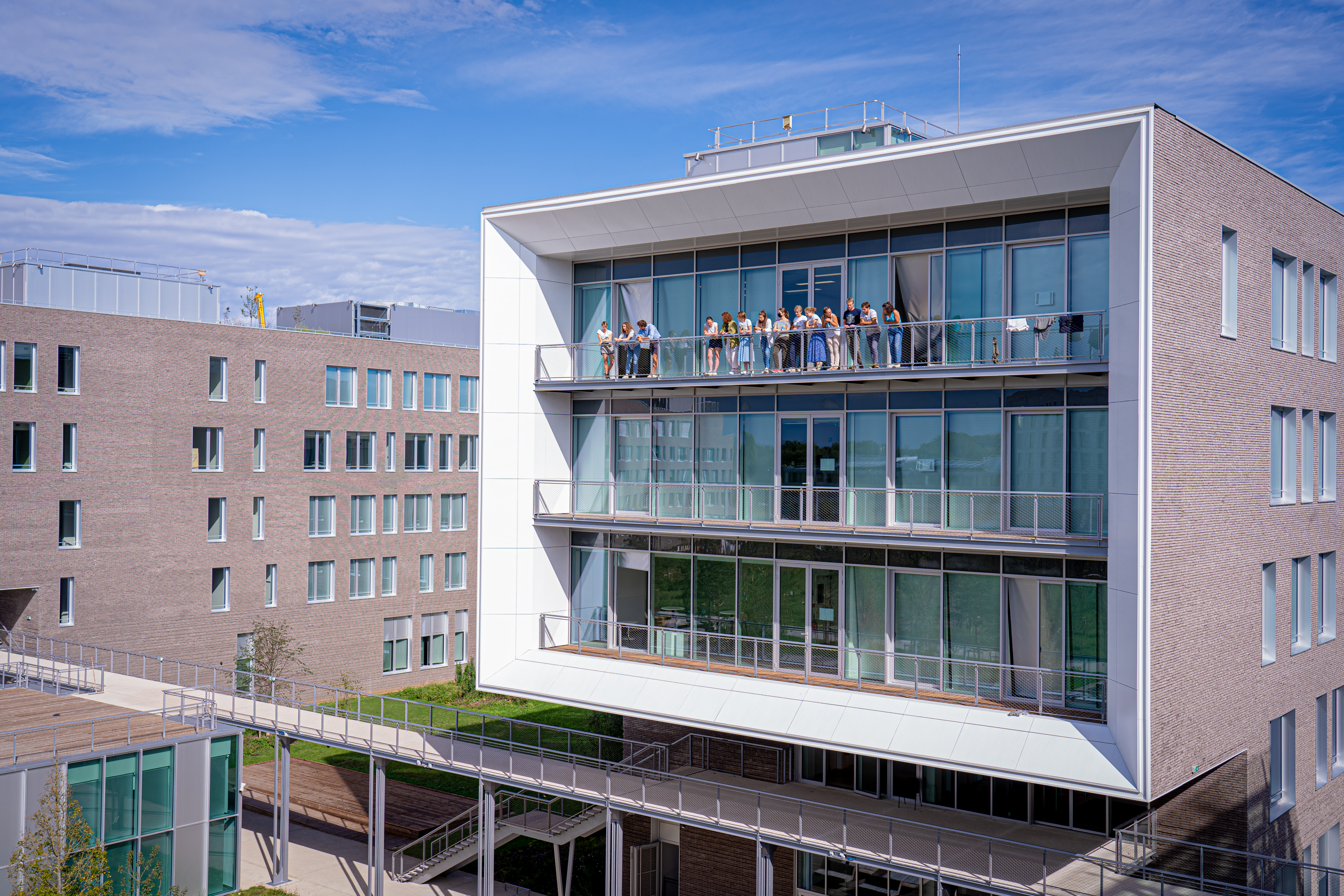
The building of the university's Agro Campus, on the Saclay Plateau, in the town of Palaiseau.

=== Other campuses ===
==== Sceaux ====
J. Monnet Law School is located on a 4.5-acre campus in the town of Sceaux, 6 kilometers south of Paris. It is the successor to the University of Paris's Sceaux Center for Legal Studies, which opened in 1968. A few meters to the south is the IUT of Sceaux, a professional school of the university which offers bachelor's level programs very focused on practice.

==== Bicêtre ====
The Faculty of Medicine is located on the site of the Bicêtre University Hospital, a few meters from the metro station Hôpital Bicêtre. It has historic buildings and a new 8,000 square meter building dedicated to research.

== Academic programs ==
Each member school of the Paris-Saclay University organizes training in a given scientific field. Depending on the needs of their registered program, a student enrolled in a particular graduate school will have access to academic resources from other schools.

The various fields of study available at Paris-Saclay University are broadly categorized into the following:

- Biodiversity, Agriculture and Food, Society, Environment (Biodiversité, Agriculture et Alimentation, Société, Environnement);
- Biology, Medicine, Pharmaceutical studies (Biologie, Médecine, Pharmacie);
- Law, Political Science (Droit et Science Politique);
- Humanities (Humanités);
- Engineering, Sciences and Information Technologies (Ingénierie, Sciences et Technologies de l'information);
- Sport and Human Motion Sciences (Sciences du Sport et du Mouvement Humain);
- Basic Sciences (Sciences Fondamentales);
- Social Sciences (Sciences Sociales).

The academic programs in each of the 8 schools is expected to follow the Anglo-American model:

- Paris-Saclay Undergraduate School – The Bachelor's program is provided by Paris-Saclay faculties and the 2 public universities within Paris-Saclay, which are Versailles-Saint-Quentin University and University of Évry Val-d'Essonne.
- Paris-Saclay Graduate Schools – Master's degrees are taught in both French and English. Altogether, 49 Master's degree are offered.
- Paris-Saclay Research or Doctoral Schools – PhD programs are offered through 20 doctoral schools. Doctoral degrees received after 30 September 2015, are awarded under the name "Paris-Saclay University", with a mention of the student's associated university or grande école.

=== Multidisciplinary Higher Education Program (CPES) Data Science, Society and Health ===
Paris-Saclay University is one of the three founding institutions of the Multidisciplinary Higher Education Program (CPES) Data Science, Society and Health, a university-specific degree created in the 2023 academic year. This selective program is offered jointly by Paris-Saclay University, the École normale supérieure Paris-Saclay, the Polytechnic Institute of Paris, and HEC Paris. It aims to train students capable of integrating data science, social sciences, and public health from an interdisciplinary perspective. Press release from the Polytechnic Institute of Paris ENS Paris-Saclay, partner of the new CPES

Recognized by the French Ministry of Higher Education, it confers the national grade de licence (bachelor’s level), awarded jointly by Université Paris-Saclay, Institut Polytechnique de Paris, and HEC Paris Decree No. 2023-937. CPES graduates will have access to prestigious postgraduate pathways in national or international master’s programs, engineering or business schools, or other grandes écoles tracks.

This three-year curriculum combines foundational training in mathematics, computer science, and statistics with courses in economics, social sciences, or biology, depending on the chosen specialization, as well as training on contemporary societal and health challenges. Paris-Saclay University presenting the CPES

Students attend courses across the three institutions and complete several applied interdisciplinary projects (Hi! PARIS, a social and solidarity entrepreneurial project during first and second years, and the HEC Capstone project in the final year).

== Research programmes ==
The Paris-Saclay University gathers together more than 300 research units, organized into 10 doctoral schools:

- Chemistry (Chimie)
- Electrical engineering, optics and electronics (EOE: Ingénierie électrique, optique et électronique)
- Mathematics (Mathématiques)
- Mechanics, energy and physical processes (MEP: Mécanique, énergétique et procédés)
- Subatomic physics and astrophysics (P2I: Physique des deux infinis)
- Wave and matter physics (PHOM: Physique des ondes et de la matière)
- Planetary science and cosmology (SPU: Sciences de la planète et de l'Univers)
- Life sciences (SDV: Sciences de la Vie)
- Human and social sciences (SHS: Sciences de l'Homme et de la Société)
- Information and communication sciences and technologies (STIC: Sciences et technologies de l'information et de la communication).

== University rankings ==
University rankings

Global – Overall
- ARWU World: 12 (Note: The three longest established and most influential global rankings) (2024)
- CWUR World: 32 (2023)
- CWTS World: 123 (2023)
- QS World: 73 (2025)
- THE World: 58 (2024)
- USNWR Global: 60 (2023)

National – Overall
- ARWU National: 1 (2024)
- CWTS National: 3 (2023)
- CWUR National: 2 (2023)
- QS National: 4 (2025)
- THE National: 2 (2024)
- USNWR National: 3 (2023)

The university is particularly recognized for its programs in Mathematics, Physics and Computer Science, which have received top rankings in several international university rankings such as QS World University Rankings, Times Higher Education World University Rankings, Academic Ranking of World Universities, U.S. News & World Report and many domestic magazines.

It is also connected with two grande écoles: École polytechnique and CentraleSupélec, which are known as the top 2 engineering schools in France.

In August 2024, Paris-Saclay University ranked 12th in Shanghai Ranking's top 1000 universities in the world, and 2nd worldwide for Mathematics by Academic Ranking of World Universities (ARWU) and 3rd worldwide for Physics (1st in Europe).

== Notable people ==
Paris-Saclay University formally replaced several pre-existing Parisian universities, grande écoles and research institutes. These continue to exist as departments within the broader structure of Paris-Saclay. The list below therefore includes those pre- and post-2019 laureates whose institutions were later subsumed by the university.

=== Nobel laureates ===
- 2026: Henri B. Kagan - PHD in symmetric catalysis - Nobel in Chemistry
- 2025: Philippe Aghion – Bachelor's in Mathematics, ENS Paris-Saclay - Nobel in Economics
- 2025: Michel Devoret – DEA, PhD - Nobel in Physics
- 2022: Alain Aspect – BA, PhD and professor, ENS Paris-Saclay, IOGS, Paris-Sud University - Nobel in Physics
- 2007: Albert Fert – Professor, Paris-Sud University (LPS, CNRS/Thales) – Nobel in Physics
- 1991: Pierre-Gilles de Gennes – Professor, CEA, Paris-Sud University (LPS) – Nobel in Physics
- 1935: Frédéric Joliot-Curie – Founder of the Orsay Faculty of Sciences, commissioner of the CEA – Nobel in Chemistry
- 1935: Irène Joliot-Curie – Founder of the Orsay Faculty of Sciences, commissioner of the CEA – Nobel in Chemistry

=== Fields medalists ===
- 2026: Hong Wang - Master and professor, IHES
- 2022: Hugo Duminil-Copin – Master and professor, IHES
- 2010: Cédric Villani – IHES-University of Lyon Chair
- 2010: Ngô Bảo Châu – PhD and professor, Paris-Sud University (IMO)
- 2006: Wendelin Werner – Professor – Paris-Sud University (IMO)
- 2002: Laurent Lafforgue – PhD and Professor – Paris-Sud University, IHES
- 1998: Maxim Kontsevich – Professor – IHES
- 1994: Jean-Christophe Yoccoz – PhD and professor, Paris-Sud University
- 1994: Jean Bourgain – Professor, IHES
- 1982: Alain Connes – Professor, IHES
- 1978: Pierre Deligne – PhD and professor, Paris-Sud University
- 1966: Alexandre Grothendieck – Professor, IHES
- 1958: René Thom – Professor, IHES

== See also ==
- List of medieval universities
- List of public universities in France by academy
- Campus of the Paris-Saclay University
- Paris-Saclay Medical School
- Polytechnic Institute of Paris
