= Paris-Saclay Medical School =

Medical school in France

Coordinates: 42.335743°N 71.105138°W

- Faculté de médecine de l'université Paris-Saclay
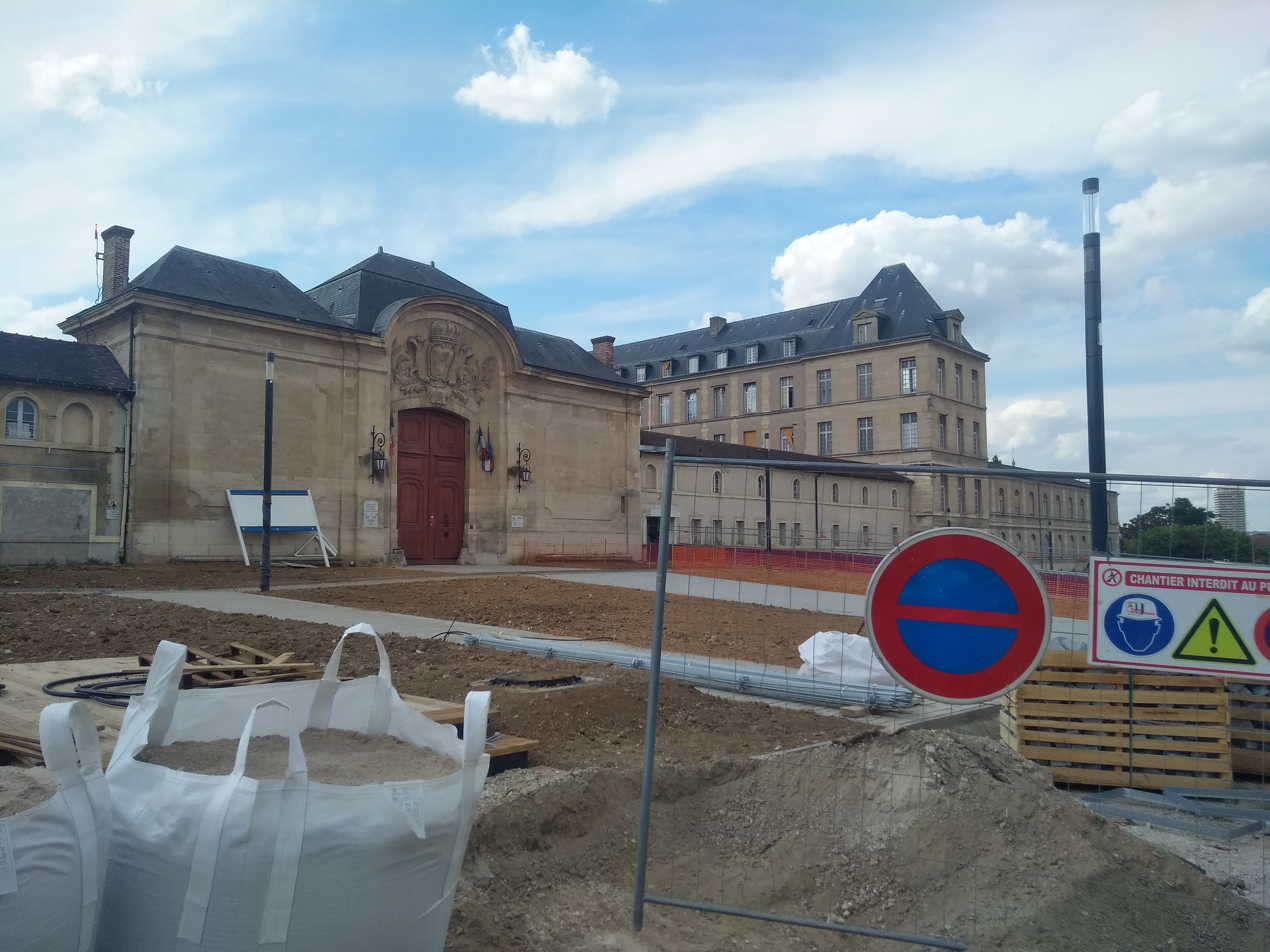
- Kremlin-Bicêtre - travaux devant l'hôpital de Bicêtre
- Type: Public
- Established: 1968
- Parent institution: Paris-Saclay University
- Dean: Didier Samuel
- Academic staff: 303
- Students: 4,800
- Location: Le Kremlin-Bicêtre, Île-de-France, France
- Website: www.medecine.universite-paris-saclay.fr

Paris-Saclay Medical School, also Faculté de médecine Paris-Saclay in French, is the graduate medical school of Paris-Saclay University and is located in the Bicêtre Medical Area of Le Kremlin-Bicêtre, Val-de-Marne, France and founded in 1968. It is the medical school of the first university in France according to its dean.

== History ==
Created by decree in 1968, the Paris-Saclay Faculty of Medicine saw its walls being built within the hospital grounds of Bicêtre in 1980. It is one of the 7 faculties of medicine in the Paris region.

On July 14, 2020, a study by researchers from the Paris-Saclay Medical School on a case of transplacental transmission of SARS-CoV-2 infection was published in the British journal Nature. The study concerns the case of a pregnant woman, in the last trimester of pregnancy, admitted to Paris-Saclay University Hospital Antoine-Béclère in March 2020.
