= Abdallah Ougazzaden =

French scientist (born 1960)

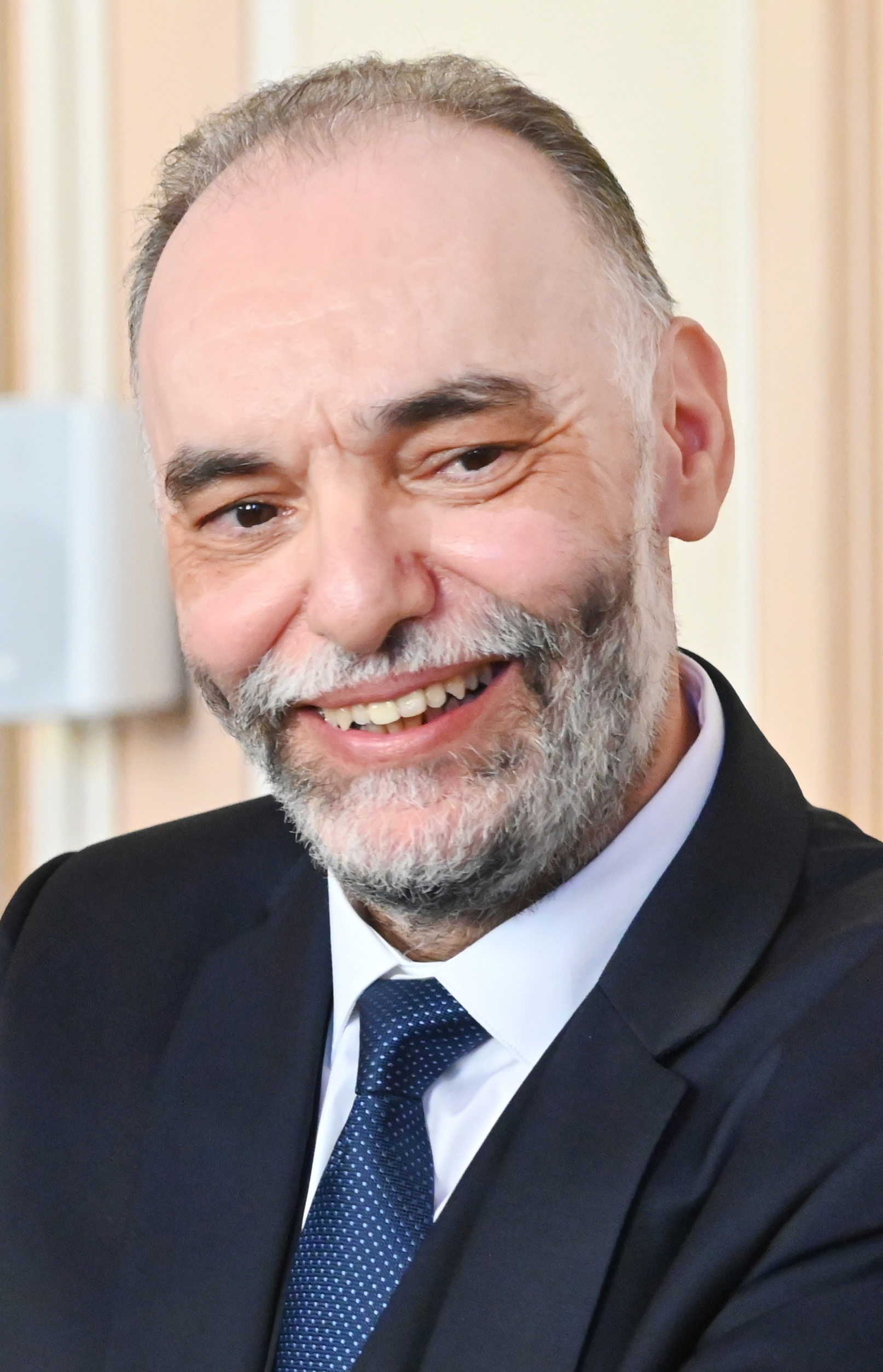
- Ougazzaden at the Legion d'Honneur Ceremony in Metz, France, 2019

President of Georgia Tech Europe, the European Campus of the Georgia Institute of Technology

Personal details
- Born: March 15, 1960 (age 66) Casablanca, Morocco
- Honours: French Legion of Honour; Medal of City of Metz, France; France telecom best research award
- Scientific career
- Education: Ph.D., MS, HDR University Paris VII; BS University of Hassan II
- Known for: Contributions to fiber optic telecommunications, semiconductor optoelectronic materials and components, solar cells and sensors
- Awards: French Legion D'Honneur; Medal of City of Metz, France; France telecom best research award
- Fields: Electrical and Computer Engineering
- Workplaces: Georgia Institute of Technology; University of Lorraine; TriQuint Semiconductor; Agere Systems; Bell Labs - Lucent Technologies; France telecom
- Thesis: Contribution a la technologie d'epitaxie en phase vapeur aux organometalliques appliquee aux composants optoelectroniques classiques et quantiques a base de gainasp (1990)

Abdallah Ougazzaden is a professor at the Georgia Institute of Technology and President of Georgia Tech Europe, the European campus of Georgia Tech. He is the co-founder and co-president of Institut Lafayette, an innovation platform in advanced semiconductor materials/devices. In addition, he previously served for 3 terms as Director of the joint international lab UMI between Georgia Tech and the French CNRS. Ougazzaden's specific research areas of expertise cover the fields of semiconductor materials, photonics, and optoelectronics. He has published over 450 papers and generated 26 patents in these areas.

== Career ==
Abdallah Ougazzaden started his research activity with a doctoral thesis at Centre national d'études des télécommunications (CNET) in France telecom. His doctorate work led to the development of the first semiconductor lasers at 1.3 um in France and to the transfer of this technology to Alcatel CIT. After his doctorate he joined CNET/France Telecom as a researcher where he developed original design of Multiquantum well lasers and electroabsorber modulators at emission wavelength 1.3 micron and 1.5 um for fiber communication. He then joined Opto+, the former joint venture between France Telecom and Alcatel. In 1999 he was hired by Bell Labs/Lucent Technologies in the United States as a Technical Manager. In 2002 he joined Agere Systems (a spinoff of Lucent technologies), and later on TriQuint Semiconductor. In 2003 he returned to France and became a professor at the University of Metz and deputy director of LMOPS, a joint lab between the High Engineering School Supélec (now CentraleSupélec) and University of Metz (now University of Lorraine).

In 2005, Ougazzaden joined the Georgia Institute of Technology as full professor at the School of Electrical and Computer engineering (ECE). He worked with the CNRS (The French National Center for Science) and Georgia Tech to establish France's first International Joint Research Laboratory, GT-CNRS UMI 2958. The lab is located at Georgia Tech-Europe, and he has served as its director from 2006 to 2018.

In 2008, he was the chair and organizer of the XIV IC-MOVPE conference in Metz, France. In 2010 he was appointed director of Georgia Tech–Lorraine (now, Georgia Tech-Europe), the European campus of Georgia Tech in Metz, France. In 2014 he co-founded the Institut Lafayette and became its co-president.

Georgia Tech announced on May 11, 2021 his nomination as President of Georgia Tech Europe starting July 1st 2021.

== Awards ==
- In 2019, he was awarded the Légion d’Honneur, the highest decoration in France on behalf of the French President.
- He has been a member of The National Academy of Metz since 2017.
- In 2015, he was named recipient of the first international Stellab Award from PSA Peugeot Citroen.
- He was awarded the Medal of the City of Metz in 2014, for his main contributions in R&D and economic development.
- He is the recipient of Georgia Institute of Technology Steven A. Denning Award 2013 for Global Engagement for his dedication to economic development.
- He received The France Télécom Best Research Award 1990 for his main contributions to the development of the first laser semiconductor at 1.3-micron for fiber telecommunication in France and its transfer to Alcatel.
