= Dinh Thuy Phan Huy =

Wireless research engineer

- Born: 20 March 1977 (age 49)
- Other name: Dinh-Thuy Phan-Huy
- Education: National Institute of Applied Sciences of Rennes
- Occupation: Research engineer
- Known for: Irène Joliot-Curie Prize

Dinh Thuy Phan Huy (born 20 March 1977) is a research engineer specializing in wireless networks. Her specific research interests include wireless communications, beamforming, spatial modulation, predictor antennae, backscattering, and intelligent reflecting surfaces.

== Biography ==
Dinh Thuy Phan Huy (whose name has been published as Dinh-Thuy Phan-Huy, D. -T. Phan-Huy, D. T. Phan Huy, Dinh Thuy Phan-Huy) received her degree in engineering from the École supérieure d'électricité, commonly called Supelec, in 2001, and her Ph.D. in electronics and telecommunications from the National Institute of Applied Sciences of Rennes, France, in 2015. Her thesis was titled Retournement temporel: application aux réseaux mobiles (Time reversal: application to mobile networks), directed by Maryline Hélard.

In 2018, she received the General Ferrié electronics grand prize for her work on focusing radio waves to improve the energy efficiency of the Internet of Things, "which contributed to the discovery and development of 15 inventions."

In 2001, she joined France Telecom R&D (now Orange Labs Networks), in Châtillon, France where she was a senior researcher with the Technology & Global Innovation. She led the national French collaborative research project TRIMARAN (2011-2014).

Phan Huy has participated in several European Union research projects created to address the architecture and functionality to accommodate 5G and beyond-4G networks. These projects include: Mobile and Wireless Communications Enablers (METIS) (2012–2015); Fantastic 5G, which supports a new mobile radio standard; mmMAGIC – Millimetre-Wave Based Mobile Radio Access Network for 5G communications; and the 5GCAR European Union initiative that investigates future wireless vehicular communication. She has also led the ANR SpatialModulation project (2016–2019) concerned with the spatial focusing of radio waves as a promising solution for connecting smartphones at high speed while improving the energy efficiency of mobile networks.

Phan Huy has applied for more than 40 patents, and she has published more than 20 papers.

== Distinctions ==
Dinh Thuy Phan Huy has been the recipient of several awards in France.

- 2016: Prix Impact Economique des Rencontres du Numérique, from the French National Research Agency,
- 2018: Grand Prix de l’Electronique du General Ferrié, from the French Society of Electricity, Electronics and Information and Communication Technologies
- 2018: Irène Joliot Curie Prize – category Woman in Research and Business, from the French Ministry of Education and Research

== Selected patents and applications ==
Dinh Thuy Phan Huy is listed as an inventor on dozens of patent applications to protect inventions, including these applications (some still pending) to the United States Patent and Trademark Office.

- Method of high-bitrate wireless communication with a multi-antenna receiver, Patent number: 9553651, Date of Patent: January 24, 2017
- Method of TDD precoding, Patent number: 9614603, Date of Patent: April 4, 2017
- Method of communication in a co-operative network, Patent number: 10098015, Date of Patent: October 9, 2018
- Method for transmitting pilot symbols, Publication number: 20210392018, filed October 22, 2019 (pending)
- Ambient Backscattering Communication System, Associated Apparatus and Method, Publication number: 20220052752, filed December 17, 2019 (pending)
