= Alain Bravo =

French electrical engineer

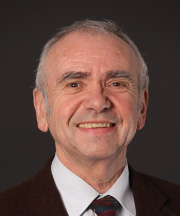

Director of Supélec
- In office 2004–2013
- Succeeded by: Hervé Biausser

Personal details
- Born: 1 April 1945 (age 80) France
- Education: École Polytechnique; Télécom ParisTech
- Occupation: Engineer

Alain Bravo (born 1945) is a French electrical engineer and entrepreneur. His accomplishments include founding one of France's leading mobile phone services, Société française de radiotéléphonie (SFR), and he is currently the president of Abhexis and the managing director of Supélec, one of France's top five engineering schools.

== Biography ==
Alain Bravo is a graduate of the École Polytechnique and Télécom ParisTech. From 1970 to 1985, he worked with France's Direction générale des télécommunications. He became its director of production in 1980, and in 1985, he joined the Compagnie Générale des Eaux. Named executive vice president of the cable television division two years later, he created and chaired, in parallel, the Société Française de Radiotéléphonie (SFR). He left the presidency of SFR in 1992, and from 1991 to 1993, he directed the Compagnie générale de vidéocommunications. In 1994, he was named director of the Compagnie Générale des Eaux, which he would leave one year later.

In 1995, Alain Bravo created Siris, which is today Neuf Cegetel SFR. Then he joined Alcatel as the president of mobile phone network division. He becomes Directeur of Research and Technology in 1998 and left Alcatel in 2001.

He created Abhexis in 2001. For this reason, he directed the FutuRIS operation with the Association Nationale de Recherche Technologique (ANRT) from February 2003 to April 2004.

He currently chairs the Réseau National de Recherche en Télécommunications (RNRT), the Commission Consultative des Réseaux et Services de Télécommunications with the Ministère de l’Industrie and the ARCEP, the N+i network of schools of engineers, and the Société de l'Electricité and l'Electronique et des Technologies de l'Information (SEE). He is Publication director of the Revue de l'Electricité et de l'Electronique (REE), published by the SEE.

He has been managing director of Supélec, an electrical engineering school, since 2004.

Since 2007, he has been President of the T.I.M.E. Association (Top Industrial Managers for Europe), a network of 51 top Engineering Schools and Technical Universities in Europe and worldwide.

In 2015, Alain Bravo becomes the chairman of Data ScienceTech Institute Scientific Advisory Board. As such, he contributes to define and promote higher education programmes to train future Data Scientists and Big Data Analysts.

== Personal ==
His brother Jacques Bravo is the mayor of the ninth district of Paris.
