= Maryline Hélard =

French wireless network research engineer

- Education: National Institute of Applied Sciences
- Occupation: Research engineer

Maryline Hélard (born 1958) is a French research engineer specializing in wireless networks. Her research interests include wired and Wireless communications and multiple-input multiple-output (MIMO) techniques.

== Life and work ==
Maryline Hélard (also known as Maryline Le Guyader) received her engineering degree (1981) and her Ph.D. degree (1984) from the National Institute of Applied Sciences (INSA) (now called Supélec) in Rennes, France, as well as her post-doc habilitation degree in 2004.

Hélard worked for France Telecom (1985–2007), now known as Orange Labs Networks, in Châtillon, France, as a research engineer. In 2007 she returned to INSA Rennes as a full professor and led the IETR (Institut d’Electronique et de Télécommunications de Rennes) Department, located on the Rennes campus of CentraleSupélec. Presently, she is a full professor at INSA Rennes in the Communication Systems and Networks department.

Her PhD students have included the engineer Dinh Thuy Phan Huy (2015).

She has been involved in several collaborative research projects.

== Selected memberships ==
- IEEE, an international society of electrical engineers

== Selected publications ==
Hélard has published more than 260 professional papers and has been granted numerous patents.

- Helard, Maryline, Jacques Citerne, Odile Picon, and V. Fouad Hanna. "Theoretical of and Experimental Investigation Finline Discontinuities." IEEE transactions on microwave theory and techniques 33, no. 10 (1985): 994-1003.
- Helard, Maryline, Rodolphe Le Gouable, Jean-Francois Helard, and Jean-Yves Baudais. "Multicarrier CDMA techniques for future wideband wireless networks." In Annales des télécommunications, vol. 56, no. 5, pp. 260–274. Springer-Verlag, 2001.
- Boher, Laurent, Rodrigue Rabineau, and Maryline Helard. "FPGA implementation of an iterative receiver for MIMO-OFDM systems." IEEE Journal on Selected Areas in Communications 26, no. 6 (2008): 857-866.
- Phan-Huy, Dinh-Thuy, and Maryline Hélard. "Receive antenna shift keying for time reversal wireless communications." In 2012 IEEE International Conference on Communications (ICC), pp. 4852–4856. IEEE, 2012.
- Peng, Linning, Maryline Hélard, and Sylvain Haese. "On bit-loading for discrete multi-tone transmission over short range POF systems." Journal of lightwave technology 31, no. 24 (2013): 4155-4165.
- Maaz, Mohamad, Maryline Hélard, Philippe Mary, and Ming Liu. "Performance analysis of time-reversal based precoding schemes in MISO-OFDM systems." In 2015 IEEE 81st Vehicular Technology Conference (VTC Spring), pp. 1–6. IEEE, 2015.
- Mohamed Shehata, Matthieu Crussière, and Maryline Hélard. On the Theoretical Limits of Beam Steering in mmWave Massive MIMO Channels. In 2019 IEEE 30th Annual International Symposium on Personal, Indoor and Mobile Radio Communications (PIMRC). IEEE Press, 1–6. 2019. DOI:https://doi.org/10.1109/PIMRC.2019.8904228
