= Silviu-Iulian Niculescu =

Romanian-French mathematician (born 1968)

- Born: 1968 (age 57–58); Petroșani, Romania
- Known for: Time-delay systems
- Awards: CNRS Bronze Medal (2001) CNRS Silver Medal (2011); IEEE Fellow (2018); Doctor honoris causa, University of Craiova (2016) IFAC Fellow (2025)
- Scientific career
- Fields: Control theory Applied mathematics Dynamical systems Time-delay systems
- Workplaces: Paris-Saclay University CNRS; Laboratory of Signals and Systems (L2S), CentraleSupélec Inria (DISCO team)

Silviu-Iulian Niculescu (born 1968 in Petroșani, Romania) is a Romanian-French applied mathematician specializing in control theory and the analysis of dynamical systems with delays. He is a research director at the French National Centre for Scientific Research (CNRS) and a member of the Laboratory of Signals and Systems (L2S) at CentraleSupélec. He is also a member and co-founder of the Inria DISCO research team.

Niculescu's research concerns the analysis and control of dynamical systems affected by time delays. His work includes stability and stabilization, robust control, operator theory, and numerical optimization. He was elected an IEEE Fellow in 2018 for research on the effects of delays in system dynamics and an IFAC Fellow in 2025 for contributions to the analysis and control of dynamical systems with delays.

== Early life and education ==
Niculescu was born in Petroșani, Romania, on 7 September 1968. He studied automatic control at the Polytechnic Institute of Bucharest, now the Politehnica University of Bucharest, where he received an engineering degree in 1992.

He continued his studies in France at the Institut National Polytechnique de Grenoble, receiving a postgraduate DEA degree, approximately equivalent to a research master's degree, in automatic control in 1993. He completed his PhD in automatic control at the same institution in 1996. His doctoral thesis received the institute's PhD Thesis Award.

In 2003, he obtained the French Habilitation à diriger des recherches in automatic control from the University of Technology of Compiègne.

== Career ==
From 1992 to 1997, Niculescu was affiliated with the Department of Automatic Control and Computers at the Politehnica University of Bucharest, where he worked as a teaching assistant.

Between 1996 and 1997, he held a postdoctoral position in the Department of Applied Mathematics at ENSTA Paris. During this period, he worked on applications of convex optimization to the dynamic behaviour of engineering systems.

Niculescu joined CNRS in 1997 as a researcher at the HEUDIASYC laboratory—Heuristics and Diagnosis of Complex Systems—in Compiègne. His work there included the development of methods for studying uncertainty and delay effects in dynamical systems. He became a CNRS research director in 2005.

In September 2006, he joined the Laboratory of Signals and Systems in Gif-sur-Yvette. L2S is a joint laboratory associated with CNRS, CentraleSupélec and Paris-Saclay University. Niculescu served as director of L2S from 2010 to 2019.

In 2010, he co-founded DISCO, an Inria research team jointly associated with Inria, CNRS and CentraleSupélec. The team's name refers to the dynamics of interconnected systems in complex environments. He has continued as a permanent member of the team.

== Research ==
Niculescu's main area of research is the mathematical analysis and control of systems in which the current evolution depends on past states, inputs or measurements.

His early research addressed the use of robust-control techniques to characterize stability regions with respect to delay parameters. His 2001 monograph, Delay Effects on Stability: A Robust Control Approach, presented delays as a source of uncertainty and applied methods from robust control and convex optimization to the analysis of delayed systems.

Together with Wim Michiels, Niculescu also developed an eigenvalue-based presentation of the stability and stabilization of linear time-delay systems. The 2007 book, Stability and Stabilization of Time-Delay Systems, examined the relation between characteristic roots, spectral properties and the asymptotic behaviour of delayed differential equations. A substantially expanded second edition, published in 2014 as Stability, Control, and Computation for Time-Delay Systems, incorporated numerical algorithms for characteristic roots, stability analysis, stabilization and robust-control design.

Niculescu received the CNRS Bronze Medal in 2001 and the CNRS Silver Medal in 2011 in recognition of his contributions to the analysis and control of dynamical systems with time delays.

== Professional service ==
Niculescu was an associate editor of IEEE Transactions on Automatic Control from 2003 to 2005. He has also served in editorial positions for the European Journal of Control and the IMA Journal of Mathematical Control and Information.

Within the International Federation of Automatic Control, he initiated and coordinated the IFAC Working Group on Time-Delay Systems from 2007 to 2017. He subsequently chaired IFAC Technical Committee from 2017 to 2023.

Since 2012, Niculescu has been the founding editor and editor-in-chief of the Springer Nature book series Advances in Delays and Dynamics.

== Selected works ==
=== Books ===
- Niculescu, Silviu-Iulian (2001). Delay Effects on Stability: A Robust Control Approach. Lecture Notes in Control and Information Sciences. Vol. 269. Springer. doi:10.1007/1-84628-553-4. ISBN 978-1-85233-291-4.
- Michiels, Wim; Niculescu, Silviu-Iulian (2007). Stability and Stabilization of Time-Delay Systems: An Eigenvalue-Based Approach. Advances in Design and Control. Society for Industrial and Applied Mathematics. doi:10.1137/1.9780898718645. ISBN 978-0-89871-632-0.
- Michiels, Wim; Niculescu, Silviu-Iulian (2014). Stability, Control, and Computation for Time-Delay Systems: An Eigenvalue-Based Approach. Advances in Design and Control (2nd ed.). Society for Industrial and Applied Mathematics. doi:10.1137/1.9781611973631. ISBN 978-1-61197-362-4.
- Li, Xu-Guang; Niculescu, Silviu-Iulian; Çela, Arben (2015). Analytic Curve Frequency-Sweeping Stability Tests for Systems with Commensurate Delays. Springer. doi:10.1007/978-3-319-15717-7. ISBN 978-3-319-15716-0.
