= Optical materials, photonics and systems laboratory =

LMOPS Optical materials, photonics and systems
- Latin: Laboratoire Matériaux Optiques, Photonique & Systèmes
- Established: 2000
- Field of research: Physics, Chemistry, Materials, Optics, Photonics
- Director: Nicolas Fressengeas
- Faculty: 26
- Students: 30
- Location: Metz, France
- Affiliations: Université de Lorraine; CentraleSupélec
- Website: lmops.univ-lorraine.fr

The optical materials, photonics and systems laboratory (LMOPS) gathers researchers from Lorraine university and from CentraleSupélec, in the cities of Metz, Saint-Avold and Thionville. The research themes lie in the fields of materials in general and optical materials more specifically, non linear optics, optical sensors and photovoltaics. Almost 30 researchers are working in the laboratory, side by side with roughly the same number of PhD students. The LMOPS was created in the year 2000, building from its ancestor, the Laboratoire Matériaux optiques à propriétés spécifiques, which belonged to the Metz university, which teamed with Supélec in 2000.

== Location ==
The LMOPS laboratory is spread over 4 cities:

- Its central part is situated in the Technopôle de Metz within the Metz campus of CentraleSupélec
- A second site in Metz is hosted by the Sciences fondamentales et appliquées Lorraine university unit, within the Institute for Material Physics and Chemistry
- the Saint-Avold site is hosted by the Institut universitaire de technologie de Moselle-Est, within the Lorraine university
- the Thionville site is hosted by the Institut universitaire de technologie de Thionville-Yutz within the Lorraine university.

== Research teams ==
The research activities within the LMOPS are structured through 4 research teams.

- The Functional Materials team deals with materials in general, particularly optical materials and polymers
- The Photonics team is mainly devoted to non linear optics
- The Raman sensors & Optical control team has a strong background in Raman spectroscopy
- The Photovoltaics team studies materials and systems for the harvesting of solar energy

== Facilities ==
The LMOPS laboratory’s equipment includes many optical spectrometers. One member of the team is specialized in Raman Spectroscopy and works with many kinds of Raman spectrometers. absorption spectrometers can also be found in the laboratory as well as X-ray fluorescence spectrometers.

The electrical characterization of materials and devices is also an important aspect of the LMOPS activities. Facilities are available for measuring current-voltage curves as a function of temperature if necessary, for determining the charge carriers, and for measuring capacity-voltage and impedance curves.

Finally, besides the many laser sources which are always needed in such a laboratory, the LMOPS can rely on heavy equipment for actual material fabrication, such as ovens using the Czochralski process to grow bulk non linear crystals to be used for laser frequency doubling, and MOVPE equipment for the deposition of thin layers of semi-conductors. The laboratory also can use a lightweight micro-pulling down crystalline fibre machine.
