= Georgia Tech Europe =

University in Metz, France

Coordinates: 49.102390°N 6.216202°E

- Georgia Institute of Technology
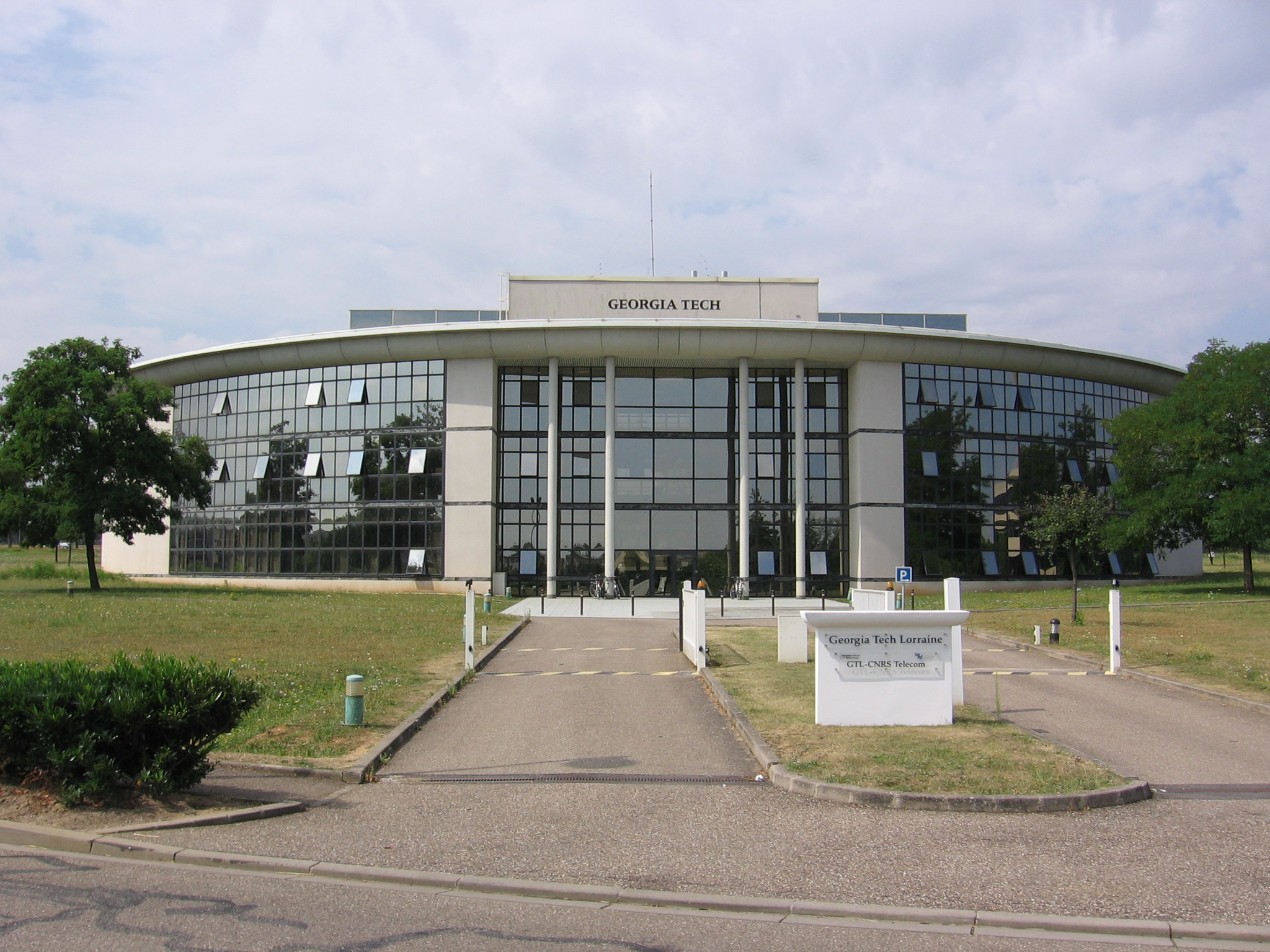
- Established: 1990
- President: Abdallah Ougazzaden
- Location: Metz, France
- Campus: Rural
- Website: europe.gatech.edu

Georgia Tech Europe (GTE) is a campus of the Georgia Institute of Technology in Metz, France, and is part of Georgia Tech's International Plan. GTE offers undergraduate and graduate programs in electrical and computer engineering, mechanical engineering, computer science, aerospace engineering, and liberal arts.

== Organization ==
Georgia Tech Europe is integrated into French and American structures—it is an affiliate of the Georgia Institute of Technology, and it is incorporated under French law as a non-profit organization ("Association à but non lucratif").

GTE is also home to a sponsored research program through the Georgia Tech – CNRS Unité Mixte Internationale (GT-CNRS UMI 2958), an international joint laboratory between the Georgia Institute of Technology in Atlanta, Georgia, United States, and the French National Centre for Scientific Research in the area of advanced materials, secured networks, non-linear dynamics and optics, and robotics.

== History ==
Georgia Tech-Europe was established as Georgia Institute of Technology's first international campus in 1990. Initially offering a graduate program in electrical and computer engineering, GTE has expanded its graduate program to include degree programs in mechanical engineering and computer science. Instruction is in English and admissions are through Georgia Tech's home campus in Atlanta, Georgia. GTE subsequently expanded its academic programs to include undergraduate program in the fall, spring and summer. As of 2012, over 3,000 undergraduate and graduate students have studied at GTE.

In 2010, officials from the Lorraine region of France and the Georgia Institute of Technology signed a letter of intent to establish the Lafayette Institute, a $30 million facility that will facilitate the research, development, and commercialization of innovations in optoelectronics. Construction of the facility, a 20,000 square feet (1,900 m^{2}) building, located on the Georgia Tech Europe campus, is scheduled to start in 2012 and open at the end of 2013.

Georgia Tech Europe was subject to a much-publicized lawsuit around 1996 pertaining to the language used in advertisements, over what is known in France as Toubon Law. Soon after the Toubon Law came into force, two French lobbying groups, the Association pour la Défense de la Langue Française and the L'Avenir de la Langue Française, filed a complaint against Georgia Tech Europe. At the time of the complaint, all classes at the school were conducted in English, and all course descriptions on its website were only in English. The complaint invoked the Toubon Law to demand that the school's website be in French because the website was effectively a commercial advertisement for the school's courses. Although the case was dismissed by the court on a legal technicality, and the lobbying groups chose to drop the matter, Georgia Tech Europe was moved to offer its French website in the French language in addition to English, although classes continued to be in English only.

In 2022, the university was renamed from Georgia Tech Lorraine to Georgia Tech Europe.

== Courses ==
Courses are taught in English. The faculty includes professors who are permanently assigned to GTE as well as professors who rotate in from the main campus in Atlanta. GTE offers master's level courses in Electrical and Computer Engineering, Computer Science and Mechanical Engineering and Ph.D.s in Electrical and Computer Engineering and in Mechanical Engineering. GTE also offers undergraduate courses in a variety of engineering disciplines as well as non-engineering courses such as History, Technology, and Society, International Affairs, and French Language.

Most of the GTE graduate students participate in a double degree program with partner French schools for master's and Ph.D. degrees. Students spend 1–2 semesters at GTE and 1–2 semesters at the partner campus to earn the two master's degrees in about two years. Students are required to learn French if they wish to participate in the double degree program. A three-month internship is a required part of the double degree program.

Most of the French students from partner institutions visit the Atlanta campus for 1–2 semesters to complete their requirements. Certificate courses offered by the College of Management are studied by French students, for their Grand Ecole education.

== Research ==
GTE is partnered with several French institutions, offering research and coursework to students who participate. In addition to the educational programs, GTE hosts the Unite Mixte Internationale 2958 Georgia Tech-CNRS laboratory which focuses on smart materials and secure communications.

== Double degree partners ==
GTE offers double degree programs with the following French schools:

- Arts et Métiers ParisTech (ENSAM)
- École Catholique d'Arts et Métiers (ECAM)
- École des Mines d'Alès
- Ecole des Mines d'Albi
- École des Mines de Douai
- École des Mines de Nantes
- ENSEA
- ENSEEIHT
- École nationale supérieure d'électricité et de mécanique (ENSEM)
- ENSTA Bretagne
- ESIEE Paris
- INSA Lyon
- Supélec
- Telecom SudParis
- UTC
- UTT
