= Philippe Morillon =

French general and politician (1935–2026)

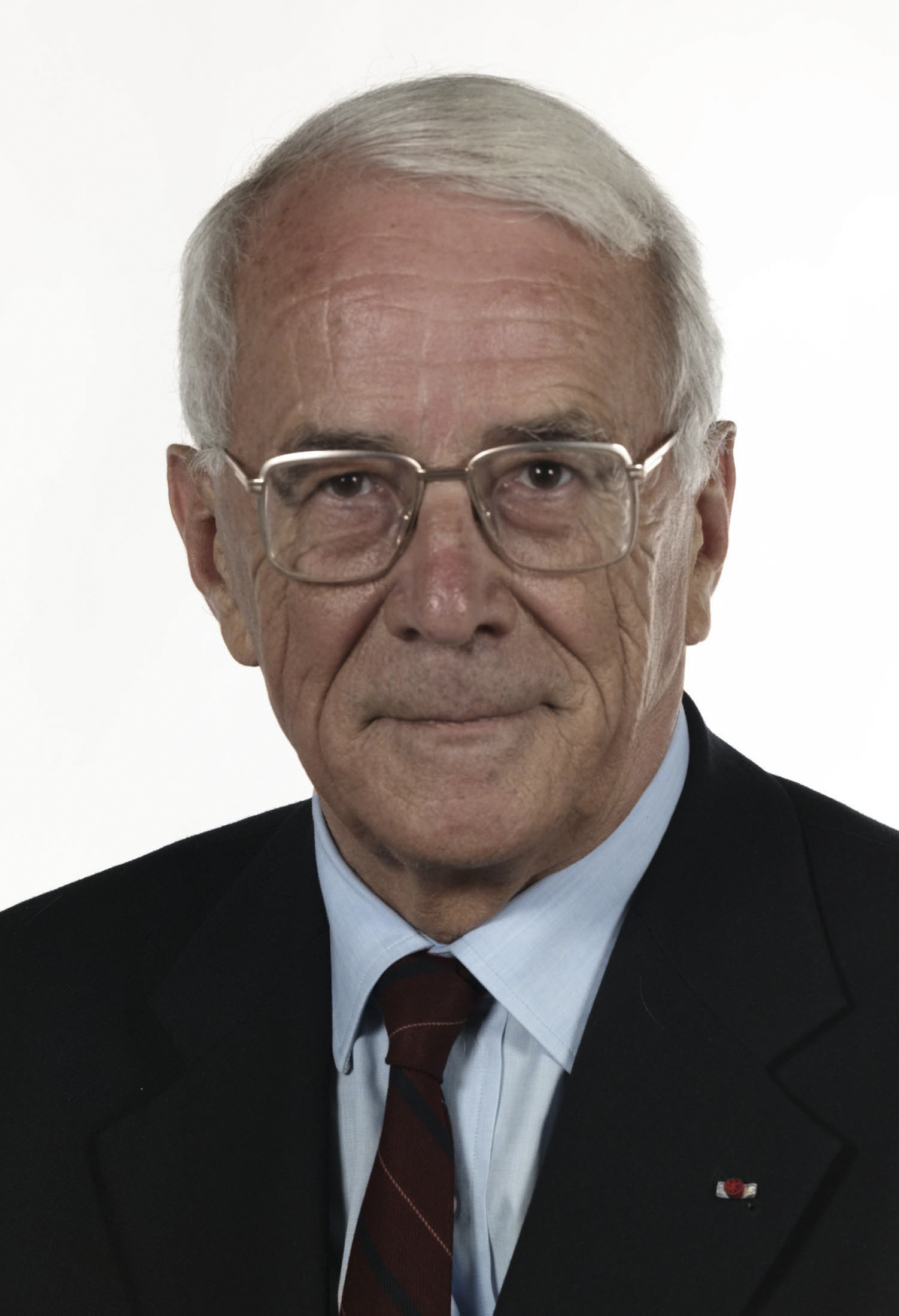
- Official portrait, 1999
- Born: 24 October 1935; Casablanca, French Morocco
- Died: 29 January 2026 (aged 90); Saumur, France
- Education: École spéciale militaire de Saint-Cyr (1956); Supélec (1964); French Army Staff College (1974)
- Occupations: General; Member of the European Parliament
- Employer: FORPRONU

Philippe Morillon (French pronunciation: [filip mɔʁijɔ̃]; 24 October 1935 – 29 January 2026) was a French general, who commanded the United Nations Defence Force during the Bosnian War between 1992 and 1993. He later was a Member of the European Parliament between 1999 and 2009, elected on the Union for French Democracy ticket with the Alliance of Liberals and Democrats for Europe group.

He is a controversial figure in Bosnia. His phrase to the crowd "you are now under the protection of the UN. I will never abandon you." before leaving Srebrenica in 1993 is remembered by locals as Western countries' abandonment of the Bosnians when the Srebrenica massacre occurred two years later. However, outside Bosnia, Morillon was recognised as the person who warned of the humanitarian crisis in Srebrenica and contributed to improving the situation in the city.

== Early life ==
Morillon was born on 24 October 1935 in Casablanca, French Morocco. He participated in the Algerian War as an officer and had a career in the Armored Corps of the French Army. He studied at the École spéciale militaire de Saint-Cyrin 1956, at Supélec in 1964 and at the French Army Staff College. He supported the Algiers putsch of 1961 against Charles de Gaulle.

== War in Bosnia ==
During the Bosnia War (1992–1995), Morillon was named commander of the United Nations Forces in the country in 1992 after he volunteered for this office. In early March 1993, at least between 30.000 and 60.000 Bosniak refugees arrived in Srebrenica fleeing the Serbian military offensive. Keen to see the situation for himself in the city, which was becoming critical, besieged and overcrowded, Morillon travelled to Srebrenica on 11 March 1993. He had previously visited Cerska where a massacre had taken place.

After holding a meeting with military and civilian authorities, the crowd prevented him from leaving as a protest organised by Fatima Husejnović. He told the authorities that people should leave Srebrenica. Despite Morillon's intention to return to Sarajevo, he stayed, and days later uttered the phrase from the window: "You are now under the protection of the UN. I will never abandon you."

In a 13 March broadcast on amateur radio, he stated that it was his duty to remain in the city because a great tragedy was about to occur. Morillon stayed for two weeks. The Serbian bombings continued, even hitting the post office where Morillon and his team were staying and where the UN flag had been hoisted. He visited Serbian President Slobodan Milošević in Belgrade, and when Morillon returned to Srebrenica, the bombing ceased. During those days, convoys arrived in Srebrenica with food and representatives from various international organisations such as UNHCR, the Red Cross and Médecins Sans Frontières, and the seriously wounded and sick were evacuated. Two years later, the Srebrenica massacre took place.

In April 1993, Cedric Thornberry, deputy head of the UN mission to Yugoslavia, stated that Morillon's promise to defend Srebrenica was a mistake, as UN troops had a mandate for humanitarian aid and not for peacekeeping, and could not exceed the mandate ordered by the United Nations Security Council. José María Mendiluce, the UNHCR special envoy to Yugoslavia, said that Morillon succeeded in drawing the world's attention to the moral injustice taking place in the territory.

In 2010, after retiring, Morillon visited Srebrenica to visit the Srebrenica Genocide Memorial and apologise for what happened after he abandoned the city, but several victims' associations expelled him, believing that he had allowed the massacre to occur. However, outside Bosnia, Morillon was recognised for warning of the humanitarian crisis in Srebrenica, as he had warned Milošević that a "terrible tragedy" could take place there if Milošević did nothing to calm the situation.

== Later life ==
Morillon testified in the International Criminal Tribunal for the former Yugoslavia on 12 February 2004.

After Bosnia, Morillon commanded the Rapid Reaction Force, after which he retired with the rank of army corps general in 1997.

He was elected Member of the European Parliament in the 1999 election and re-elected in 2004 with the Union for French Democracy in the Alliance of Liberals and Democrats for Europe group.

== Death ==
Morillon died on 29 January 2026, at the age of 90. His death was announced by the France's Minister of the Armed Forces and Veterans Affairs Catherine Vautrin. His death was mourned by the Chief of the Armed Forces Pierre Schill and Minister of Foreign Affairs Jean-Noël Barrot.

== Honors ==
- Legion of Honour (France)
- Grand Cross of the Ordre national du Mérite (France)
