= Dominique Vidal =

- Born: September 25, 1964 (age 62); Narbonne, Southern France
- Education: Supelec
- Occupations: Venture capitalist and investor, partner at Index Ventures
- Spouse: Isabelle Vidal
- Children: 3

Dominique Vidal is a partner at Index Ventures, a global venture capital firm with offices in London, Geneva and San Francisco. He was formerly managing director of Yahoo! Europe.

== Early life and education ==
Vidal was born in Narbonne, in southern France, raised primarily in Toulouse, in southwestern France, and schooled in Paris. He received a master's degree from Supelec, the French engineering school.

== Career ==
Vidal began his career at Schlumberger, where he worked for ten years in product marketing and business development roles in the telecom and smart card industries in France, the United States and Asia. Next, Vidal became a partner at Banexi Ventures, a venture capital firm headquartered in Paris, where he led investments in a number of companies including Kelkoo, a European shopping search engine, as well as Algety and In Fusio. Vidal then segued into a role as managing director at Kelkoo until its acquisition by Yahoo! in March 2004, at which point he assumed the role of Managing Director of Yahoo! Europe(Nasdaq: YHOO) until 2007.

In 2007 Vidal joined the London office of Index Ventures as partner. At Index, he has been involved with a number of different portfolio companies, including ASOS (LSE: ASOS). Vidal currently sits on the board of directors of a number of companies, including Adconion, Be2, Criteo(Nasdaq: CRTO), Metapack, Navabi, Outbrain, and Squarespace, and is a non-executive director at Techmedia.
