= Jeannine Henaff =

French electrical engineer

Jeannine Henaff (born 7 August 1936, also published as Jeannine Le Goff epouse Henaff) is a French electrical engineer affiliated with the Centre national d'études des télécommunications who published early work on the applications of surface acoustic waves in electronics, including the use of SAW filters to perform Hadamard transforms for videotelephony.

Henaff was born on 7 August 1936 in Paris. She studied engineering at the École supérieure d'électricité, commonly called Supélec, earned a doctorate in physical sciences, and began working for the Centre national d'études des télécommunications (CNET) in 1958.

With Michel Feldmann, she wrote the book Traitement du signal par ondes élastiques de surface (Masson, 1986), translated into English as Surface Acoustic Waves for Signal Processing (Artech, 1989). She was named a Fellow of the IEEE in 1997, "for contributions to the analysis, design and realization of telecommunication systems".
