= Atelier national de reproduction des thèses =

Atelier National de Reproduction des Thèses
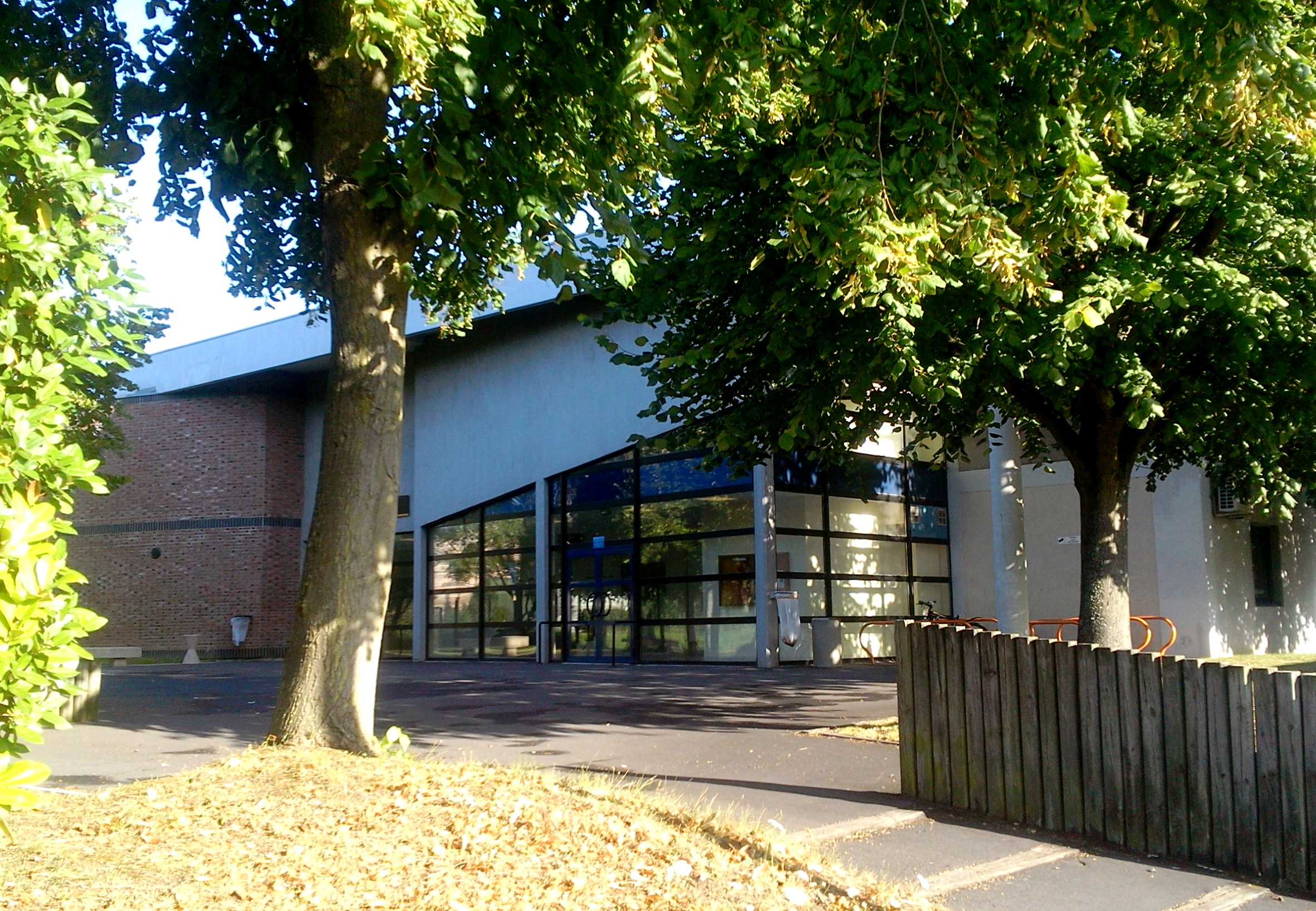
- ANRT building on the Lille campus
- Established: 1971 - 2017
- Research type: public
- Budget: €320,000 (2017)
- Director: Joachim Schöpfel 2012-2017
- Staff: 16
- Location: Domaine universitaire Pont de Bois - BP 60149, Villeneuve d'Ascq, Hauts-de-France, 59653, France
- Campus: Pont de Bois
- Affiliations: Charles de Gaulle University Lille III
- Website: anrt.univ-lille3.fr

== Public function ==
The French Atelier National de Réproduction des Thèses (ANRT), the national reproduction centre for PhD theses, was a public body under the French Ministry of Higher Education and Research (department of scientific and technical information and documentation network) until 2017. The ANRT mandate was to archive French PhD theses and to disseminate them in the academic network of university libraries, and to contribute to the valorization of the French scientific production of Higher Education and research. It was attached as a service to the University of Lille III and located on the Lille III campus at Villeneuve-d'Ascq, in Northern France. In 2018, ANRT became a digitization unit of the academic library of the new University of Lille.

== History ==
ANRT was created in 1971 to take charge of the reproduction of PhD theses of State (at the beginning, only social sciences and humanities). Starting with offset, reproduction on microfilm has been established since 1983, following the model of University Microfilms International.

At the beginning, there were two national centres, according to academic disciplines:

- One attached to the University of Lille III – social sciences and humanities, political science and law;
- the other attached to the University of Grenoble for the sciences, medicine, pharmacy, economics and management.

Both public institutions were part of the French national network for theses. Their role was to transform the print originals into microfiches and thus to contribute to the editing and reproduction of theses In 2011 the two centres merged into one structure, located in a facility on the campus Pont de Bois of the University of Lille III at Villeneuve d'Ascq.

ANRT worked closely with the Ministry of Higher Education, with the Bibliographic Agency for Higher Education (ABES) and the university libraries. The ANRT network of users and customers extended beyond French borders and includes academic and scientific libraries and scientific bookstores in different European countries, America and Asia.

In 2017, the Ministry of Higher Education decided to discontinue the production and dissemination of PhD theses on microfiches and terminated the national mandate of the service.

== Services ==
As part of its national mandate, the ANRT provided university libraries with PhD theses on microfilm (microfiche). Upon request and under conditions, the ANRT could also provide digital files or a printed version to academic institutions.

The ANRT catalog contains 230,000 theses in all disciplines and is a unique heritage for the entire scientific community. Based on a non exclusive license with authors, over 7,600 theses are available through a print on demand service (POD) called Thèses à la Carte.

ANRT prints scientific documents (journals, books, conference proceedings) and digitizes scientific collections (ancient books, theses, etc.).

== Perspectives ==
Under the tutelage of the French Ministry, ANRT participated in the national project of a Digital Scientific Library called Bibliothèque Numérique Scientifique (BSN).

With the evolution of digital dissemination of theses, ANRT is positioned as a provider of digitization and dissemination of scientific production and contributes, on a regional level and with the university of Lille, to education and research projects.

== See also ==
- Système universitaire de documentation
- University Microfilms International
- Thesis
- Microform
- Digitizing
- Charles de Gaulle University - Lille III
