= Hervé Biausser =

French engineering school director

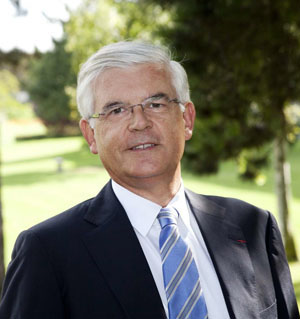

Director of CentraleSupélec
- In office 1 January 2015 – 31 August 2018

Personal details
- Born: 17 February 1951 (age 75) Charenton-le-Pont, France
- Education: Lycée Louis-le-Grand
- Alma mater: École Centrale Paris

Hervé Biausser (French pronunciation: [ɛʁve bjosɛʁ]; born 17 February 1951) is the former director of two French engineering schools, École Centrale Paris and Supélec, positions he has held since 2003 and 2013, respectively. He was the director of CentraleSupélec from 1 January 2015, date when the fusion of the two schools was effective, until 31 August 2018 when he was replaced by Romain Soubeyran.

== Career ==
Biausser studied engineering at École Centrale Paris. He began his PhD studies at École Centrale Paris and, before defending, joined IRSID, the research institute of the French steel industry group Usinor in 1977. There, he researched steel processing and steel products, held several managerial positions, and was responsible for the Mechanical Metallurgy Department. He then became a professor at his alma mater. He was promoted to the head of the Materials Development laboratory, a position he held from 1998 to 2001. In July 2001, he became Director of the Research Centre of the institution, head of the Graduate School, and director of the sister company Centrale Recherche SA. In 2003, he became the director of École Centrale Paris, replacing Daniel Gourisse, who had been director for twenty years.

During his tenure as director, École Centrale Paris organized a renovation of the Centralien curriculum. Biausser has been a strong advocate for the partnership with another engineering school, Supélec, and for the move from the Châtenay-Malabry campus to the Paris-Saclay one, which is underway. At the same time, the Centrale Graduate School expanded by opening a new school in Beijing, École Centrale de Pékin. Another École Centrale is expected to open soon in Casablanca, and it was announced that another school should open in India in the near future.

In 2013, Biausser was selected as the new General Director of Supélec. He continues as director of École Centrale Paris.

Biausser is a member of the board of the Conference des Grandes Écoles, where, after being secretary, he became vice-president in June 2009. He was president of CESAER, a European association of engineering schools, in 2009 and 2010. He has also been president of the TIME network, which promotes the exchange of engineering students.

== Education ==
- Engineering degree at the École Centrale Paris, 1973
- Bachelor of Economics (Licencié ès sciences économiques, Paris I), 1975

== Awards ==
- Jean Rist Award from the "Société Française de Métallurgie et des Matériaux" (SF2M, French Society for Metallurgy and Materials), 1985
- Grande Médaille (highest award) from the Société Française de Métallurgie et des Matériaux (SF2M), 2005
- Knight of the Légion d'Honneur, 2006
- Officer of the Ordre National du Mérite
- Doctor Honoris Causa, University of Mons, Belgium, 2012

== Personal life ==
His father was Breton and his mother from Réunion. He likes yoga, opera, and classical Greek authors, and is a former handball player.
