= Spatial modulation =

Signal transmission technique

In signal processing, spatial modulation is a technique that enables modulation over space, across different antennas at a transmitter. Unlike multiple-input and multiple-output (MIMO) wireless (where all the transmitting antennas are active and transmitting digital modulated symbols such as phase-shift keying and quadrature amplitude modulation), in spatial modulation, only a single antenna among all transmitting antennas is active and transmitting, while all other remaining transmitting antennas sit idle. The duty of the receiver is: to estimate the active antenna index at the transmitter and to decode the symbol sent by the transmitting antenna.

Both processes carry a message bit. Since only one transmitting antenna is active at a particular instant, one single RF chain for the active antenna is required, unlike MIMO systems in which N_{T} (number of transmitting antennas) antennas are active and correspondingly N_{T} number of RF chains are required. RF chains are costly, which makes spatial modulation (SM) much cheaper to implement. Conventional MIMO systems suffer from problems such as inter-antenna interference and transmit antenna synchronization issues because all transmitting antennas are active.

== Procedure ==
In SM, a series of information bits come to the transmitter. The transmitter divides the incoming bits in a chunk of k+l bits, where k is an exponent of two used for deciding the antenna index from which the l bits will be transmitted after applying an M-ary transmission or modulation scheme. In fact, only l bits are transmitted practically, since the antenna index also carries information of k bits, hence in total k+l bits will be decoded at the receiver.

== Example ==
An SM transmitter with N_{T}=2 antennas uses a binary phase-shift keying (BPSK) modulator. In that case, the transmitter can transmit a BPSK symbol by performing BPSK modulation, which will carry a message bit. The antenna index from which the BPSK symbol is transmitted carries an additional bit of information as illustrated in Table 1.

Table 1: SM mapping table for N_{T} = 2 and M = 2 (BPSK)
Incoming bits	Antenna index	BPSK symbol transmitted
00	1	1
01	1	-1
10	2	1
11	2	-1

An incoming message bit string 10 matches the third row in the lookup table. In bit numbering, the most significant bit (MSB) is 1 and the least significant bit (LSB) is 0. The MSB indicates the transmitting antenna index while LSB indicates which BPSK symbol to transmit. If MSB=0 the first antenna will transmit the symbol. If MSB=1 then the second antenna will transmit. For LSB=0, BPSK symbol 1 will be transmitted whereas for LSB =1, BPSK symbol -1 will be transmitted. In this case, k = l = 1, so only one message bit is transmitted from the second antenna. The receiver decodes both the message bit as well as the active antenna index, effectively two message bits are decoded. Therefore, the spectral efficiency of the SM transmitter in this case is 2 bit/s/Hz.

The receiver must estimate the antenna index, as well as decode the symbol.

== Advanced spatial modulation ==
In order to improve the spectral efficiency, SM has been modified to various advanced SM schemes:

- Quadrature Spatial modulation
- Improved Spatial modulation
- Generalized Spatial modulation
- Spatial media Based modulation
- Enhanced Spatial Modulation

In some of the above advanced SM methods, more than one transmitting antenna is active at a time at the transmitter in order to improve spectral efficiency. SM and its advanced variants are used in free-space optical communication termed as Optical spatial modulation and Advanced Optical Spatial Modulation, respectively.
