= Supélec =

French graduate school of engineering

- École supérieure d'électricité
- Motto: Une grande école d'ingénieurs au cœur des sciences de l'information, de l'énergie et des systèmes
- Motto in English: A "grande école" of engineering in the forefront of Energy and Information Science
- Type: Private French Grande École
- Active: 1894–2015
- Founder: Éleuthère Mascart
- Affiliations: UniverSud Paris, Elles Bougent, CESAER
- President: Hervé Biausser
- Postgraduates: 1,975 (1,549 engineer candidates)
- Doctoral students: 250
- Location: Gif-sur-Yvette, Rennes, Metz, France; 48.708677°N 2.163996°E
- Website: Official website in English

École supérieure d'électricité (French pronunciation: [ekɔl sypeʁjœʁ delɛktʁisite], lit. 'Higher School of Electricity'), commonly known as Supélec (French pronunciation: [sypelɛk]), was a French graduate school of engineering. It was one of the most prestigious grandes écoles in France in the field of electrical engineering, energy and information sciences. In 2015, Supélec merged with École Centrale Paris and became CentraleSupélec, a constituent member of Université Paris-Saclay.

Founded in 1894 and initially located in the 15th district of Paris, it was moved to Gif-sur-Yvette in 1975. Since then, two more campuses have been established, in Rennes in 1972 and Metz in 1985. It is a member of Top Industrial Managers for Europe (TIME) network. It is also a member of the CESAER Association and n+i Engineering Studies.

== History ==
Supélec was founded in 1894 by Eleuthère Mascart. He was elected: Perpetual Member and Secretary of the Académie des Sciences and Foreign Member of the British Royal Society, Professor at the Collège de France, and won the Bordin Prize in 1866 and the Grand prix de l'Académie des sciences in 1874.

From 2004 to 2013, the director of Supélec was Alain Bravo. Hervé Biausser became the director on 1 September 2013, while keeping the directorship of Centrale Paris.

Historically the goal of Supélec was to educate engineers for the then booming electrical industry.

== Location ==
Supélec was originally based in Rue de Staël, 15th district of Paris. Then it moved to Malakoff, close to Porte de Vanves and to Gif-sur-Yvette in 1975 where the main campus is currently located. A second campus was established in Rennes in 1972 and a third one in Metz in 1985.

== Academics ==
=== Demographics ===
The student body consists of 1,975 graduate students spread over Supélec's three campuses, and 780 full-time and part-time faculty (October 2009). As is historically true of engineering institutions, female enrollment at Supélec is low, with about three times as many male students as female students. However, this is slowly changing due to the school's outreach programs to encourage more female high school students to consider careers in science and engineering. These include the "Ingénieure: un avenir au féminin" program. In 2008, 25% of graduates were foreign students, coming from 22 countries.

=== Funding ===
Supélec was a private non-profit institution (Association loi 1901) under the supervision of the Ministry of Higher Education and the Ministry of Industry. In 2008, Supélec's revenue amounted to €35 million, with 48% of that amount from the state, 24% from research contracts and 5% from tuition and fees. About 25% of the school's expenses went to research (€8.6 million) and 68% to faculty and staff.

=== Rankings ===
Supélec was consistently ranked well; it has remained in the top five engineering schools in France. In 2013, L'Etudiant ranked Supélec the fourth engineering school in France (ex aequo), and according to salary surveys its graduates are among the highest paid of all French graduates.

=== Curriculum ===
Education at Supélec is multidipliscinary and typically lasts three to four years. During the first two years, students are required to take classes in science (statistics, probability, quantum mechanics,...), in engineering (computer programming, signal processing,...) and in social sciences (economics, foreign languages,...), and can choose elective classes as numerous as varied (arts, superconductivity, sustainable development, finance, biology, psychology,...). For their third year, students choose a major in a specific field among fifteen for half the course, and the second half is devoted to research and development activities in the form of laboratory studies, project work, industrial research contracts.

Students are also warmly encouraged to spend at least six months abroad in one of Supélec's 70 partner universities, or they can spend two years abroad instead of their third year at Supélec and graduate from both Supélec and the partner university. In 2008, 40% of graduates have obtained double degrees. Partners include world leading institutions like MIT, Columbia and Georgia Tech in the US, Cambridge, Oxford, Imperial College and UCL in the UK.

After graduation, graduates find employment in diverse areas including Engineering, R&D, Consulting and Banking, or pursue PhD studies.

=== Admission ===
The admission as first year student to Supélec is generally made through a very selective entrance examination, and requires at least two years of preparation after high school in Classes Préparatoires. Admission includes a week of written examinations, during Spring, followed by oral examinations which are handled in batches spanning over Summer, and is done in common with the Centrale Graduate School. About 10% of graduates were admitted after obtaining a three-year degree in a French university, 25% are foreign students through international exchange programs.

=== Research ===
Supélec is profoundly involved in research; it is one of the only three institutions in France with ENS Ulm and Ecole polytechnique to be a member of two Advanced Research Thematic Networks (Réseaux thématiques de recherché avancée, RTRA) – research associations grouping private or public research institutions and private companies working together on specific research fields.

The school carries out both academic and industrial research, especially for the education of its students through partnership with companies (research contracts), in 14 laboratories and research departments.

Supélec has its own research teams and mixed units with CNRS and partner universities. Supélec is also involved in 5 doctoral schools with its partner universities (Paris Sud, Rennes 1, Nancy 1, Nancy 2, Metz).

In 2007, Supélec obtained along with Centrale Paris the label Carnot, a label of excellence awarded by Agence nationale de la recherche (National Agency for Research) to research institutions in France and intended to finance research.

In 2008, €8.6 million were invested in research, €6 million of which came from research contracts with 122 partner companies and institutions.

=== Industry connections ===
Partnerships with the industry have always been a priority. In 1986, Supélec founded the Teaching and Research Partnership in Cooperation with Business (PERCI&S), a network of privileged companies, in order to widen the openings to graduates and to develop research involving students. Members of PERCI include Accenture, Alcatel-Lucent, Areva, EADS, Hewlett-Packard, BNP Paribas, Siemens, EDF, Capgemini, among 36 companies in total.

The implication of the students in the industry is stressed, as they are required to complete at least 3 hands-on internships during their three years of studies, one of which is a 5-month-long project work or industrial research contract in a company.

Every year in early December, a job fair is held at Palais des Congrès in Paris and managed by Forum Centrale-Supélec, a student society.

=== Partnership agreements with other institutions ===
Centrale Paris and Supélec signed an outline agreement in 2005 in order to mutualize third year majors. Both of the schools already enrolled students at the end of Preparatory class through a common examination; they now share a common major in Energy. Since 2005 their cooperation has been strengthened, especially in research and industrial partnerships (the awarding of the label Carnot to the Centrale-Supélec-CNRS (C3S) grouping is a significant result). In 2008, they declare their partnership a strategic alliance.

Supélec students can choose to spend a non-graduating semester or graduate from one of the school's partner universities, in France or abroad. Among them, Supélec and ESCP Europe have developed a partnership giving Supélec students the opportunity to graduate with a Master in Business. Other specialization degrees exist with IFP School, or Paris-Sud 11 University.

One of the objectives of the institution for the period 2006-2009 was to reinforce the internationalization of the school by encouraging students to spend at least a semester abroad or to do a double-degree program in one of the Supélec's foreign partner universities, and by increasing the number of foreign students at Supélec.

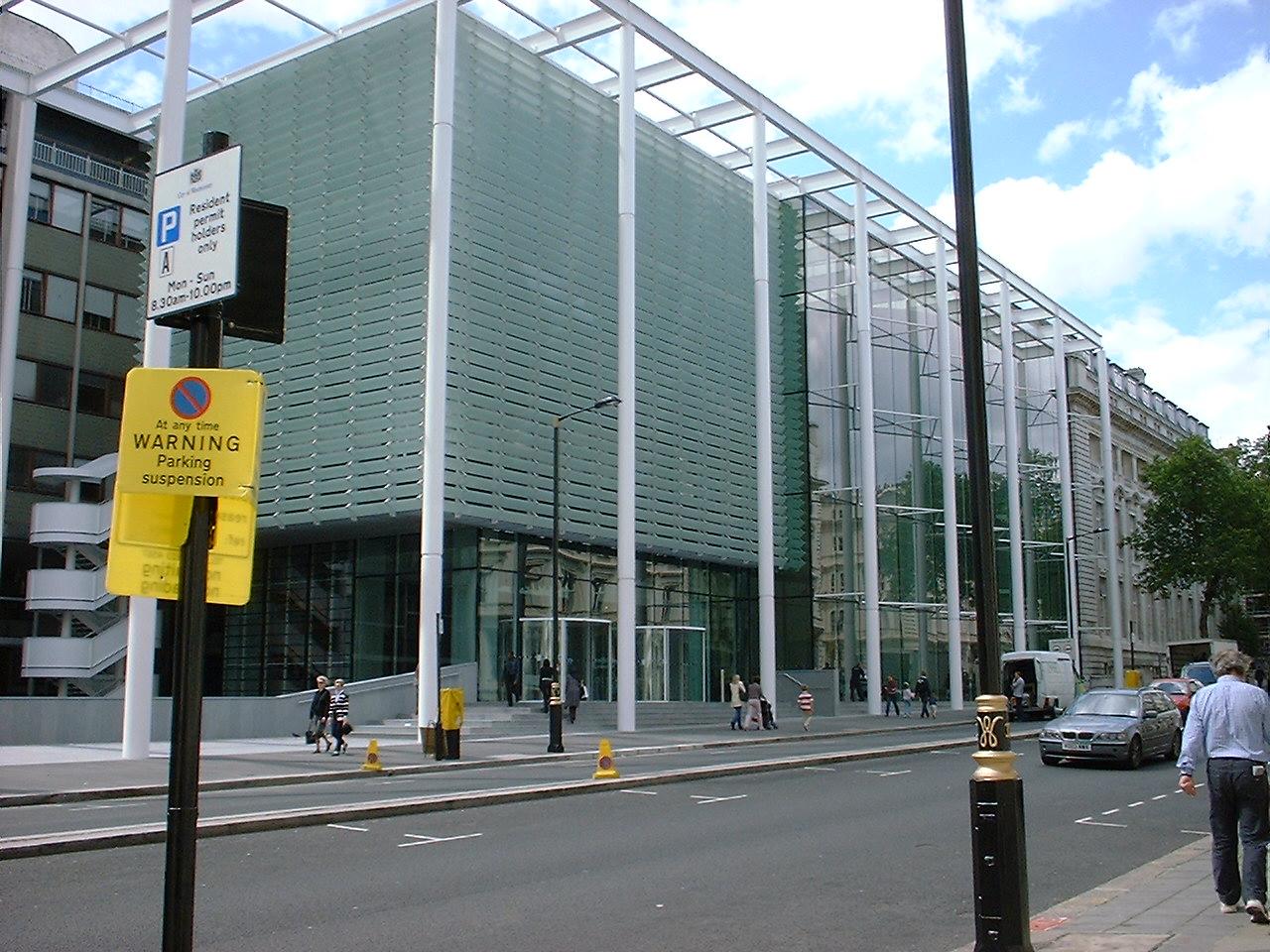
Imperial College main entrance

Agreements have been reached with other institutions of higher education whereby a number of Supélec students attend courses provided by these establishments instead of completing their third year at the school. The successful completion of these studies is a condition for obtaining the Supélec engineering degree in addition to the diploma related to the course of study in question. Agreements exist with a large number of departments in American, Australian, Canadian, Japanese and European universities. Among them, Georgia Tech, Columbia University, Ecole Polytechnique de Montréal, National University of Singapore, Imperial College London, Technical University of Munich.

Supélec has agreements and exchanges with more than 70 foreign universities, in over 30 countries and runs the Top Industrial Managers for Europe (T.I.M.E) network and is a member of the CESAER Association and n+i engineering institutes. In 2008, 40% of graduates have obtained double-degrees and 35% completed their final year of study abroad.

=== Key Figures (2008) ===
Overview:

- Revenues : €35 million
- Alumni Association Budget : €12 million

Students:

- 2,000 Students
- 460 Engineering degrees
- 6 Specialized Master programs
- 250 Doctoral students

International:

- 1 out of 5 graduates is international
- Supélec has agreements and exchanges with more than 70 foreign universities, in over 30 countries
- Supélec runs the Top Industrial Managers for Europe (T.I.M.E) network and is a member of the CESAER and n+i engineering institutes
- 40% of graduates have obtained double degrees
- 25% of graduates were foreign students, coming from 22 countries

Faculty and Staff:

- 130 Full-time faculty
- 650 Part-time teachers
- 175 Administrators and staff

Research:

- 14 laboratories and research departments
- 465 research personnel
- 725 major international publications and conference papers
- 17 patents
- 320 outgoing projects
- 122 partner companies and institutions
- €8.6 million in research funding

== Student life ==
=== Recreation ===
At the Gif-sur-Yvette campus, several activities are provided by the associations:

- The 'Bureau des Eleves' (BdE) and some other associations (Forum, Junior Entreprise, etc.) organize parties on a regular basis;
- The 'Bureau des Sports' enables students to practise sports. Since the Gif-sur-Yvette campus is equipped with a soccer pitch, a tennis court, a gymnasium, etc., students are able to play most common sports in France. Moreover, every Thursday afternoon, competitions between different French schools and universities are organized.

=== Housing ===
All the Supelec campus own housing amenities for the students.

Gif-sur-Yvette campus is composed of three types of residences:

- Residence 1: this residence is the oldest one. Most of students living there are first-year students. Each student has his own room. Bathrooms are shared by two students, and kitchen by about twenty students.
- Residence 2: this residence is made up by four buildings. Each building is composed of several flats for five or six students. In each flat, there are three or four restrooms, and a large living room.
- Residence 3: this residence is made up by flats for one person or for pairs.

== Events ==
Every year, many events are organized by Supelec students:

- In September, first year and many second year students take part in a WEI;
- In October, the Gala Supelec happens;
- In December, most famous companies participate in the Forum Supelec;
- In January, the Campagne BdE happens;
- Etc.

=== Forum Supelec ===
The forum Supelec is an event bringing together many famous companies: EDF, Renault, BNP Paribas, PSA, CapGemini, Accenture, Mazars, Logica, etc. This event takes place in Supelec every year, at Gif-sur-Yvette campus. It is a good opportunity for many students to find an internship.

== Campus ==
=== Gif-sur-Yvette ===
Gif-sur-Yvette is the main and biggest campus. It is located on the Plateau du Moulon, an important site for French education. Currently, other famous French Graduate Schools are building their campus there: ENS Paris-Saclay, Ecole Centrale Paris, etc. Many activities can be performed in the Gif-sur-Yvette campus: jogging, tennis, basketball, pool, etc.

=== Rennes ===
This campus is located in the periphery of Rennes. It features wide green spaces and is well linked to the center: 15 minutes by public transport makes it ideal for students who want to profit from the rich student life of the city. It is also close to other schools like the University of Rennes 1 and 2 and INSA.

=== Metz ===
The campus is located on the Technopole Metz 2000, next to other institutions such as Georgia Tech Lorraine and ENSAM.

== Alumni ==
Supélec alumni include: Pierre Bézier, Pierre Boulle, Thierry Breton, Louis Charles Breguet, Henri Chrétien, Jean Deleage, Maryline Hélard, Jeannine Henaff, Hervé Laborne, Jean-Luc Lagardère, René Leduc, Philippe Morillon, Dinh Thuy Phan Huy, Ambroise Roux, Pierre Schaeffer, Dominique Vidal and Jean-Baptiste Waldner.

== See also ==
- Centrale-Supélec Career Fair
- Education in France
- Grandes Ecoles
- Classe Préparatoire aux Grandes Ecoles
