= National Institute of Applied Science and Technology =

Coordinates: 36.84°N 10.197°E

INSAT
- Institut National des Sciences Appliquées et de Technologie المعهد الوطني للعلوم التطبيقية والتكنولوجيا
- Type: Public
- Established: 1996
- Director: Slah Ouerhani
- Students: 3,505
- Location: INSAT Centre Urbain Nord BP 676 - 1080 Tunis Cedex, Tunis
- Language: French
- Website: insat.rnu.tn

The National Institute of Applied Sciences and Technology (INSAT) is a Tunisian institute that is affiliated with the University of Carthage. Admission is very competitive and generally students must hold a very good GPA on the national exam to be admitted. Training technicians and engineers, it provides a post-baccalaureate education over a period of three and five years. Starting with two main branches CBA in French or ACB (Applied-Chemistry-Biology) and MPI in French or MPC (Math-Physics-Computer science) for the first year of integrated preparatory cycle, further branching to 2 tracks for ACB students, and 4 tracks for MPC students.

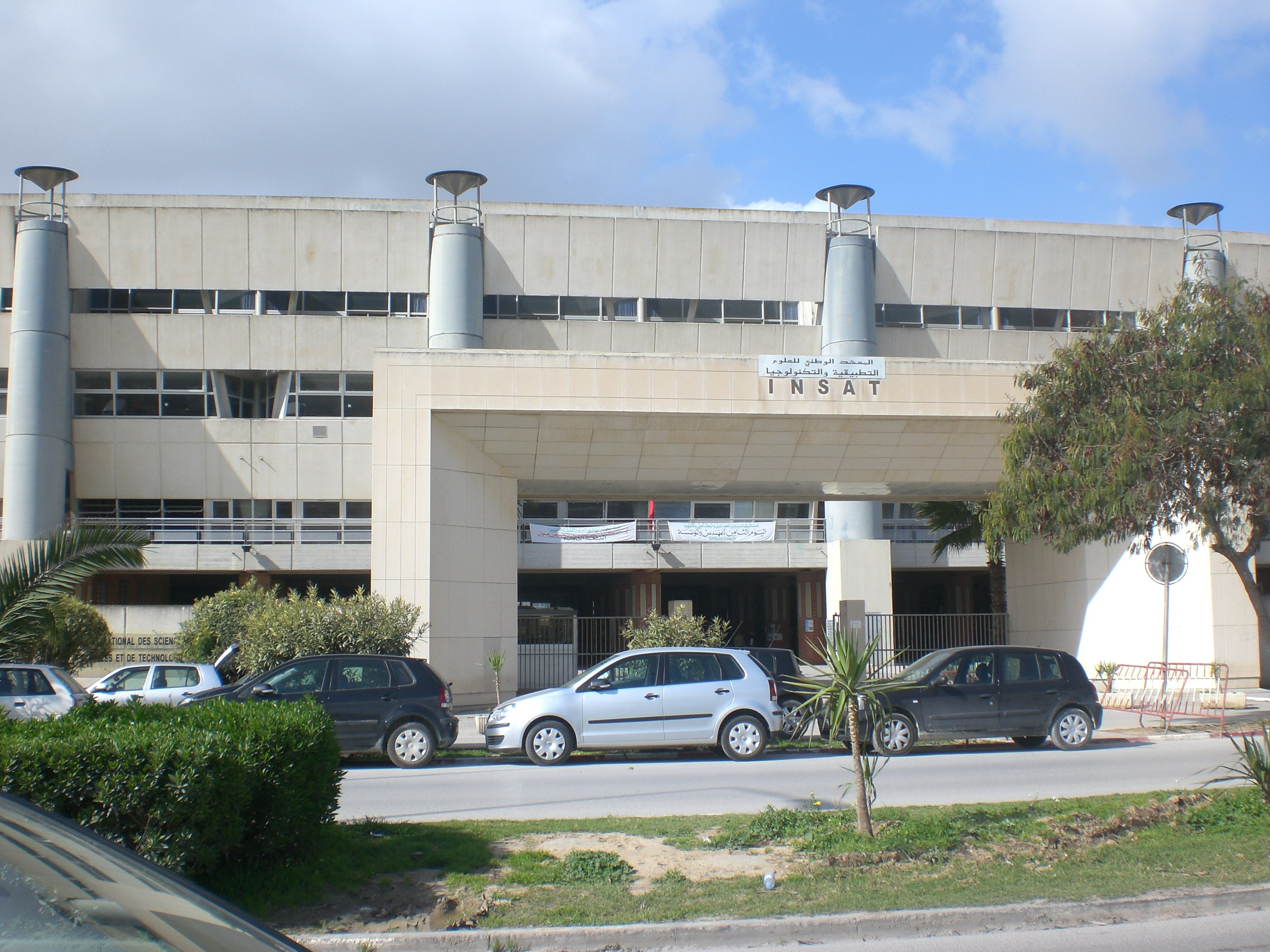

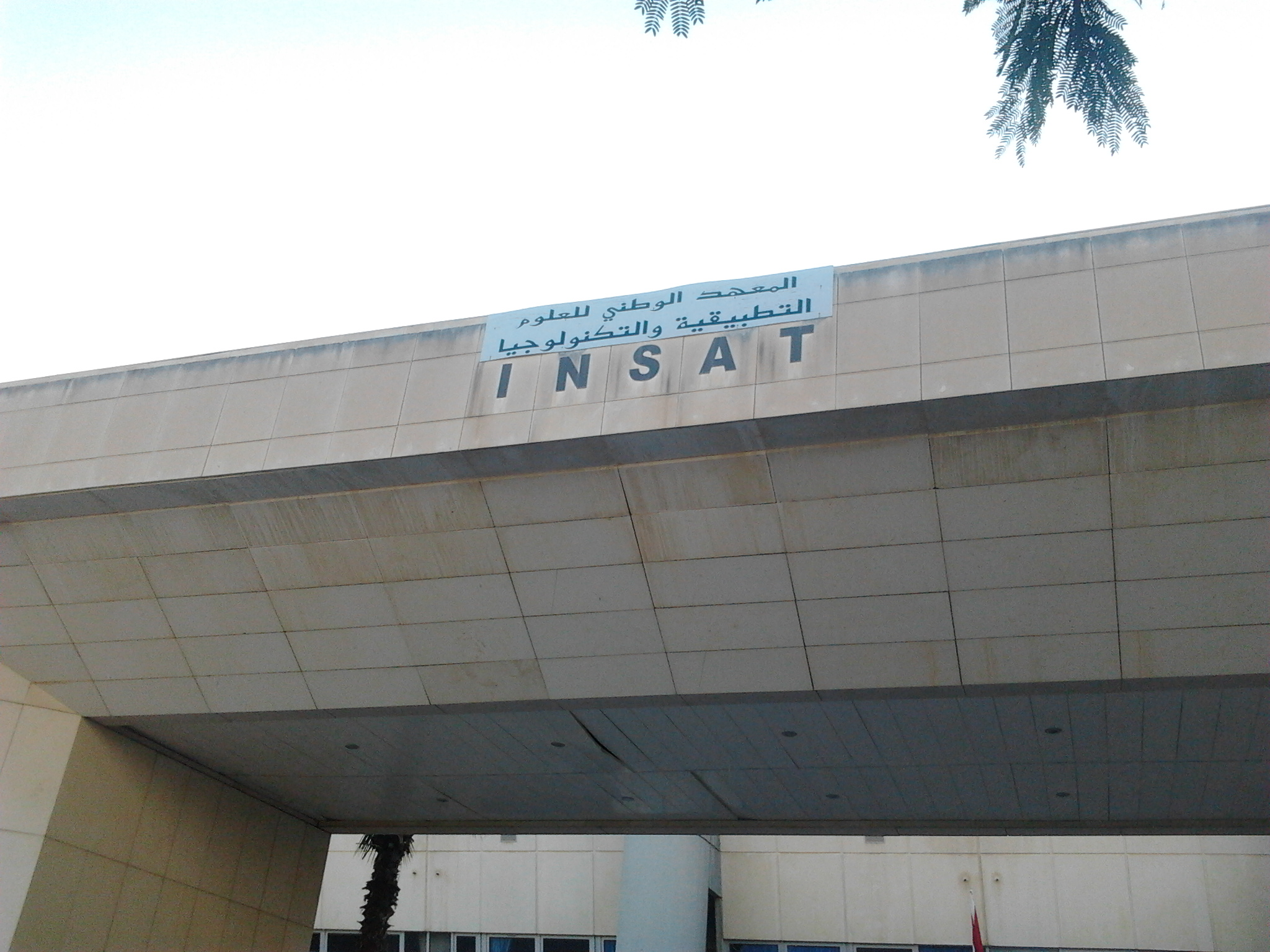

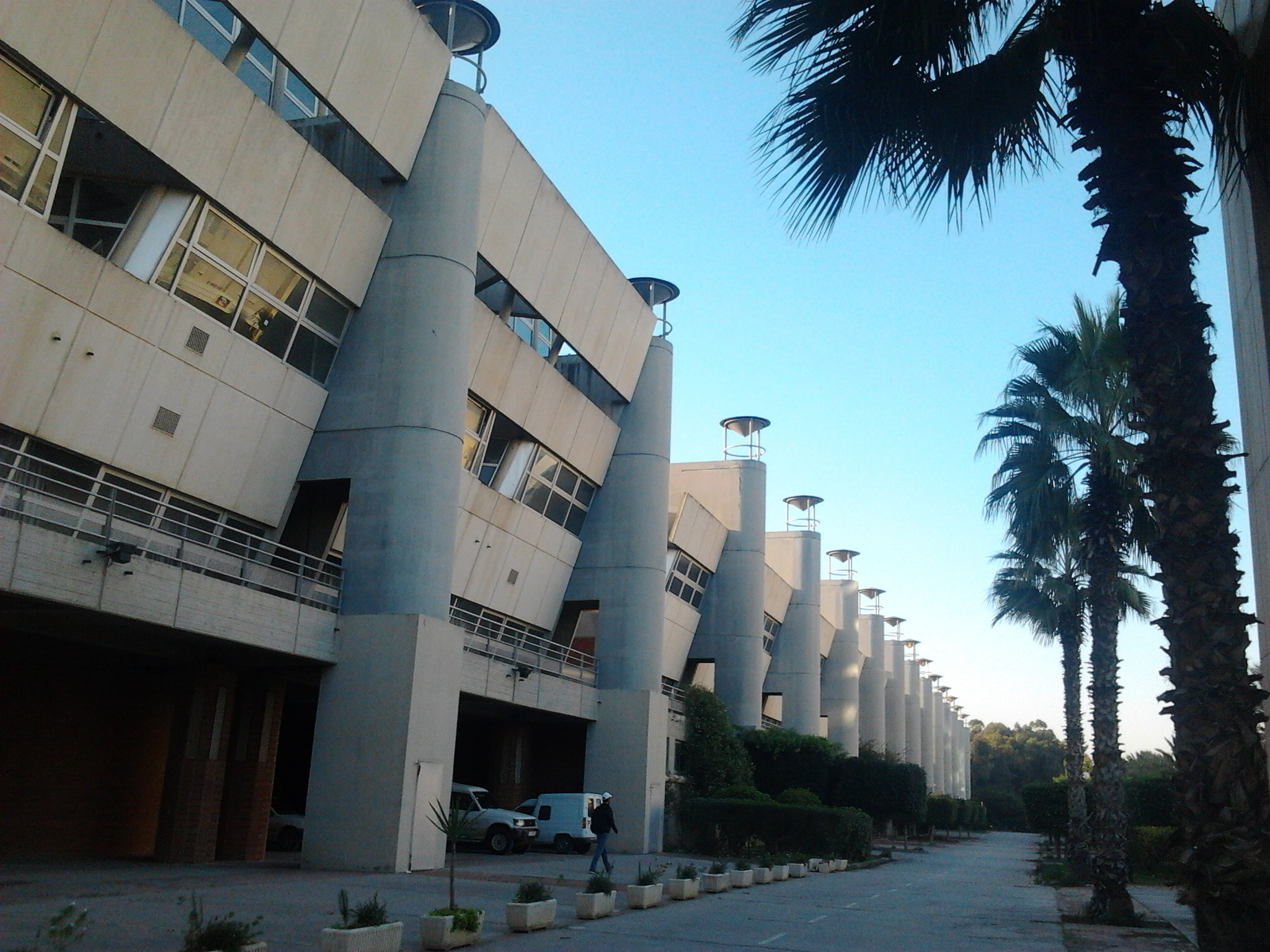

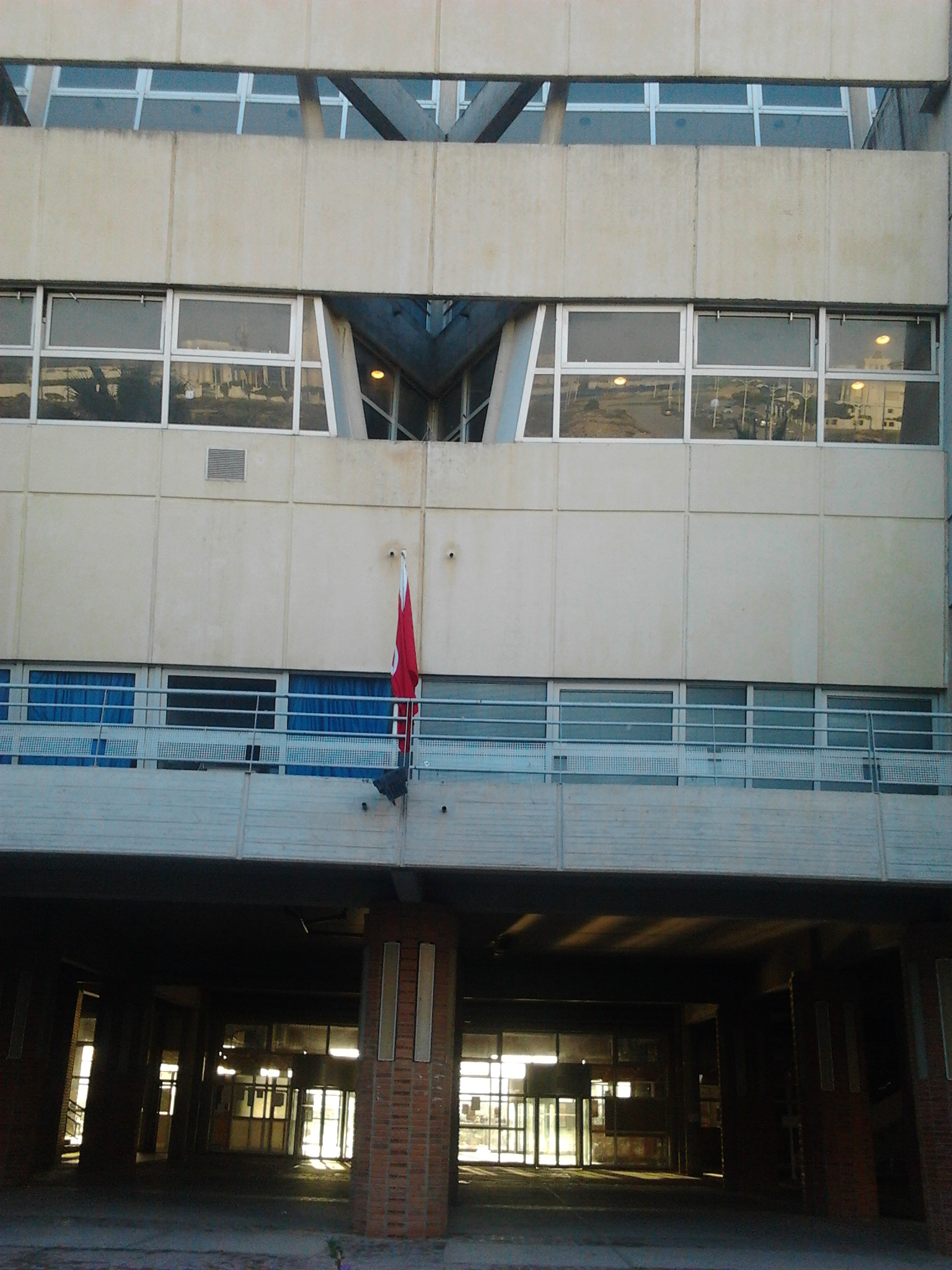

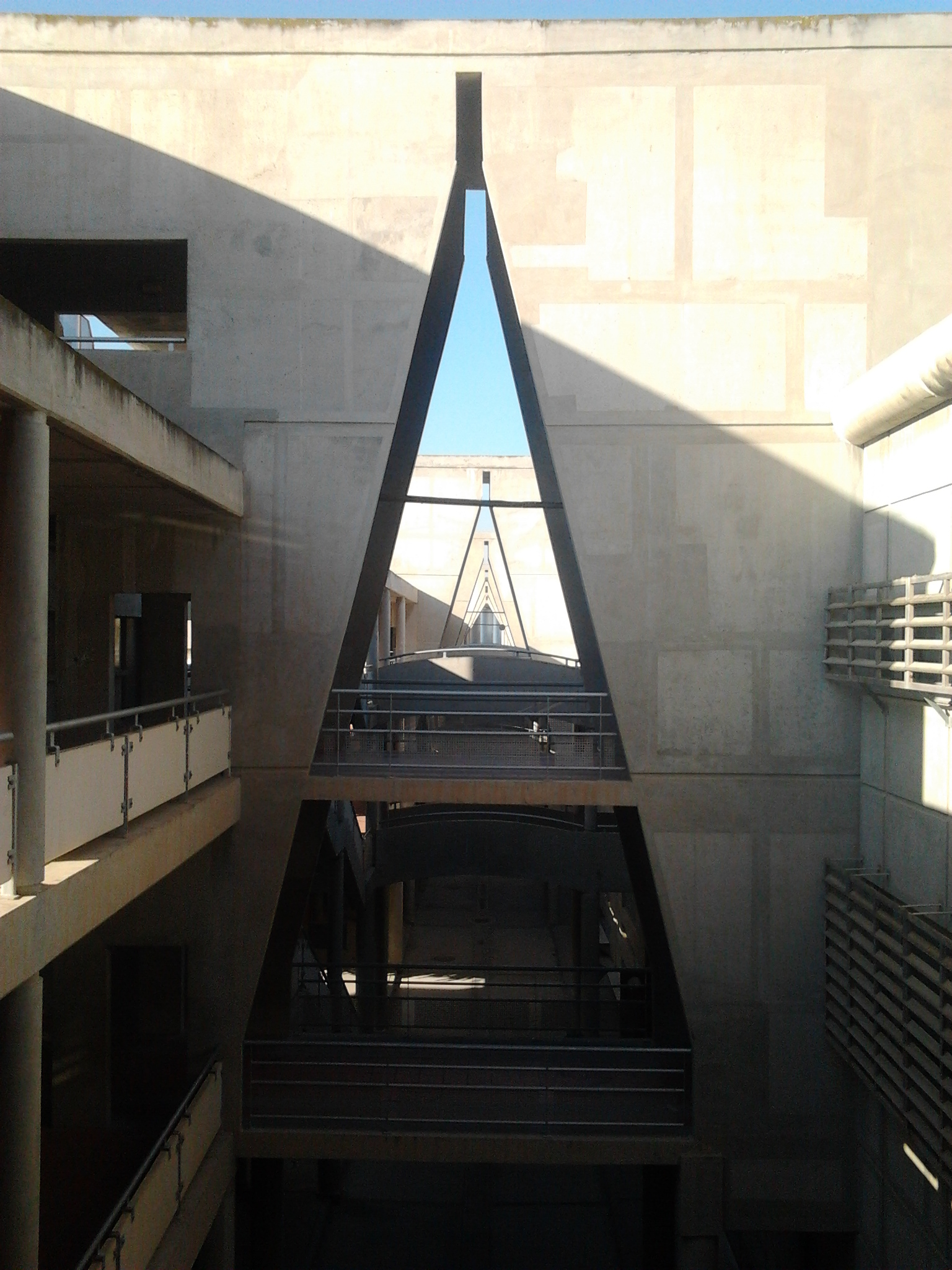

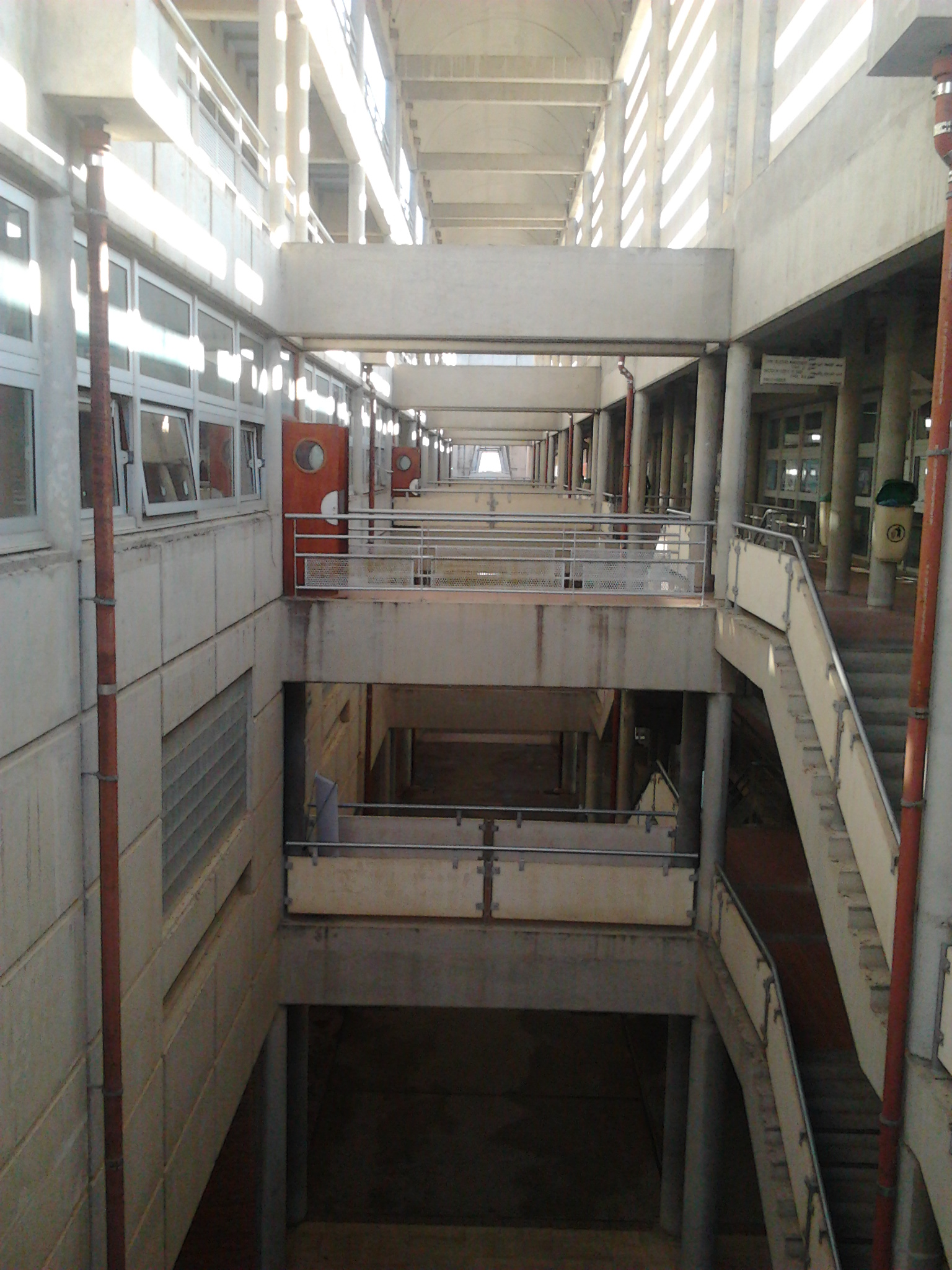

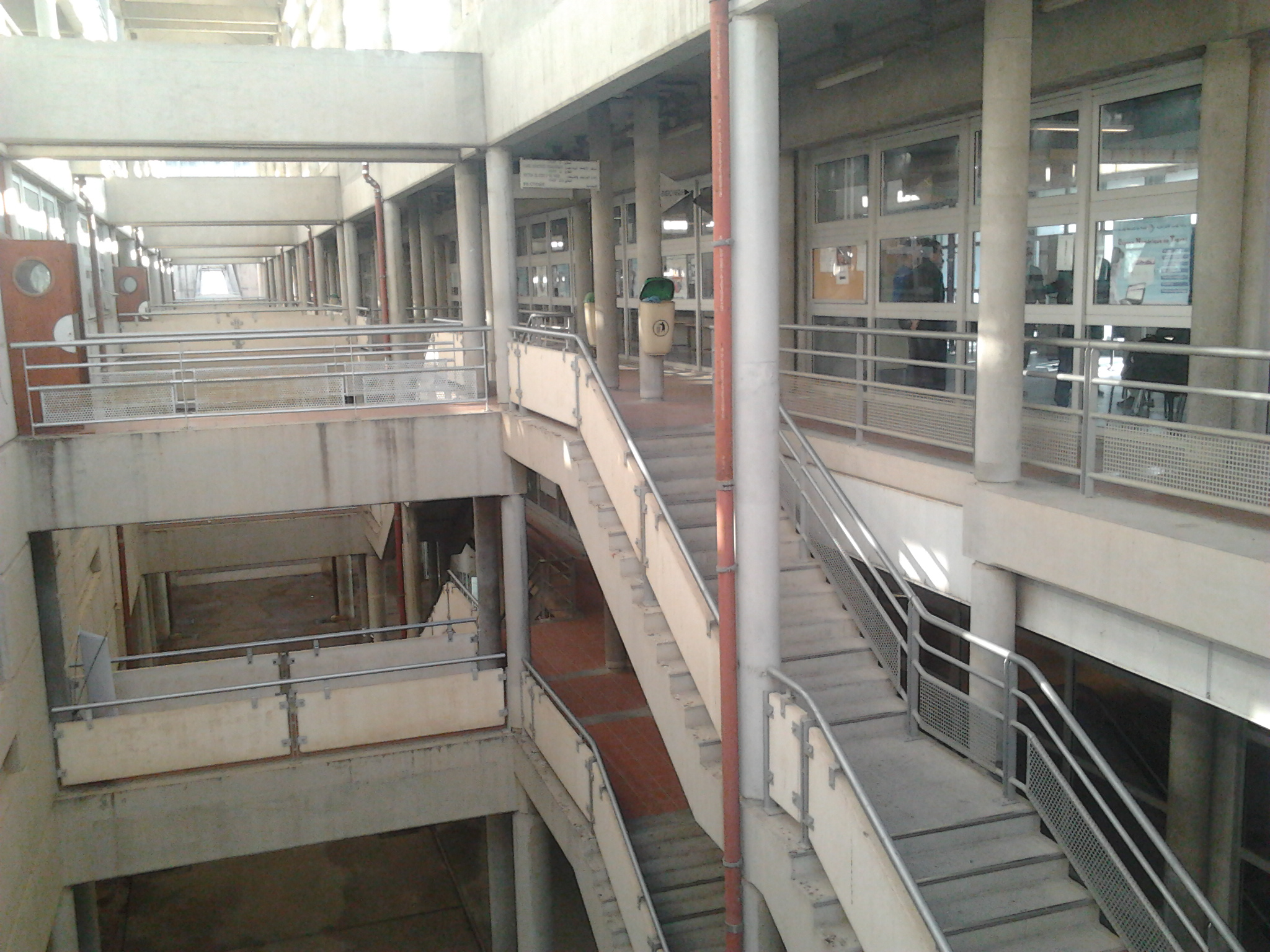
