= CentraleSupélec =

French graduate engineering school

Coordinates: 48.7092659°N 2.1635629°E

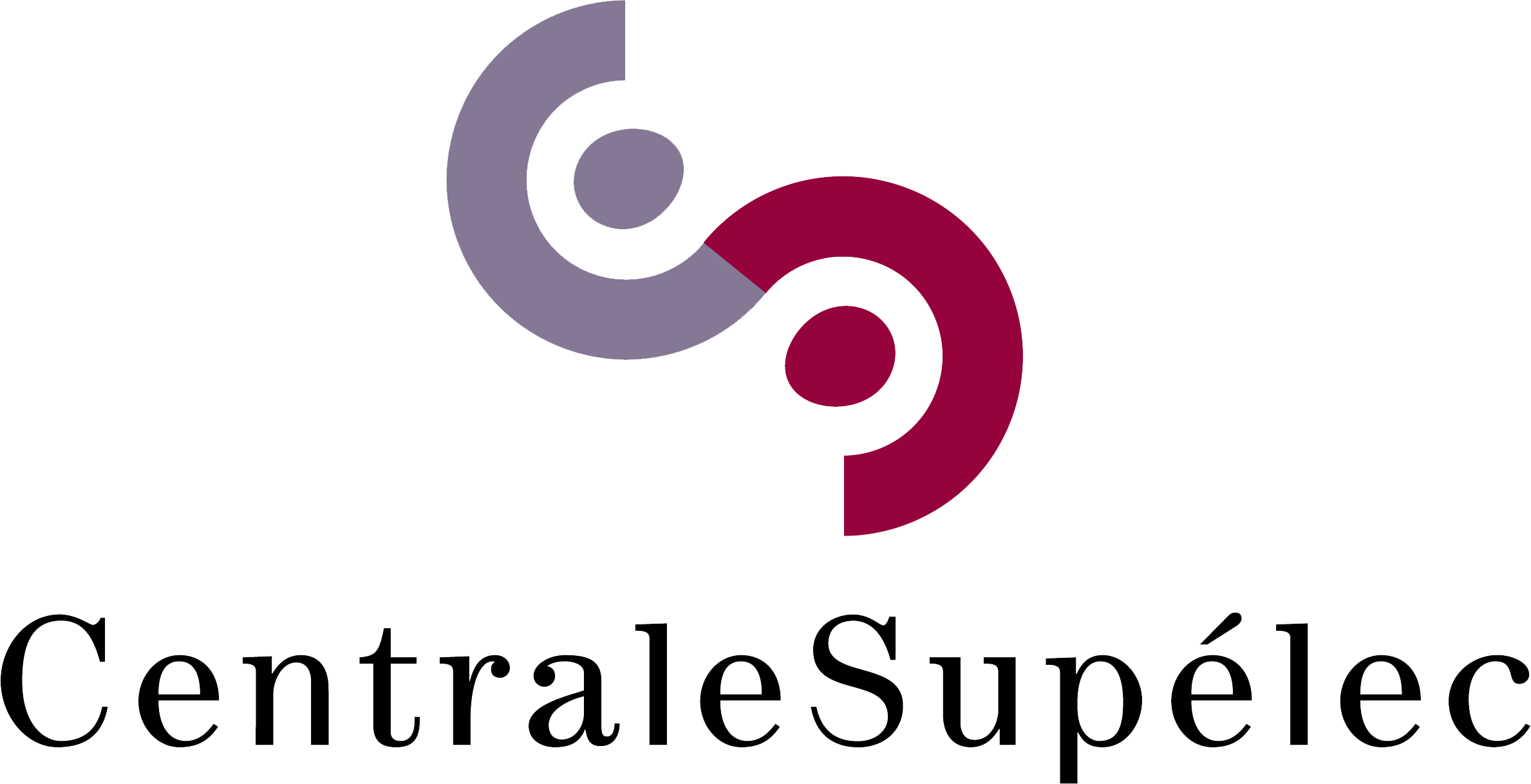
- Type: Grande école Grand établissement
- Established: 1829 (École Centrale Paris); 1894 (Supélec); 2015 : merger of both schools
- Parent institution: Paris-Saclay University
- Affiliations: Université Paris-Saclay, TIME, CESAER
- Budget: € 100 million
- President: Romain Soubeyran
- Faculty: 852
- Postgraduates: 5,350 (1,000 Engineers/year)
- Location: Gif-sur-Yvette, Metz, Rennes, France
- Website: www.centralesupelec.fr

The CentraleSupélec (CS) is a grande école in Gif-sur-Yvette, France. It is one of the constituent members of Paris-Saclay University. It was established on 1 January 2015, as a result of merger between two prestigious grandes écoles, École Centrale Paris and Supélec. CentraleSupélec is considered to be among the best engineering schools in France and Europe, with an admission rate of 8% in 2019.

It is a key founding member of the Paris-Saclay University, the TIME (Top Industrial Managers for Europe) network and also the CESAER association of European engineering schools.

Campuses CentraleSupélec

== History ==
=== École Centrale des Arts et Manufactures ===
École Centrale Paris was founded in 1829 on a private initiative by Alphonse Lavallée, who financed its creation and became its first president, and three distinguished scientists: Eugène Peclet, Jean-Baptiste Dumas, and Théodore Olivier. The founding vision was to promote the development of 'industrial science', or practical applications of recent major scientific discoveries, and to educate multidisciplinary engineers to lead the emerging industrial sector. The institution was offered to the French state in 1857.

Initially located in the Hôtel de Juigné (now Hôtel Salé and home to the Musée Picasso), it was transferred to rue Montgolfier in 1884. It stayed there until 1969, when it relocated to Châtenay-Malabry, near the Parc de Sceaux. It moved to its current location in 2015.

=== École Supérieure d'Electricité ===
Supélec was founded in 1894 by Eleuthère Mascart, a prominent academic who was elected as a Perpetual Member and Secretary of the Académie des Sciences and Foreign Member of the British Royal Society. He was also a professor at the Collège de France, and recipient of the Bordin Prize in 1866 as well as the Grand prix de l'Académie des sciences in 1874. Supélec was created in order to educate engineers for the then booming electrical industry.

Supélec was originally based in Rue de Staël, 15th district of Paris. It was then relocated to Malakoff close to Porte de Vanves, and Gif-sur-Yvette in 1975, where the main campus is currently located. A second campus was established in Rennes in 1972 and a third in Metz in 1985.

=== CentraleSupélec Alliance ===
Since December 2008, a strategic alliance was announced between the two schools, known today through the joint name of CentraleSupélec. Hervé Biausser became the director in 2013, 1 September, while keeping the directorship of Centrale Paris. CentraleSupélec now has three campuses in France: Gif-sur-Yvette, Metz and Rennes.

=== Part of the Paris-Saclay University ===
Since 2008, École Centrale Paris and Supélec have participated in the creation of the campus of the Paris-Saclay research cluster. The Paris-Saclay University is a French research university, which aims to become the top university of continental Europe in the ARWU rankings.

Since October 2023, the school has been a partner of IPSA for double degrees in aerospace.

The Paris-Saclay University was ranked 14th in the world in the 2020 Academic Ranking of World Universities (ARWU) ranking. In subject rankings, it was placed first in the world for Mathematics and 9th in the world for Physics (1st in Europe), as well as receiving a top 25 place for Medicine and Agriculture.

== Academics ==
=== Admission ===
The majority of students admitted to the engineer's degree program are selected among candidates from French preparatory classes, which is usually a two to three-year post-secondary program with a focus on certain subjects such as Mathematics, Physics, Chemistry, Engineering Sciences, and Industrial Sciences. The numbers vary over the years, but in 2025 CentraleSupélec offers 225 places in the Mathematics and Physics program (MP), 145 places in the Physics and Chemistry program (PC), 137 places in the Physics and Engineering Sciences program (PSI), 25 places in the Physics and Technology program (PT), 5 places in the Technology and Industrial Sciences program (TSI), and several for other programs (BCPST and MPI tracks). The acceptance rate was 8% for MP students, 6% for PC students and 7% for PSI students in 2020. The school also recruits top students from overseas partner universities as well as some graduates of French public universities to join the engineer's degree program.

Before 2018, students at CentraleSupélec were admitted to either the Centralien or Supélec engineer's degree programs (but not both), and consequently students enrolled before this year receive the academic degree bearing the name of their respective engineer program upon graduation. On the other hand, all engineering students admitted in 2018 and onward are placed in a 'unified' engineer program and graduate with the same academic degree

=== Rankings ===
University rankings

Global – Overall
- ARWU World: 13 (2026)

CentraleSupélec is considered to be among the best engineering schools of France, some ranking it second just below Polytechnique. According to several salary surveys, graduates from both the Ecole Centrale and Supelec Engineering Programs are among the highest-paid in France. As part of Paris-Saclay University, it has been ranked 13th in the Academic Ranking of World Universities 2026.

== Notable alumni ==
- Stéphane Bancel, CEO of Moderna
- Carlos Tavares, CEO of Stellantis
- Olivier Pomel and Alexis Lê-Quôc, co-founders of Datadog
- Sergei Bernstein, mathematician
- Boris Vian, novelist, poet, playwright, journalist, musician...
- Gustave Eiffel, architect of the Eiffel Tower
- André Michelin, founder of Michelin and creator of the Michelin Guide
