= Pôle de recherche et d'enseignement supérieur =

French university associations known as "pôles de recherche et d'enseignement supérieur" (PRES; English: centers for research and higher education) were a form of higher-level organization for universities and other institutions established by French law in effect from 2007 to 2013. The 2013 Law on Higher Education and Research (France) discontinued the PRES; these have been largely replaced by the new Communities of Universities and Institutions (French translation abbreviated COMUE). The list below indicates the status of those institutions designated as PRES or related associations before the 2013 law took effect. See the list of public universities in France for the current status of these institutions.

== History ==
The reforms of French higher education in 1968–1971 broke apart several public universities into numerous autonomous successor universities. For example, the University of Paris was split into thirteen universities, Paris I through Paris XIII. These universities have subsequently formed groupings in order to pool resources and better advance their joint activities. Some of these groupings, which typically take the legal form of a groupement d'interêt public, or GIP, are themselves called universities or university centers. In addition to universities, they may include other institutions of higher education and research as well as municipal and regional governments. The process has accelerated with the law of 18 April 2006 on the reform of research in France. This has permitted the creation of tighter groupings called pôles de recherche et d'enseignement supérieur, or PRES. In addition, there are a number of consortia of engineering schools, such as the Grenoble Institute of Technology, that are so tightly united as to be listed as if they were single universities by the Ministry of Higher Education and Research.

== Bordeaux ==
Systems and consortiums in Bordeaux:

=== University of Bordeaux ===
The present University of Bordeaux (Université de Bordeaux) is a PRES, established 21 March 2007, made up of the four successor universities to the former University of Bordeaux as well as a number of other institutions:

1. University of Bordeaux 1 (Université Bordeaux 1 Sciences Technologies or Bordeaux 1)
2. Victor Segalen Bordeaux 2 University (Université Victor Segalen Bordeaux 2)
3. Michel de Montaigne University Bordeaux 3 (Université Michel de Montaigne Bordeaux 3)
4. Montesquieu University - Bordeaux IV (Université Montesquieu – Bordeaux IV)
5. ENSEIRB (Ecole nationale supérieure d’électronique, informatique et radiocommunications de Bordeaux)
6. ENSCPB (Ecole nationale supérieure de chimie et de physique de Bordeaux)
7. Sciences Po Bordeaux (Institut d’études politiques de Bordeaux)
8. Bordeaux Sciences Agro

=== Bordeaux University Center ===
The Bordeaux University Center (Pôle universitaire de Bordeaux) is a GIP, made up of the four successor universities to the former University of Bordeaux, along with municipal and regional governments. The four universities are:

1. University of Bordeaux 1 (Université Bordeaux 1 Sciences Technologies or Bordeaux 1)
2. Victor Segalen Bordeaux 2 University (Université Victor Segalen Bordeaux 2)
3. Michel de Montaigne University Bordeaux 3 (Université Michel de Montaigne Bordeaux 3)
4. Montesquieu University - Bordeaux IV (Université Montesquieu – Bordeaux IV)

== Cergy-Pontoise ==
The Cergy-Pontoise University as well as all upper education institutions of Cergy-Pontoise are organized in a PRES (Research and Upper Education Pole) including :

- Cergy-Pontoise University
- CY Tech
- groupe ESSEC,(École Supérieure des Sciences Économiques et Commerciales)
- ENSEA, Ecole Nationale Supérieure de l'Electronique et de ses Applications
- ITIN, Ecole supérieure d’Informatique, Réseaux et Systèmes d’Information
- ENSAPC, École nationale supérieure d'arts de Cergy-Pontoise
- EBI (École de Biologie Industrielle)
- EPMI ( École d'électricité, de Production et des Méthodes Industrielles)
- EPSS (École Pratique de Service Social)
- ESCOM (École supérieure de chimie organique et minérale)
- ILEPS (Institut Libre d’Éducation Physique Supérieur)
- ISTOM (Institut Supérieur d’agro-développement)
- ESCIA, école supérieure de comptabilité, gestion et finance

== Clermont-Ferrand ==
- University of Auvergne or University Clermont I
  - Faculty of Law and Political Science at Faculty of Economics and Management
  - Faculty of Medicine
  - Faculty of Pharmacy
  - Faculty of Dental Surgery
  - IUT (Engineering Sciences, Computer Networks, Multimedia, Biology, Management)
  - IUP "Management and Business Management"
  - Institute of Preparation for General Administration (IPAG)
- Blaise Pascal University or University Clermont II
  - Arts and Humanities
  - Engineering
  - Language and Cultural Studies
  - Science and Technology

== Grenoble ==
Systems and consortiums in Grenoble:

=== University of Grenoble ===
The University of Grenoble was a French university founded in 1339. There are three present-day successor universities:

1. Joseph Fourier University (formerly Grenoble 1)
2. Pierre Mendès-France University (formerly Grenoble 2)
3. Stendhal University (formerly Grenoble 3)

The present University of Grenoble is a project of these three universities, together in the Grenoble Universités consortium with the Grenoble Institute of Technology, to place aspects of research, instruction, and support under joint administration. This project was formally established in November 2006, with the aim of starting work in 2007 and having the new University of Grenoble take over the tasks of the Grenoble Universités consortium by January 2009 at the latest.

=== Grenoble Universités ===
Grenoble Universités is a GIP, made up of the following four institutions:

1. Joseph Fourier University
2. Pierre Mendès-France University
3. Stendhal University
4. Grenoble Institute of Technology

=== Grenoble Institute of Technology ===
The Grenoble Institute of Technology (le groupe INP Grenoble, l'Institut national polytechnique de Grenoble or INPG) is a consortium of six engineering schools:

1. Ense3 (l'École nationale supérieure de l'énergie, l'eau et l'environnement, formerly ENSHMG and ENSIEG)
2. Ensimag (l'École nationale supérieure d'informatique et de mathématiques appliquées de Grenoble, formerly ENSIMAG and le Département télécommunications)
3. Esisar (l'École nationale supérieure en systèmes avancés et réseaux, formerly l'École supérieure d'ingénieurs systèmes avancés Rhône-Alpes)
4. Génie industriel (Génie industriel, formerly ENSGI and ENSHMG)
5. Pagora (l'École internationale du papier, de la communication imprimée et des biomatériaux, formerly l'École française de papeterie et des industries graphiques or EFPG)
6. Phelma (l'École de physique, d'électronique et des matériaux, formerly ENSPG, ENSERG and ENSEEG)

It was established in 1971, along with the other two French national polytechnic institutes.

== Lille ==
Community of Universities and Institutions (COMUE) Lille Nord de France

It includes the following establishments :

- University of Lille (the main component)
- Artois University
- University of the Littoral Opal Coast
- University of Valenciennes and Hainaut-Cambresis
- École des Mines-Télécom de Lille-Douai (IMT)
- École centrale de Lille
- Lille Catholic University
- Centre national de la recherche scientifique (CNRS)
- French Institute for Research in Computer Science and Automation (INRIA)

Several institutions are associate members :

- Skema Business School
- CHU Lille University Hospital
- Institut national de la santé et de la recherche médicale (Inserm)
- École nationale supérieure des arts et industries textiles (ENSAIT)
- École nationale supérieure d'architecture et de paysage de Lille (ENSAPL)
- Arts et Métiers ParisTech (Lille Campus)
- École nationale supérieure de chimie de Lille (ENSCL)
- École supérieure d'art Dunkerque-Tourcoing (ESA)
- École supérieure de journalisme de Lille (ESJ Lille)
- Institut d'études politiques de Lille (Sciences Po Lille)
- Institut national de la recherche agronomique (INRA)
- Institut national de recherche sur les transports et leur sécurité (IFSTTAR)
- Institut Pasteur de Lille
- Institut français de recherche pour l'exploitation de la mer (IFREMER)
- Institut national de recherche sur les transports et leur sécurité (INRETS)
- Office national d'études et de recherches aérospatiales-Institut de mécanique des fluides de Lille (ONERA)
- Belgian universities and their research teams

It participates in 8 French competitiveness clusters.

139 research labs and institutes are associated to the European Doctoral College Lille Nord-de-France. Six doctoral schools are included with 3,000 registered PhD students.

== Lyon ==
There is the following consortium in Lyon:

=== University of Lyon ===
The University of Lyon (Université de Lyon) comprises 16 institutions:

1. Claude Bernard University Lyon 1
2. Lumière University Lyon 2
3. Jean Moulin University Lyon 3
4. École Normale Supérieure de Lyon
5. École normale supérieure lettres et sciences humaines
6. École Centrale de Lyon
7. INSA Lyon
8. École National Supérieure des Sciences de l'Information et des Bibliothèques (ENSSIB)
9. École Vétérinaire de Lyon
10. Université catholique de Lyon
11. École de Management de Lyon
12. Institut National de Recherche Pédagogique (INRP)
13. Institut Polytechnique de Lyon (CPE Lyon, ECAM Lyon, ISARA Lyon, ITECH Lyon)
14. Institut d'Études Politiques de Lyon
15. Institut Universitaire de Formation des Maîtres (IUFM) der Akademie Lyon
16. École Nationale des Travaux Publics de l'État

== Marseille ==
- University of Aix-Marseille
- Pôle universitaire de Bordeaux

== Montpellier ==
- University of Montpellier

== Nancy ==
- Nancy-Université, also known as University of Nancy, merged from these former entities:
  - European University Center of Lorraine (Pôle Universitaire Européen de Lorraine)
  - Université Henri Poincaré
  - Nancy 2 University
  - National Polytechnic Institute of Lorraine

== Pays de la Loire : Nantes Angers Le Mans ==
- L'Université Nantes Angers Le Mans

== Paris ==
- Paris Universitas (2005–2010, now dissolved)
- Sorbonne Universités
- Université Paris-Est
- Paris Centre Universités
- Université Paris-Est
- Polytechnicum de Marne-la-Vallée
- UniverSud Paris
- Polytech'Paris-UPMC
- Hautes Études-Sorbonne-Arts et Métiers

== Rennes ==
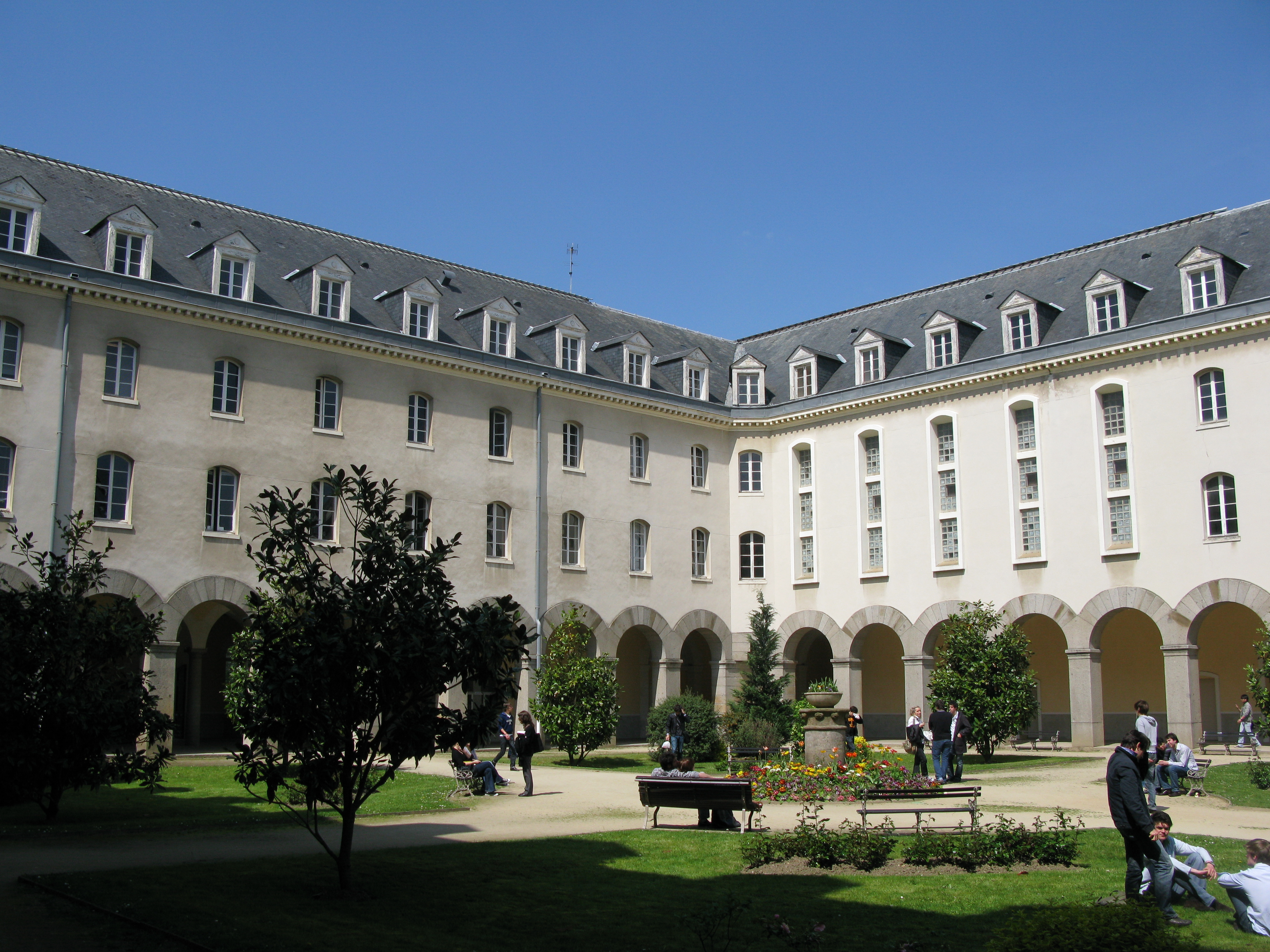
The university of Rennes 1, member of the Université européenne de Bretagne

- Université européenne de Bretagne:
  - University of Western Brittany, in Brest
  - University of Southern Brittany, in Lorient and Vannes
  - university of Rennes 1, in Rennes
  - University of Rennes 2 – Upper Brittany, in Rennes
  - AGROCAMPUS OUEST, in Rennes
  - École Normale Supérieure de Cachan's Ker Lann campus, in Rennes
  - École nationale supérieure de chimie de Rennes
  - INSA Rennes
  - TELECOM Bretagne, in Brest and Rennes

== Strasbourg ==
- University of Strasbourg

== Toulouse ==
There is the following consortium in Toulouse:

=== University of Toulouse ===
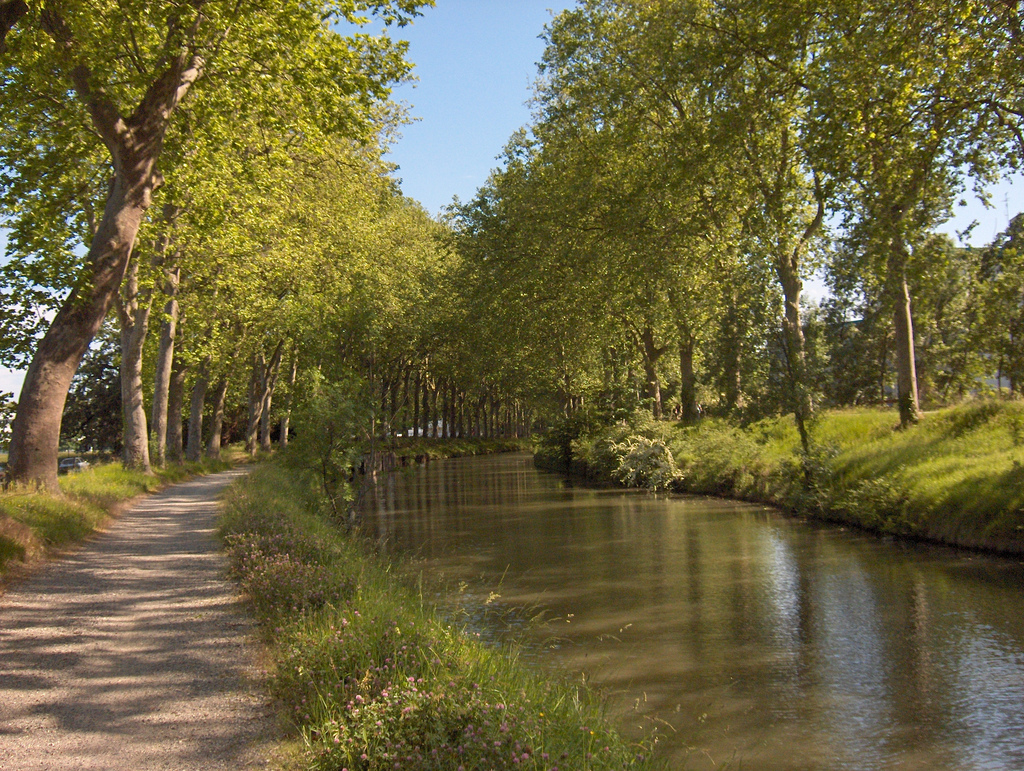
View of "canal du midi", near one of the university campus

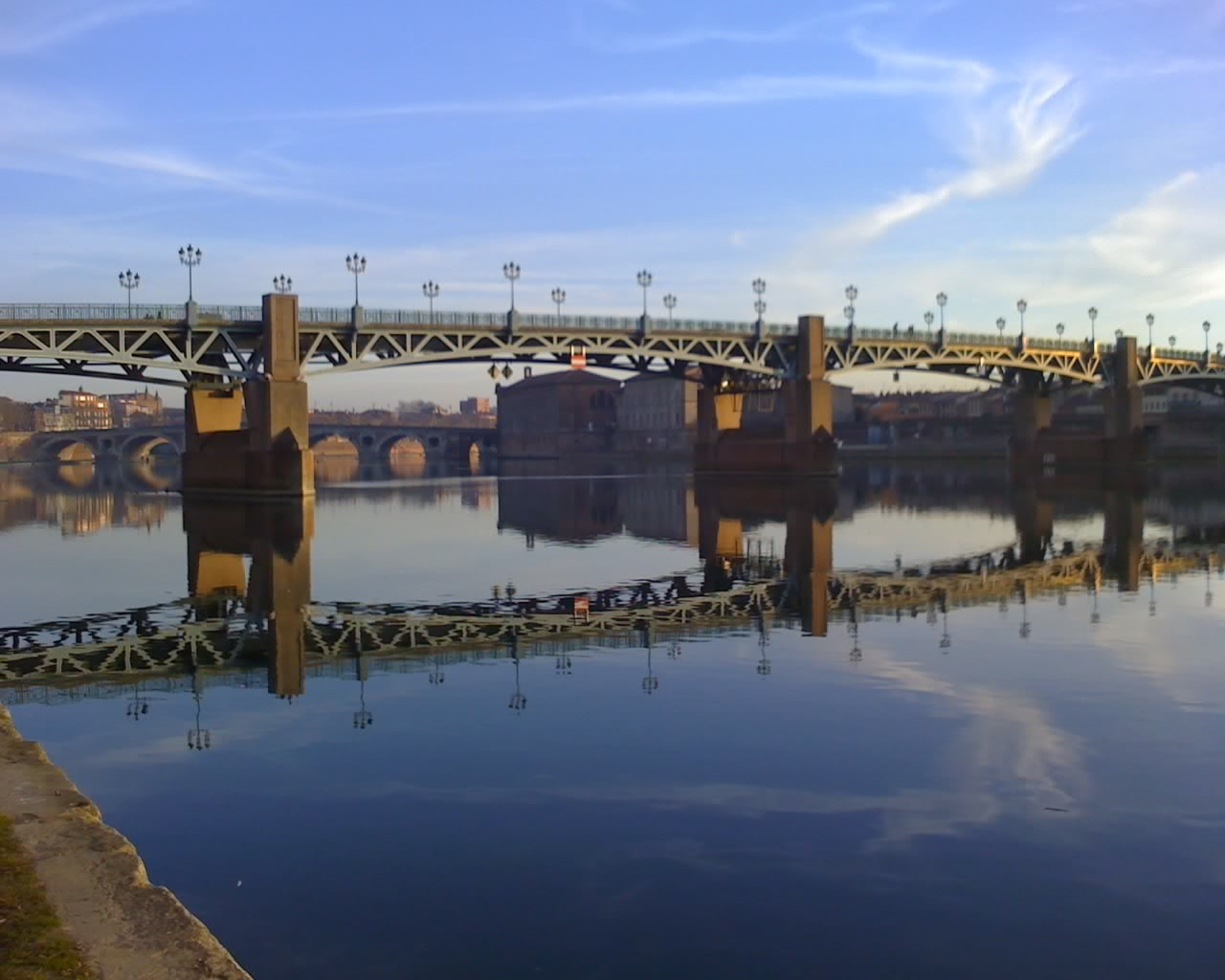
The banks of the Garonne close to the Toulouse City Center

The University of Toulouse (Université de Toulouse) is a Research and Higher Education Cluster (PRES) consisting of 14 institutions (universities and "grandes écoles"):

- University of Toulouse I: Capitole – UT1 (Law, Economics, Management)
- University of Toulouse II: Le Mirail – UT2 (Arts, Literature, Humanities and Languages)
- University of Toulouse III: Paul Sabatier – UT3 (Science, Technologies and Health)
- Institut National Polytechnique de Toulouse – INPT (Engineering)
  - École Nationale Supérieure Agronomique de Toulouse – INP-ENSAT (Agronomy)
  - École Nationale Supérieure d’Électrotechnique, d’Électronique, d’Informatique, d’Hydraulique et des Télécommunications – INP-ENSEEIHT (Engineering)
  - École Nationale Supérieure des Ingénieurs en Arts Chimiques et Technologiques – INP-ENSIACET (Engineering)
  - École Nationale d'Ingénieurs de Tarbes – INP-ENIT (Engineering)
  - École Nationale de la Météorologie;– INP-ENM (Meteorology)
  - École d'ingénieurs de Purpan – INP-EI Purpan (Engineering)
  - École Nationale Vétérinaire de Toulouse – ENVT (Veterinary Studies)
- Institut National des Sciences Appliquées de Toulouse – INSA Toulouse (Applied Sciences)
- Institut Supérieur de l'Aéronautique et de l'Espace – ISAE (Aeronautics and Space)
- Centre Universitaire de Formation et de Recherche Jean-François Champollion – CUFR Champollion (Several fields of study on offer)
- École des Mines d'Albi-Carmaux – EMAC (Engineering)
- École Nationale de l'Aviation Civile – ENAC (Civil Aviation)
- École Nationale de Formation Agronomique – ENFA (Agronomy)
- École Nationale Supérieur d'Architecture de Toulouse – ENSA Toulouse (Architecture)
- Toulouse Business School (TBS) (Business and Commerce)
- Institut d'études politiques de Toulouse – IEP/Sciences Po Toulouse (Political Studies)
- Institut Catholique d'Arts et Métiers de Toulouse – ICAM Toulouse (Engineering)

== See also ==
- List of public universities in France by academy
