= Toulouse Tech =

Grandes écoles network

- Motto: Réseau des Grandes Ecoles Technologies et Management
- Motto in English: Technology and Management grandes écoles network
- Type: grandes écoles network
- Established: 2007
- Affiliations: CDEFI, CGE
- President: Bruno Verlon
- Students: 14,000
- Location: Toulouse, France; 43°35′42″N 1°27′05″E
- Campus: Toulouse
- Website: www.toulousetech.net
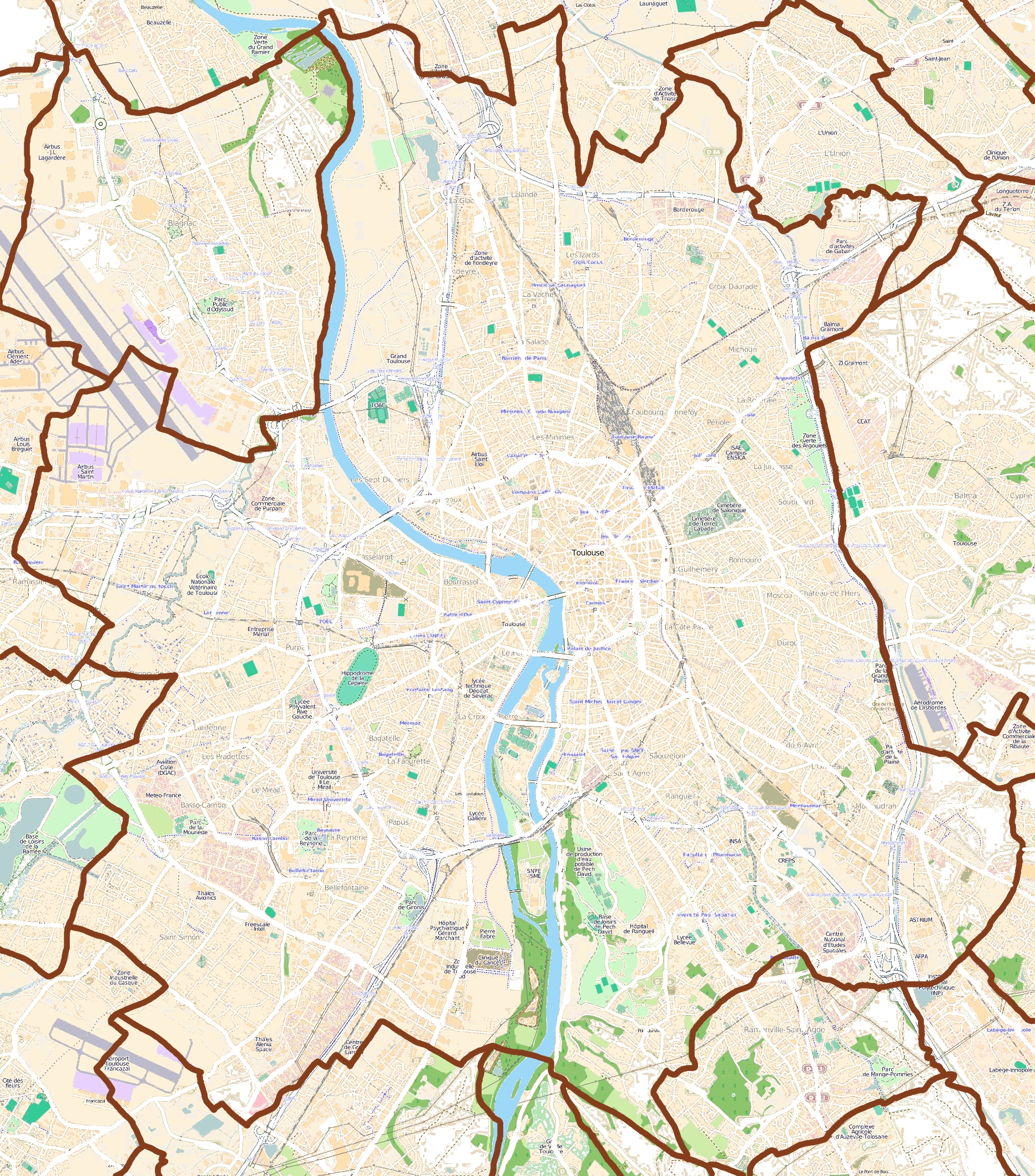
- Location within Toulouse Location within France

Toulouse Tech, also called the Toulouse Institute of Technology, is one of the grandes écoles network in France. Created in 2007, it gathers 16 French grandes écoles, covering engineering science, management, architecture and veterinary, aiming to be of comparable status to the most famous universities of technology around the world.

== Colleges and institutes ==
- École nationale de l'aviation civile
- École nationale supérieure de formation de l’enseignement agricole
- École nationale d'ingénieurs de Tarbes
- École nationale de la météorologie
- École nationale supérieure d'architecture de Toulouse
- École nationale supérieure en génie des technologies industrielles
- École des mines d'Albi-Carmaux
- École nationale vétérinaire de Toulouse
- École d'ingénieurs de Purpan
- Institut catholique d'arts et métiers
- École Nationale Supérieure Agronomique de Toulouse
- École Nationale Supérieure d'Électronique, d'Électrotechnique, d'Informatique, d'Hydraulique et des Télécommunications
- École nationale supérieure des ingénieurs en arts chimiques et technologiques
- Institut National des Sciences Appliquées de Toulouse
- Institut Supérieur de l'Aéronautique et de l'Espace

== Facts and figures ==
From the official website:

- 850 teachers-researchers
- 14,000 students
- 22 million euros in research
