= INPT =

INPT may refer to:

- Indigenous Nationalist Party of Twipra, political party in the Indian state of Tripura
- National Polytechnic Institute of Toulouse, French university system referred to as INPT
