= École Nationale Supérieure Agronomique de Toulouse =

French institution of higher education and research

Coordinates: 43°31′50″N 1°29′36″E

The École Nationale Supérieure Agronomique de Toulouse (French pronunciation: [ekɔl nɑsjɔnal sypeʁjœʁ aɡʁɔnɔmik də tuluz]; "Toulouse School of Agricultural and Life Sciences"; Occitan: Escòla de Tolosa de las Scienças Agricolas e de las Vida) is a French public and national Grande Ecole in agricultural and life sciences, funded by the Ministry of Higher Education and Research and member of Toulouse Tech. The ENSAT is a school of the National Polytechnic Institute of Toulouse (INPT), a university federating several schools dealing with engineering, agriculture and veterinary sciences, chemistry, meteorology.

ENSAT works with seven laboratories joint to INRA or CNRS, and several industrial partners.

== History ==
Founded in 1909 by Paul Sabatier, Nobel prize in chemistry, the institute became ENSAT in 1970 and joined forces with INP-ENSIACET and INP-ENSEEIHT to create the National Polytechnic Institute of Toulouse.

== Training ==
ENSAT's mission is to offer training, research and expertise, based on the specialities of the research teams: Food, Sustainable Agriculture, Biotechnology, Environment and Territories. International students have the opportunity to prepare for an Engineer's degree in Agricultural Sciences (equivalent to a master's degree), several master's degrees in Agricultural Sciences, Food Sciences or Environmental Sciences, and the possibility of completing a PhD.

== Research ==
There are seven research teams working on:

- Chemistry Laboratory (LGC)
- Impact of farming and forestry on ecosystems (DYNAFOR)
- Biogeochemical functions of ecosystems (ECOLAB)
- Genomics and biotechnology of fruit (GBF)
- Agro-systems and rural development (AGIR)
- Animal production and nutrition (TANDEM)
- Socio-economy of rural territories (DYNAMIQUES RURALES)

== Programs for exchange students ==
ENSAT cooperates with institutions all over the world through student exchanges with other European countries (ERASMUS), Latin America as well as with the U.S. and Canada.

Exchange students can select a list of courses within the following programs:

- ENSAT Agro-engineer's programme (courses in French), in one of the options:
  - Plant Bio sciences – Biotechnology, plant breeding, plant protection
  - Agro-geomatics – Remote sensing, GIS
  - Agro-Management – Project management, Business Administration, Marketing
  - Food Industry – Innovation and product quality
  - Animal Production – Sectors and product quality
  - Environmental Engineering – Water and waste management and treatments
  - Environmental quality and resources management – risk management, management of agricultural impact on environment
  - Agricultural production systems, environment, territories – sustainable development and land use
  - Agro-resources – Green chemistry, bio-fuels, bio-materials, biocosmetics

== Other training ==
- National Diploma in Oenology (courses in French) A two-year programme dedicated to professional training in the sectors of viticulture, wine making and oenology.
- Master “Agrofood Chain” (courses in English) – A multidisciplinary programme to create awareness of scientific, social and economic realities of the modern agrofood industry and to provide scientific and practical training in an international context.
