= European University of Brittany =

- Université Européenne de Bretagne
- Type: Public
- Active: 2007–2015
- Endowment: €14,232,000
- President: Pascal Olivard
- Faculty: 3,600
- Students: 70,000
- Undergraduates: 46,000
- Postgraduates: 22,000
- Doctoral students: 2,700
- Location: Rennes, France
- Website: www.ueb.eu

The European University of Brittany (French: Université européenne de Bretagne), located in Rennes, France, was a center for higher education, academic research and doctoral studies located over multiple campuses in the Academie de Rennes. It includes a doctoral college that federates university institutes, engineering schools and research centres.

Its activities primarily focused on research through the establishment of thematic research networks, project teams, and the recruitment of international researchers. The valorisation of research was operationally handled by its component "Bretagne Valorisation". Research training, or doctoral training, was coordinated by the UEB's international doctoral college, which brought together the region's eight doctoral schools.

The European University of Brittany merged with the Université Nantes Angers Le Mans to form Université Bretagne-Loire in January 2016.

== History ==
=== Previous structures ===
Several cooperation structures were created before the establishment of the European University of Brittany. Some of their activities were taken over by the UEB upon its creation or served as a basis for its setup.

Several institutions located in Rennes had been grouped since October 31, 2001 within the public interest grouping "Europôle". This structure was shared by the city's two universities, INSA Rennes, and ENSAR, and other schools such as IEP Rennes, ESC Rennes, and the ENS Ker Lann were permanently associated with its work. Europôle focused its activities on international exchanges. It was replaced by the Rennes International Mobility Center, one of the UEB's components, starting January 2009.

At the regional level, with local authorities, and following a proposal made in 1999 as part of preparing the state-region plan contract 2000–2006, the universities set up the "University of Brittany" association at the end of 2001. It brought together the presidents of the region's four universities, the director of the Brittany IUFM, and the president of the conference of directors of Brittany's grandes écoles. It handled training issues (continuing education, VAE, Doctoriales), the digital campus, and international relations networks. It was dissolved on August 27, 2009, with most of the association's missions transferred to the UEB. This association was complemented by another at a broader scale with the "Network of Universities of the Atlantic West" (RUOA), which grouped universities from the Brittany, Pays de la Loire, and Poitou-Charentes regions, established in early 2001.

Institutions also grouped around specific projects, such as Génopole Ouest, which associates research organizations (CNRS, Ifremer, Inserm...), the five western universities, university hospitals, and grandes écoles, the Maison des Sciences de l'Homme in Brittany, which associates the four Breton universities and several associate members, or the Jean Monnet Center of Excellence, which associates for research in law, economics, geography, planning, and history on European issues the universities of Rennes 1 and Rennes 2.

=== Formation of the UEB ===
Following the general states of research in 2004, the establishment of structures to organize research was proposed in the form of pôle de recherche et d'enseignement supérieur. Initially, a PRES project centered around the city of Rennes was planned in 2005. However, the agglomeration's schools, keen to preserve their identities, and the universities of Brittany South and Brittany West, keen not to lose international visibility, expanded the project to the Brittany regional framework. The future founding members of the European University of Brittany, continuing the multiple collaborations already undertaken among them, set up a working group in 2006. The project began to take shape following a circular from the Ministry of Higher Education and Research dated 10 July 2006, inviting higher education institution leaders and research organizations to submit PRES project dossiers to the ministry. After several months of work, the nine founding members determined the scope of action for the new entity.

The constitutive grouping of the PRES was created on 1 September 2006, then on 24 November 2006, it voted for the creation of a public scientific cooperation establishment. The research programming law promulgated on 18 April 2006 set the initial guidelines, and in 26 June the government announced the first nine pôles de recherche et d'enseignement supérieur, including the UEB. Its creation became effective by a decree on 22 March 2007. The UEB then began to structure itself with the election on 9 May 2007 of its first president, Bertrand Fortin, then president of University of Rennes 1, unanimously by the board of directors. On 9 July 2007, the UEB board installed its administrators, elected its vice-presidents, and voted its first budget. On 7 February 2008, the grouping adopted a logo.

=== Development ===
==== Campus plan ====
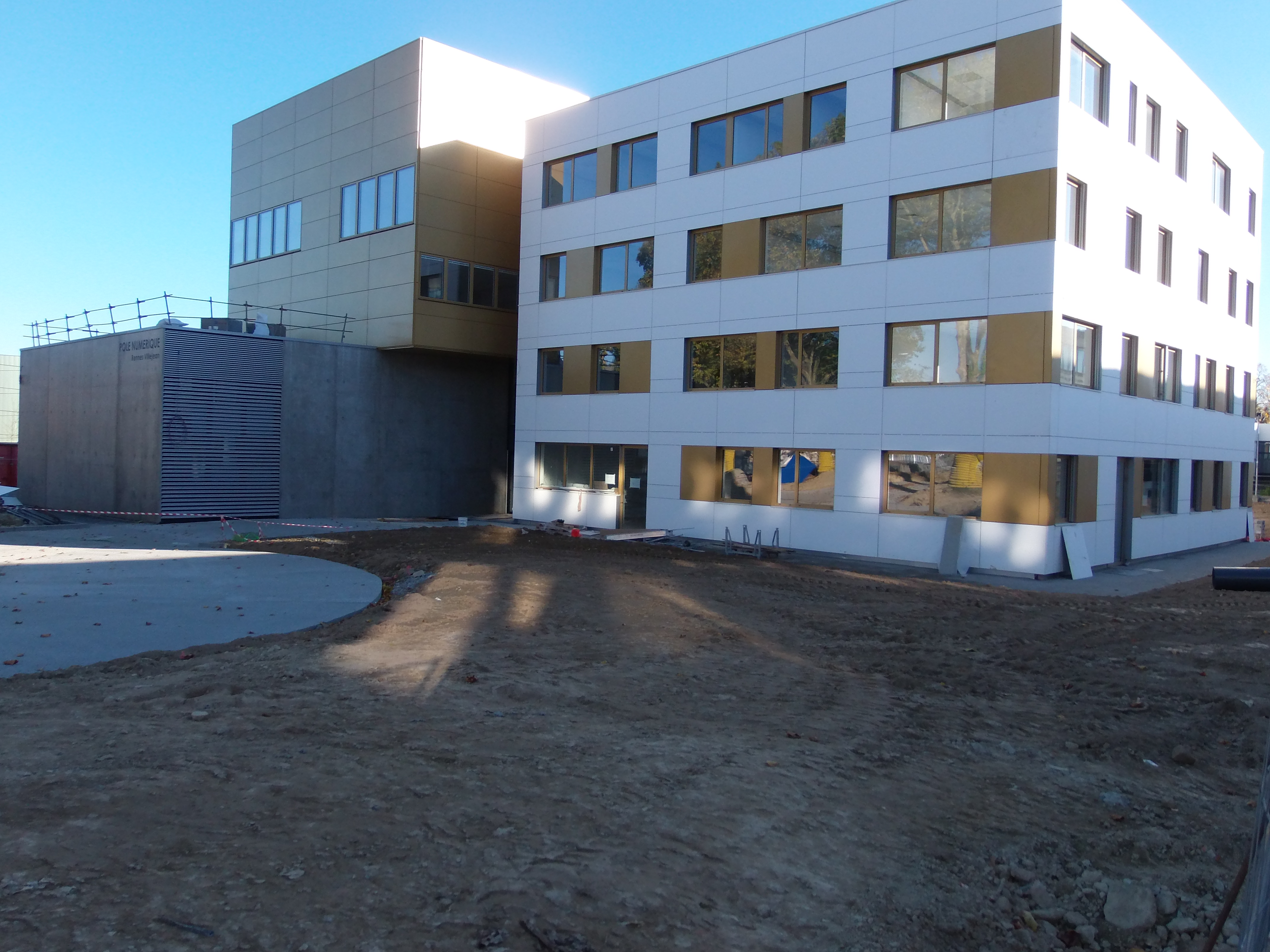
The UEB obtained funding under the Campus plan for creating a digital campus (here on the Villejean campus).

The university applied in early 2008 for funding from the Campus plan, aimed at renovating French university real estate. The project was not selected in late May 2008 among the 12 winners for "excellence campus" endowments, but applied for funding under "promising campus" for its digital campus project. Funding was granted by the state at 30 million euros, supplemented in May 2009 by equivalent funding from local authorities, then in July 2009 an additional 942,000 euros under the economic stimulus plan.

==== Grand Emprunt ====
===== Project maturation =====
A response to the Grand Emprunt calls for proposals was built with the PRES University of Nantes Angers Le Mans starting in 2009. In October of that year, during a colloquium between leaders from Nantes and Rennes, higher education was designated as one of five cooperation areas between the cities. On 1 March 2010, the presidents of the seven universities and two grandes écoles conferences from the two regions set up a coordination committee for Grand Emprunt calls. Tensions emerged, however, with grandes écoles and research organizations tempted to work through their own networks, balance between regions problematic, and the Nantes–Rennes axis temporarily favored over Pays de la Loire–Brittany.

The group represented the second group by annual PhDs awarded, the seventh one by members of the Institut Universitaire de France, the eighth one by researchers in "A" or "A+" labs by AERES, and fourteenth one by European Research Council funding and CNRS Gold Medal holders, overall the ninth one using these criteria.

===== Project results =====
The Initiative d'excellence project was supported in Paris on 16 February 2011 by western elected officials but not retained in the first pre-selection of 7 projects. Project leaders reworked it for the second wave. Several regional higher education actors considered merging the two PRES, and the project was marginal to models promoted, networking favored over mergers/concentrations. Ultimately not retained, but leaders affirmed continuing western France research networking.

A technology transfer acceleration company project was carried by both PRES based on UEB's "Bretagne valorisation", leader in the field. Funding obtained in 26 June. This 70 million euro endowment added to "Bretagne Valorisation"'s annual 2 million euro budget, becoming a simplified joint-stock company.

The results of the Equipex and Labex applications have yielded 34 projects for the region, with total funding of €423 million, including €120.05 million for projects involving only institutions in the region. The winning projects are concentrated in the fields of marine science and technology and information and communication science and technology, but also in the field of biotechnology and bioresources. Applications to establish a technological research institute were finalized in January 2012, with the government releasing €250 million over ten years for the IRT "B.com" focused on imaging and networks as well as e-medicine.

=== Expansion ===
The group expanded on January 1, 2013, with the addition of ECAM Rennes, the European School of Art in Brittany, the School of Environmental Professions, and ESC Rennes as associate members.

=== List of presidents ===
Three presidents succeeded at the UEB's head. The current PRES president is Pascal Olivard, who after a one-year mandate completing predecessor Guy Cathelineau's resigned term, was reelected for a full term in 26 June.

• Bertrand Fortin	2007–2010
• Guy Cathelineau	2010-2012
• Pascal Olivard	Since 2012

== Operation ==
=== Budget ===
The European University of Brittany and University of Bordeaux are the two PRES with budgets over 14,000,000 euros (excluding Campus plan), 2010 budget 14,232,000 euros.

2010 budget revenues
Funding	amount in euros
Ministry subsidies	2,240,000
Regional subsidies	5,490,000
Ille-et-Vilaine department subsidy	69,000
Rennes Métropole agglomeration subsidy	69,000
European subsidies	4,580,000
Member institution payments	1,226,000
VMP sales	80,000

Main 2010 expenditure items
Expenditure item	amount in euros
Regional very high-speed network	6,184,368
Digital (UEB campus, services, content)	4,780,000
Management-communication	445,000
International chairs	480,000
International Doctoral College	333,000

== Objectives and achievements ==
=== Doctoral training ===
The university acts in doctoral training at several levels. It coordinates the eight Breton doctoral schools and created the "International Doctoral College of the European University of Brittany" federating them. Doctorates from member institutions bear the PRES and supervising institution seal. It monitors PhD insertion and some doctoral trainings.

It handles international mobility for French/foreign PhDs. Publishes "PhD Guide in Brittany" in French/English, manages incoming/outgoing mobility grants. Between the creation of the UEB and 2010, 103 grants were awarded, including 78 outgoing and 25 incoming.

=== Research activities ===
UEB members have over 3,500 researchers and nearly 3,000 PhDs in six thematic fields. The humanities and social sciences research cluster accounts for 33% of the research workforce, followed by mathematics and information and communication sciences and technologies with 24%, materials science and engineering with 13%, and bio-health with 12%. Finally, the marine cluster accounts for 8% of the research workforce. Scientific articles published by member institution laboratories are published under the dual seal of the member institution and the UEB.

UEB supports research platforms, mapping, structuring tools (themes, international chairs). Exclusive valorization via "Bretagne valorisation". International researcher chairs; five recruited in 2010, up to 50 over next four years.

=== Infrastructure ===
The creation of a digital campus, shared by the various members, began in 2009, with the installation of the first four teleconferencing facilities delivered in mid-2010. Others followed, two in Brest and two in Rennes.

The university's real estate development began in the fall of 2009 with the announcement of the construction of a headquarters for the institution in downtown Rennes.

=== Media ===
Through its members' activities, the UEB has created some 2,000 hours of online teaching content and 112 study points across Great Britain, and has ensured that the institutions' digital resources are indexed. Some are available via iTunes from 31 May 2011.

The institution also has its own media. A wiki radio station was launched on November 29, 2010, allowing member institutions to take turns broadcasting their content. A magazine was launched in June 2011, "U Mag," shared by the Nantes Angers Le Mans University Press.

== Members ==
- University of Western Brittany
- University of Southern Brittany
- University of Rennes 1
- University of Rennes 2 – Upper Brittany
- AGROCAMPUS OUEST
- École Normale Supérieure de Cachan's Ker Lann campus
- École nationale supérieure de chimie de Rennes
- INSA Rennes
- TELECOM Bretagne
- European Academy of Art in Brittany (EESAB)
- ECAM Rennes
- EME Rennes
- ESC Rennes School of Business

== See also ==
- Pôle de recherche et d'enseignement supérieur
- Higher education in France
