= Toulouse University System =

Cluster of universities and higher education insitutions

Coordinates: 43.6044°N 1.4439°E

Communauté d'universités et établissements de Toulouse
- President: Philippe Raimbault
- Students: 110,000 (in 2023)
- Location: Toulouse, Occitanie, France
- Website: https://www.univ-toulouse.fr/

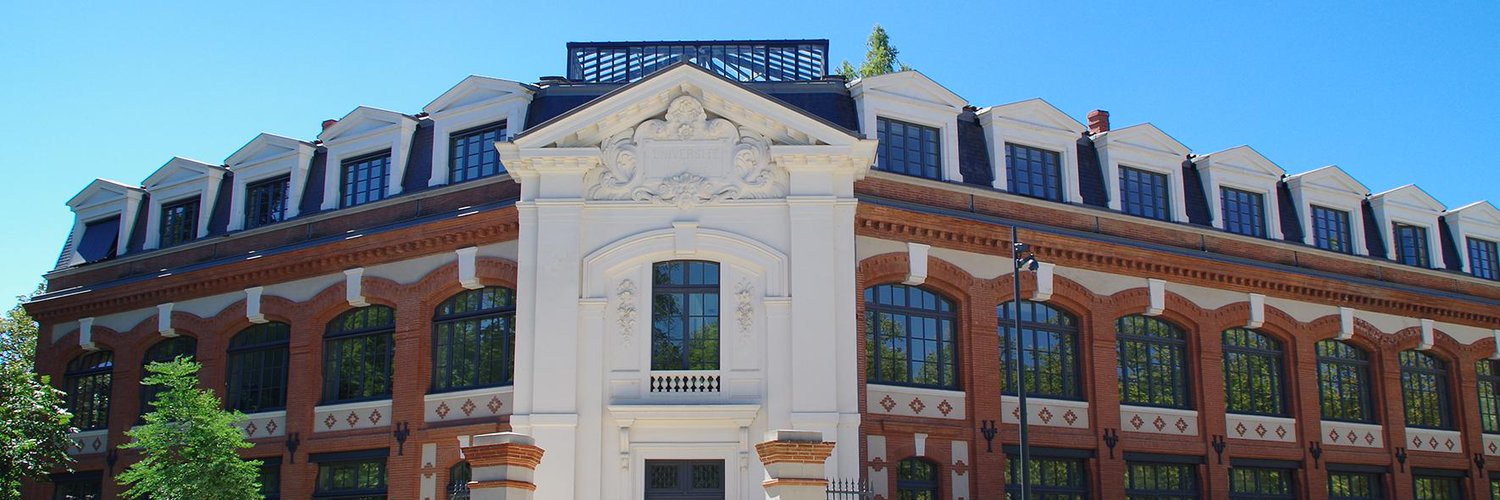
Universite-de-Toulouse

The Communauté d'universités et établissements de Toulouse, or the Toulouse University System, formerly the Federal University of Toulouse Midi-Pyrénées, is the association of universities and higher education institutions (ComUE) for institutions of higher education and research in the French region of Midi-Pyrénées (now called Occitania).

The three universities, along with other institutions, participated in the reconstruction of the University of Toulouse – a joint structure of 107,000 students including 4,500 doctoral students, 17,000 staffs and 145 research laboratories. The mission was entrusted to Patrick Lévy, former president of the Grenoble Alpes University, accompanied by Philippe Raimbault, president of the Federal University of Toulouse Midi-Pyrénées.

== History ==
Former logo (2013-2023)

The university system was created as a ComUE according to the 2013 Law on Higher Education and Research (France), effective 1 July 2015. It replaced the pôle de recherche et d'enseignement supérieur (PRES) which had been organized in 2007 to coordinate higher education and research in the region.

In 2021, Patrick Lévy conducted an audit of the university site, which proposed changes. In 2022, this process led to the evolution of the institution towards the status of an experimental ComUE. On 1 January 2023 the Université fédérale Toulouse Midi-Pyrénées became the Université de Toulouse.

== Members ==
University rankings

Global – Overall
- THE World: 401–500 (2020)
- USNWR Global: 175 (2020)

The university system brought together the following institutions:

- Toulouse III - Paul Sabatier University
- Toulouse Capitole University
- University of Toulouse-Jean Jaurès
- National Polytechnic Institute of Toulouse (Toulouse INP), consists of 7 schools
- Institut national des sciences appliquées de Toulouse (INSA Toulouse)
- Institut supérieur de l'aéronautique et de l'espace (ISAE-SUPAERO)
- Institut d'études politiques de Toulouse (Sciences Po Toulouse)
- National University Institute Jean-Francois Champollion (INUC)
- École des Mines d'Albi-Carmaux (IMT Mines Albi)
- École nationale de l'aviation civile (ENAC)
- École nationale supérieure d'architecture de Toulouse (ENSA Toulouse)
- École nationale supérieure de formation de l’enseignement agricole (ENSFEA)
- Toulouse Business School (TBS)
- Institut Catholique d'Arts et Métiers (ICAM)

== Doctoral schools ==
The Doctoral Schools are all members of the Research and Doctoral Department of the university system : 15 Doctoral Schools representing a research potential of 4200 Scientists including 2400 Senior Scientists; 4200 PhD students and 800 Doctorate diplomas awarded per year.

=== In the field of Science and Technology ===
- Biology, Health & Biotechnologies
- Sciences for Ecology, Veterinary, Agronomy & Bioengineery
- Geosciences, Astrophysics & Space Sciences
- Mathematics, Informatics & Telecommunications Toulouse Doctoral School
- Electrical, Electronic Engineering & Telecommunications
- Systems
- Physics, Chemistry & Materials Sciences
- Mechanics, Energetics, Civil & Process Engineering
- Aeronautics & Astronautics

=== In the field of Social Sciences and Humanities ===
- Behavior, Language, Education, Socialisation, Cognition
- Art, Literatures, Languages, Philosophy, Information & Communication
- Time, Spaces, Societies & Cultures
- Legal & Political Sciences
- Management Sciences
- Toulouse School of Economics
