= ENM =

ENM may refer to:

== Education ==
- École nationale de la météorologie, a French engineering college
- École nationale de la magistrature, a French law college
- Escuela Naval Militar, a Spanish naval academy

== Other uses ==
- Emmonak Airport (FAA LID:ENM), Alaska, United States
- Middle English, the English language spoken in the Middles Ages (ISO 639:enm)
- Environmental niche modelling, in ecology
- United National Movement (Georgia), a political party (Georgian: Ertiani Natsionaluri Modzraoba)
- Ethical non-monogamy, in relationships
