= Icam Strasbourg-Europe =

Engineering school in Schiltigheim, France

Coordinates: 48.6091°N 7.7053°E

- Icam, site de Strasbourg-Europe
- Type: Private non-profit engineering school
- Established: 2009
- Parent institution: Institut catholique d'arts et métiers
- Location: Schiltigheim, France
- Website: www.icam.fr/les-campus-icam/le-campus-de-strasbourg-europe/

Icam Strasbourg-Europe, formerly ECAM Strasbourg-Europe, is an engineering school in Schiltigheim, near Strasbourg, France. It was created in 2009 as the École catholique des arts et métiers Strasbourg-Europe, a member of the ECAM group, and has been a campus of the Institut catholique d'arts et métiers (Icam) since 2022.

== History ==
The school was created as an association under the civil law applicable in Alsace-Moselle by a notarial deed of 30 June 2009, and joined the ECAM group, whose three other engineering schools were in Lyon, Rennes and Cergy-Pontoise. The building in Schiltigheim was completed in September 2012, and the first engineering graduates, a class of 23 students, received their degrees in 2014.

In June 2022 the Icam announced that ECAM Strasbourg-Europe was joining its group. The boards of Icam and of ECAM Strasbourg-Europe approved the move on 16 and 20 June 2022, and the statutes of the new association were filed in August 2022. The school was renamed Icam, Strasbourg-Europe campus and became the seventh Icam campus in France. Students who entered up to September 2022 were to receive an ECAM diploma, while those joining from September 2023 would work toward an Icam diploma.

== Academic programs ==
This school was accredited on 6 July 2010 by the Commission des titres d'ingénieurs (CTI) to confer the degree of "Engineer graduated from ECAM Strasbourg-Europe," with accreditation renewed in September 2016. The first ECAM Strasbourg-Europe engineers graduated on November 15, 2014, in a ceremony attended by the class patron Jean-Louis Debré.

Icam, Strasbourg-Europe campus is affiliated with the preparatory classes of Collège Saint-Étienne and Lycée Jean XXIII in Montigny-lès-Metz. The school trains cohorts of 120 engineers (data from 2018-2019). In 2022, the school hosted 550 students.

The building has a wooden frame. It was designed by architect Pierre Valantin from the ARXarchitecture firm.

== Building ==
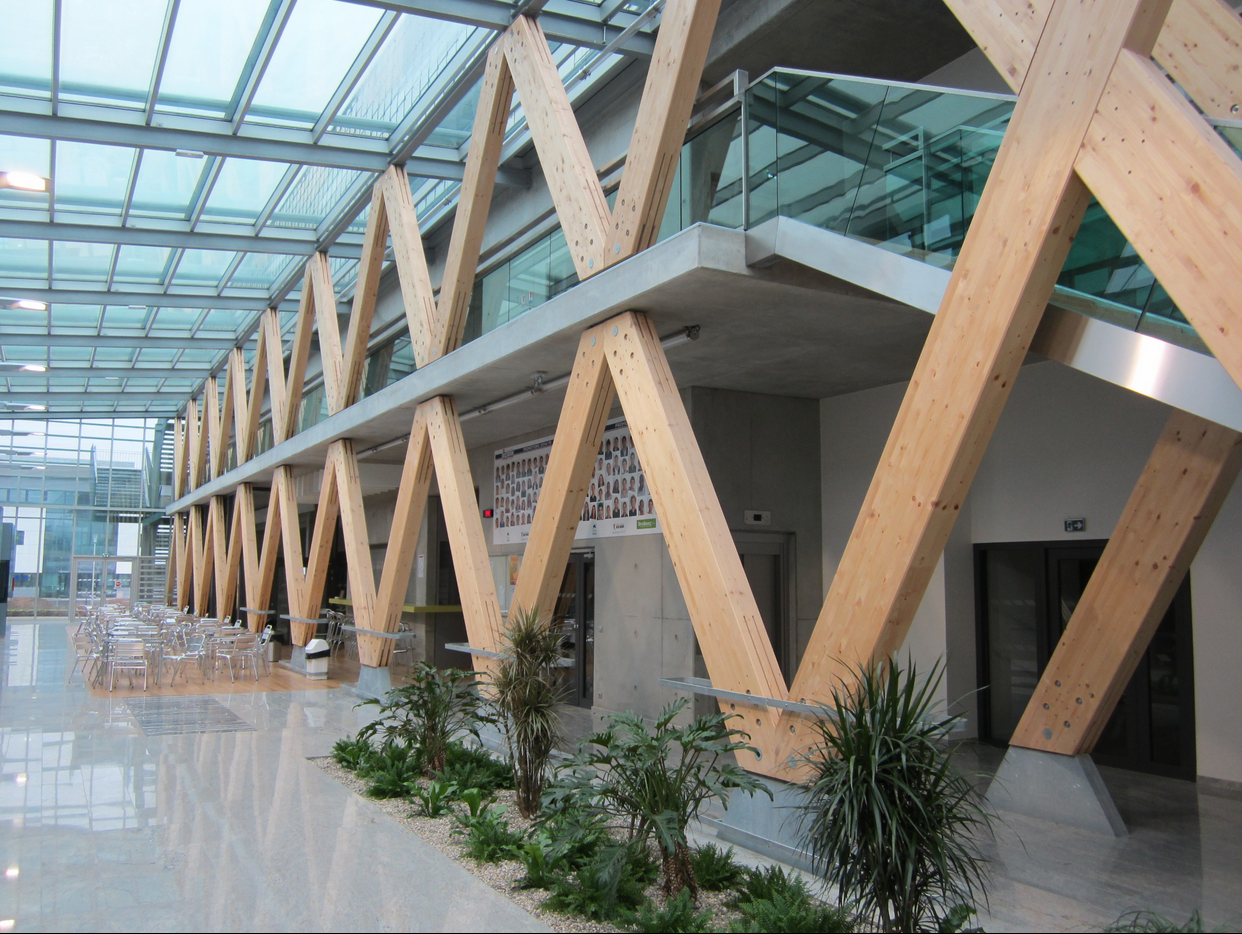
Interior architecture of Icam Strasbourg-Europe featuring a wooden structure.

A low-energy building (48.5 kWh/m^{2} (16.2 MJ/sq ft)), it has received the national label "Demonstration Building" from Pôle Alsace Énergivie.

== See also ==
- Institut catholique d'arts et métiers
