= John Persenda =

French businessman

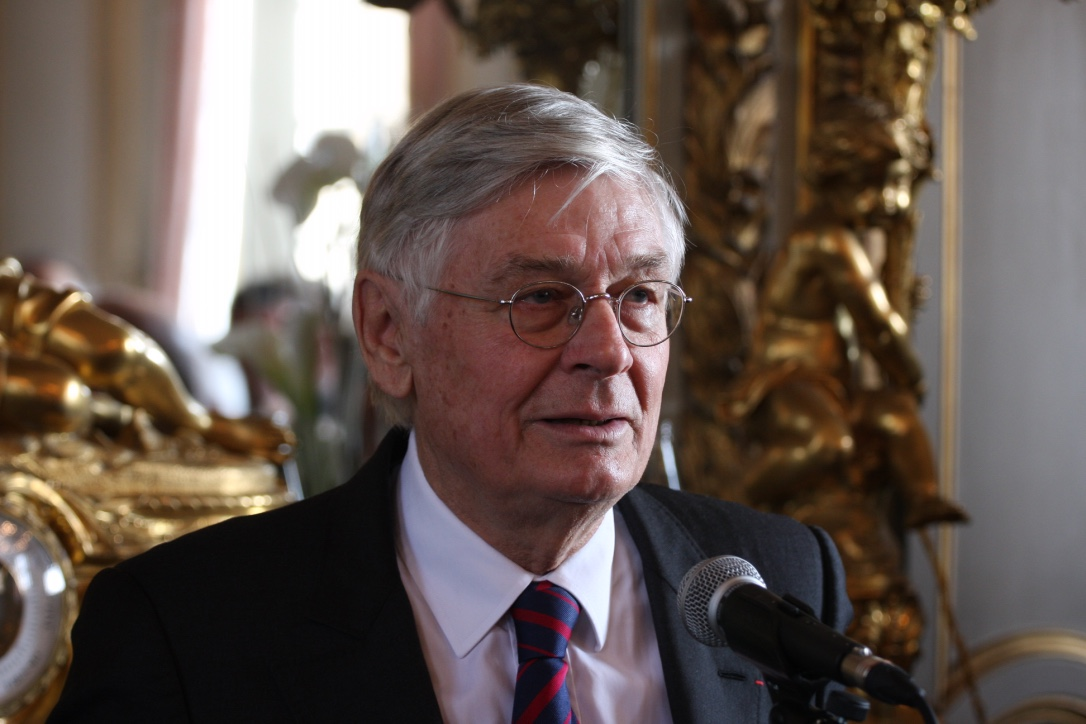
- Born: 28 May 1939 (age 87); Monaco
- Education: École nationale supérieure de chimie de Toulouse (ENSCT)
- Occupation: CEO of SPHERE Group

John Persenda (born 28 May 1939) is a French businessman and founder of the Sphere Group, which is the European leader in household packaging and one of the world's leading producers of bio-sourced and compostable materials. He began his career as a research engineer at the CEA before joining Shell. In 2006, he was appointed a Knight of the Legion of Honour.

== Personal life ==
John Persenda was born in Monaco on 28 May 1939. His father was an Italian diplomat and a pilot, and his mother was an English writer.

He was granted French nationality at the age of 10. He had two children – Isabelle, who was born in 1966, and Philippe, who was born in 1970 and died in 2006.

== Education and career ==
After graduating with his baccalaureate in 1958, Persenda attended the ENSI preparatory classes at the Lycée Massena in Nice.

He started studying at the École Nationale Supérieure des Ingénieurs en Arts Chimiques et Technologiques (ENSCT) in October 1960 and obtained an engineering degree, alongside a degree in physics and chemistry in 1963. He is also a reserve officer of the Cavalry School in Saumur.

Persenda began his career as a research engineer at the French Alternative Energies and Atomic Energy Commission (CEA), where he worked on the atomic bomb detonator.

In 1965, he joined the Shell group as a sales engineer, a technical division manager and then a marketing manager. He worked in France and London.

== Establishment of the SPHERE Group ==
In 1976, Persenda founded SP Metal. The company originally specialised in the distribution of household packaging.

Shortly after that, he founded private labels in France for household packaging and created the national brand Alfapac.

In 1982, Persenda began the group's European expansion by pursuing a policy of external growth and relocating production facilities back to France.

In 2003, he was appointed the chairman of the plastics industry network and the president of the Plastic Films Union.

In 2004, he became the president of Plasteurofilm and got engaged in the anti-dumping fight against Asian competitors, as well as in the harmonisation of environmental laws. Persenda was one of the first to launch bags made from sugar cane rather than oil.

He also supported the 2004 amendment by deputies Francis Delattre and Marc Le Fur. The amendment foresaw banning the distribution of non-compostable plastic bags from 1 January 2010, which were ultimately banned only with the energy transition law for green growth in 2017.

Following the example of Arnaud Montebourg, Persenda demonstrated a strong commitment to the "made in France" campaign, after obtaining Origine France Garantie label for his group's French sites.

In 2017, he signed the French Climate Business Pledge of the MEDEF, which aims to make a collective and significant change in the fight against climate change.

In June 2017, he participated in the G7 Environment in Bologna, where he made a speech about "how firms may promote greater environmental responsibility".

In 2015, during the event S3Odeon in Paris, Persenda announced the development of a new material that can biodegrade in marine environments.

== Fortune ==
According to Challenge magazine, Persenda is one of the 500 richest persons in France.

== Awards ==
In 2006, Persenda was appointed Knight of the Legion of Honour by President Jacques Chirac.

- 2013: Chaptal Prize for Industry
- 2014: the BFM Awards for Entrepreneur of the Year
- 2015: LCI Green Business Entrepreneurial Ambitions Award
- 2016: Entrepreneurs' Ambitions Banque Palatine - I TV "Green Business" Category Trophy
- 2020: Plasturgist Trophy - "Growth" category

== Bibliography ==
- Michel Saloff Coste, Carine Dartiguepeyrou et Wilfrid Raffard (2006). Le dirigeant du 3e millénaire (in French). édition d'Organisation. p. 310. ISBN 2708134787.
- Yvon Gattaz (2014). Création d'entreprise : la double révolution (in French). éditions Eyrolles. p. 224. ISBN 978-2212558746.
- Entre gestion de l'eau et débouchés non alimentaires: les nouveaux visages de l'agriculture (in French). Altedia M&M Conseil. 2006. ISBN 978-2-84541-118-0.
- Le Who's Who France, édition 2020 (in French). Lafitte-Hebrard. 2019.
