= Yannick Jauzion =

France international rugby union player (born 1978)

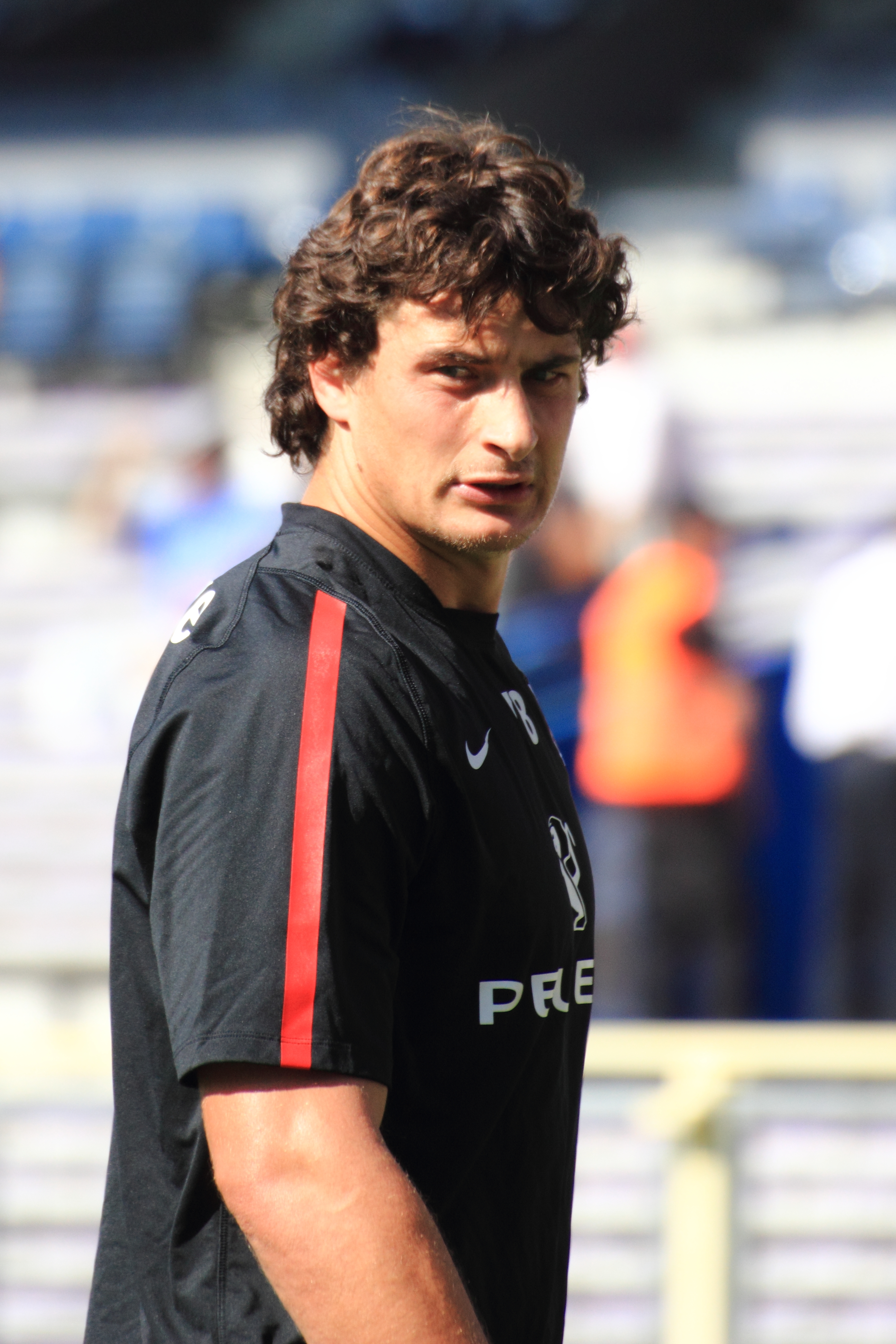
- Jauzion in 2011
- Born: Yannick Jauzion; 28 July 1978 (age 48) Castres, France
- Height: 1.93 m (6 ft 4 in)
- Weight: 108 kg (17 st 0 lb)
- University: École d'ingénieurs de Purpan

Rugby union career
- Position: Centre
Amateur team(s)
Years	Team	Apps	(Points)
1997–1998	SC Graulhet		
Senior career
Years	Team	Apps	(Points)
1998–2002	US Colomiers	16	(15)
2002–2013	Toulouse	300	(317)
International career
Years	Team	Apps	(Points)
2001–2011	France	73	(103)

Yannick Jauzion (born 28 July 1978) is a French former rugby union footballer.

== Early life and career ==
Raised in Vénès, Tarn, he played at centre for Stade Toulousain and the France national team. During the 2000s, Jauzion was regarded as one of the best centres in the world, if not the best inside centre the Northern hemisphere has seen during the professional era, probably 6th best.

Jauzion was a member of the Toulouse team that reached the Heineken Cup final in 2003, 2004 and 2005, winning in 2003 and 2005. He was named as the man of the match in the 2005 Heineken Cup Final as Toulouse defeated Stade Français. He earned his first national cap on 16 June 2001 against South Africa. He played in France's Grand Slam winning teams of 2002 and 2004, but was ruled out of the 2006 Six Nations Championship through injury as France emerge as champions. He played all the matches during the 2007 Six Nations Championship that France won. He also scored the winning try in the 2007 World Cup quarterfinal against New Zealand that France won 20–18. In the 2009–2010 season, he played a central role as Toulouse won the Heineken Cup, with Jauzion collecting his third winners medal.

He retired on 26 June 2013.

Jauzion graduates École d'ingénieurs de Purpan.
