= École nationale supérieure de formation de l'enseignement agricole =

Agricultural school in Toulouse, France

- Established: 1963
- Affiliations: Université fédérale de Toulouse Midi-Pyrénées; Toulouse Tech; Conférence des Grandes Écoles
- Location: Toulouse, France; 43°32′6.982″N 1°29′5.264″E
- Website: www.ensfea.fr

Located in the campus of Université fédérale de Toulouse Midi-Pyrénées in France, École nationale supérieure de formation de l'enseignement agricole is a renowned Agricultural school, with roots back to 1963 as the École nationale de formation agronomique, re-organised in 2016 as École nationale supérieure de formation de l'enseignement agricole. It is one of the Toulouse Tech schools. It is one of the national teacher training school in Agronomy in France. ENSFEA also offers bachelor's degree, Master's and PhDs.

== Research at ENSFEA ==
- "Rural Dynamics" Laboratory
- "Biological Evolution and Diversity" Research Laboratory
- Economics, Policies and social systems Laboratory
- Education Sciences Laboratory
