= Laurent Rossi =

French engineer (born 1975)

- Born: 2 November 1975 (age 49); Corsica, France
- Occupation: Engineer
- Employer: Alpine
- Known for: Engineer and Business executive
- Title: CEO

Laurent Rossi (born 2 November 1975) is the former chief executive officer of Automobiles Alpine and the Alpine F1 Team. With the Alpine name joining the Formula 1 grid ahead of the 2021 FIA Formula 1 World Championship season, Laurent Rossi was appointed CEO of Alpine.

== Early life ==
Rossi holds a Master of Science in Fluid Mechanics from ENSEEIHT (Toulouse) and a Master of Science in Mechanical Engineering / Automotive Engines & Petroleum Products from IFP School (Paris).

== Career ==
Rossi began his career in 2000 at Renault, in the powertrain department managing gasoline engines fine tuning and calibration projects such as direct injection engines, supercharged engines and hybrid concepts. In 2009, after obtaining an MBA from Harvard Business School, he was recruited by the Boston Consulting Group, where he worked in the New York office as an automotive expert. In 2012, Rossi joined Google, where he was in charge of developing business relations with key accounts in the automotive industry. He returned to Renault in 2018 as Vice President, Strategic Organisation before becoming Director of Strategy & Business Development for Groupe Renault.

== Alpine ==
After the surprise departure of Cyril Abiteboul, Rossi was appointed CEO of Alpine in January 2021, reporting directly to Luca de Meo CEO of Renault. His first season with Alpine was highlighted by Esteban Ocon’s victory in Hungary and Fernando Alonso’s podium in Qatar, and a fifth position in the constructors’ championship before AlphaTauri.

In July 2023, Rossi was replaced in his role by Philippe Krief.
