= Jean-François Champollion University Center for Teaching and Research =

French university, in the Academy of Toulouse

Coordinates: 43.9182°N 2.1376°E

Jean-François Champollion National University Institute
- Institut National Universitaire Jean-François Champollion
- Type: Public
- Affiliations: Toulouse Tech
- Location: Albi, France
- Website: www.univ-jfc.fr (in French)

The National University Institute Jean-Francois Champollion (French: Institut national universitaire Jean-François Champollion, pronounced [ɛ̃stity nɑsjɔnal ynivɛʁsitɛːʁ ʒɑ̃ fʁɑ̃swa ʃɑ̃pɔljɔ̃]), formerly known as Jean-Francois Champollion University Center for Teaching and Research (Centre universitaire de formation et de recherche Jean-François Champollion) is a French university in the Toulouse Academy. Founded in 2002 on the site of the former military barracks of the Caserne Lapérouse in Albi, site of its main campus and administrative offices, it also has campuses in Rodez and Castres. With fewer than 4000 students it is one of France's smallest universities, a fact which has often been credited with its high rate of student success. In 2014 and again in 2017, it was ranked first among all French universities for first-year students successfully passing on the second year of licence.

It is a member of the Université fédérale de Toulouse Midi-Pyrénées, and maintains particularly close relations with the three major universities in Toulouse that were instrumental in its establishment, the University of Toulouse I – Capitol (Law, Economics and Management), University of Toulouse II – Jean-Jaurès (Arts, Literature, Humanities and Languages), and University of Toulouse III – Paul Sabatier (Science, Technology and Health). It thus has the unique advantage of offering the whole range of disciplines on the same campus, something not normally possible in larger universities in France.

Saint Francis University, Loretto, Pennsylvania conducts some classes there. All Saint Francis classes are taught in English. Saint Francis University also runs a campus at Ambialet, France in the Midi-Pyrénées.

== See also ==
- Universities and colleges in Toulouse
