= École nationale vétérinaire de Toulouse =

Veterinary school in France

Coordinates: 43.59929°N 1.382784°E

National Veterinary School of Toulouse
- École nationale vétérinaire de Toulouse
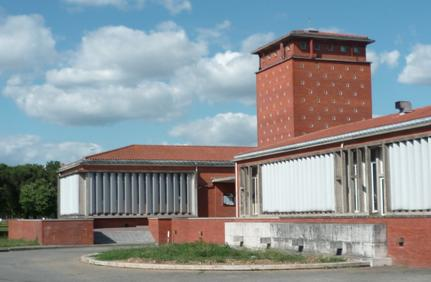
- Library of the National Veterinary School of Toulouse
- Type: Grande école vétérinaire (public research university
- Established: 1825; 201 years ago
- Affiliations: Conférence des Grandes écoles Federal University of Toulouse Midi-Pyrénées; Toulouse III - Paul Sabatier University
- President: Christophe Brard
- Location: Toulouse, France
- Website: envt.fr
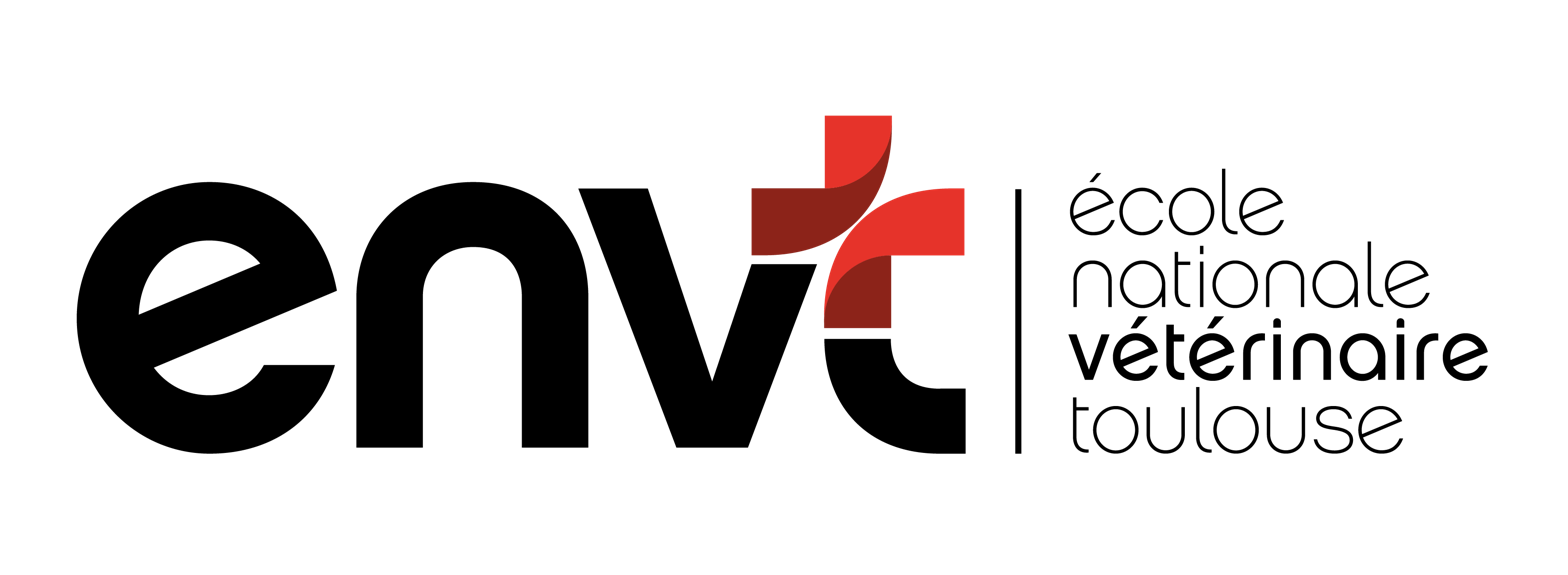

École nationale vétérinaire de Toulouse (French pronunciation: [ekɔl nɑsjɔnal veteʁinɛːʁ də tuluz]; "National Veterinary School of Toulouse") is a veterinary school located in Toulouse, France. Established in 1825, it is also an institution of higher education and research and a teaching hospital.

== Overview ==
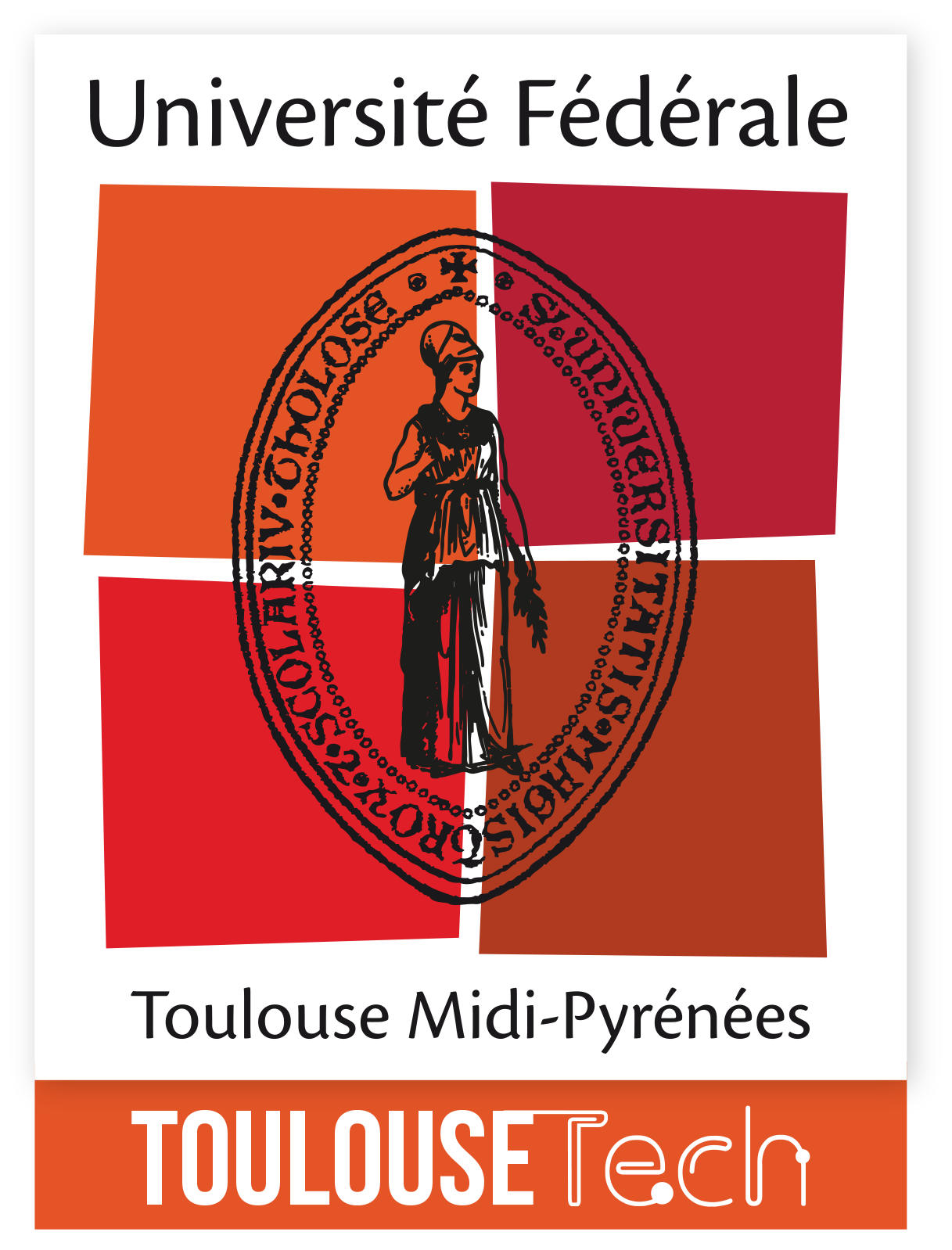

Opened in 1828, the ENVT is the oldest Grande École in Toulouse, and the school has trained more than a quarter of all veterinarians in France – over 15,000 graduates. As a Grande École, ENVT a French institution of higher education that is separate from, but parallel and connected to the main framework of the French public university system. Similar to the Ivy League in the United States, Oxbridge in the UK, and C9 League in China, Grandes Écoles are elite academic institutions that admit students through an extremely competitive process. Grandes Écoles typically they have much smaller class sizes and student bodies than public universities in France, and many of their programs are taught in English. International internships, study abroad opportunities, and close ties with government and the corporate world are a hallmark of the Grandes Écoles. Degrees from ENVT are accredited by the Conférence des Grandes Écoles and awarded by the Ministry of National Education (France) (French: Le Ministère de L'éducation Nationale).

ENVT is also founding member of the Federal University of Toulouse Midi-Pyrénées (French: Université fédérale de Toulouse Midi-Pyrénées), the association of universities and higher education institutions (ComUE), which is reconstituting the collective Université de Toulouse. As a full-fledged member, EMVT coordinates the training offers and the research and transfer strategies of 31 public university and research establishments within the Occitanie region, has its own budgetary allocation, and can issue diplomas. Among others, this membership includes all large campuses in Toulouse: Capitole University, Jean Jaurès, Paul Sabatier University, Sciences Po Toulouse, INSA Toulouse, ISAE-SUPAERO, as well as the 7 grandes écoles of the National Polytechnic Institute of Toulouse. As a collective higher education structure, it is the fourth largest in France with over 130,000 students, faculty, and staff.

== See also ==
- Veterinary education in France
