= École nationale d'ingénieurs de Tarbes =

French school of engineering

École nationale d'ingénieurs de Tarbes (ENIT)
- Motto: Concevons l'avenir
- Motto in English: "Designing the future"
- Type: Grande école Public engineering school
- Established: 1963
- Affiliations: National Polytechnic Institute of Toulouse, University of Toulouse, ENI group, Geipi-Polytech, Toulouse Tech, CGE, CDEFI, "Elles Bougent"
- Director: Jean-Yves Fourquet
- Students: 1,200
- Location: Tarbes, France; 43.224928°N 0.051134°E
- Colors: Red
- Website: www.enit.fr

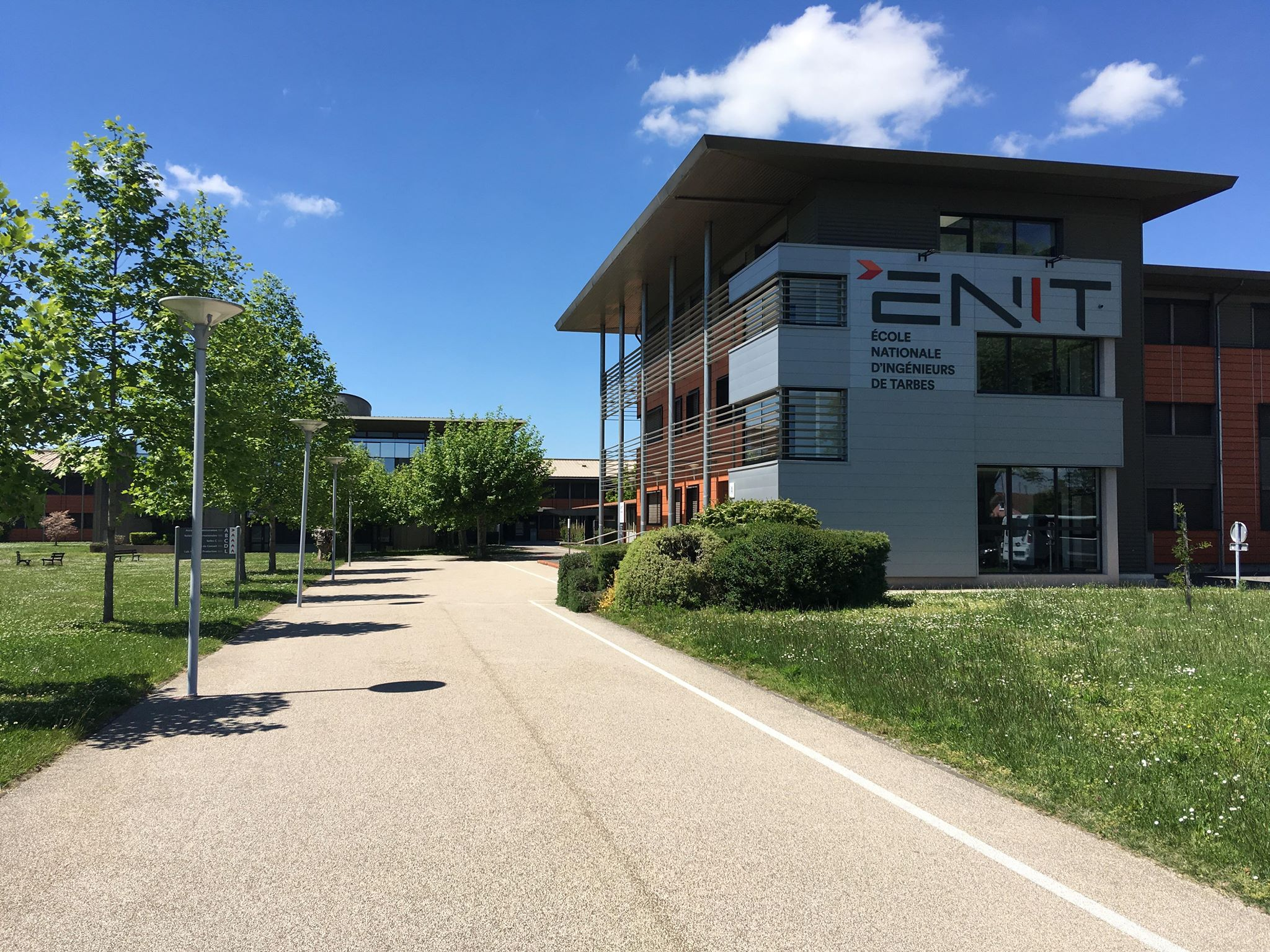
The administration building with the new logo.

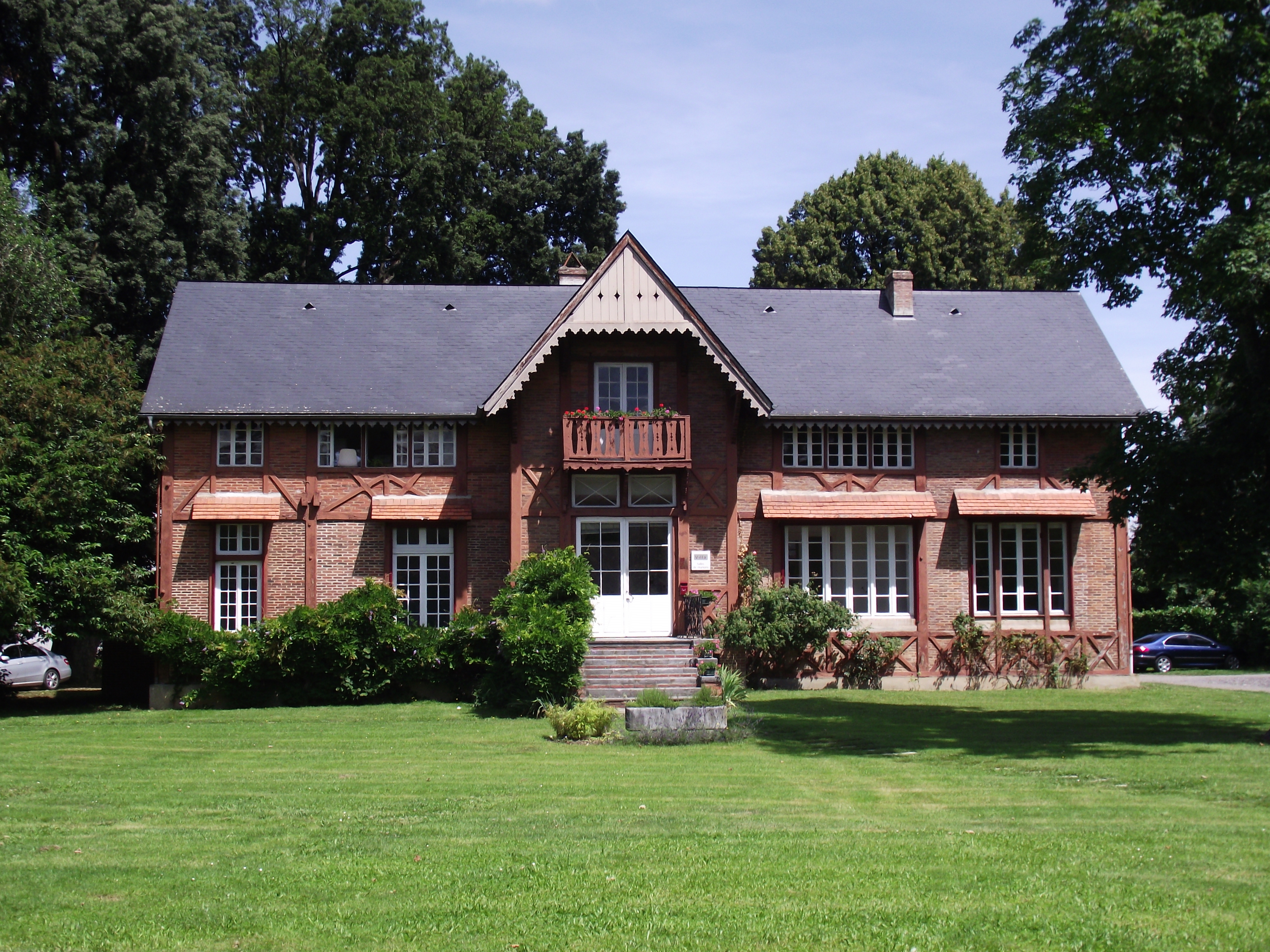
The "Villa".

The École nationale d'Ingénieurs de Tarbes (French pronunciation: [ekɔl nɑsjɔnal dɛ̃ʒenjœʁ də taʁb]; transl. "National School of Engineers of Tarbes"; ENIT) is a French school of engineering leading to the French Diplôme d'Ingénieur under the authority of the French Ministry of Education and Research and part of the National Polytechnic Institute of Toulouse (INPT). Founded in 1963, about 200 students graduate from the ENIT each year.
ENIT is part of the ENI group (national schools of engineers), which is a network of 4 French public engineering schools.

== Location ==
ENIT is located in Tarbes in the département of Hautes-Pyrénées, in the Southwest of France 30 km east of Pau and 150 km south of Toulouse. It is about 1 hour 50 minutes drive away from the beach resort of Biarritz and 45 minutes drive away from the main ski resort of the Pyrénées mountain.

In Tarbes, ENIT is located in the southwest, in the Tarbes-Pyrenees university center that includes several schools, laboratories, university residence and a cafeteria. The school and campus are served by T2 bus line at University stop and by T3 bus line at ENI stop. The lines also connect the city center (Verdun place) and the railway station.

ENIT is composed of course buildings, a library, a laboratory with a machining workshop, a gym and a garden.

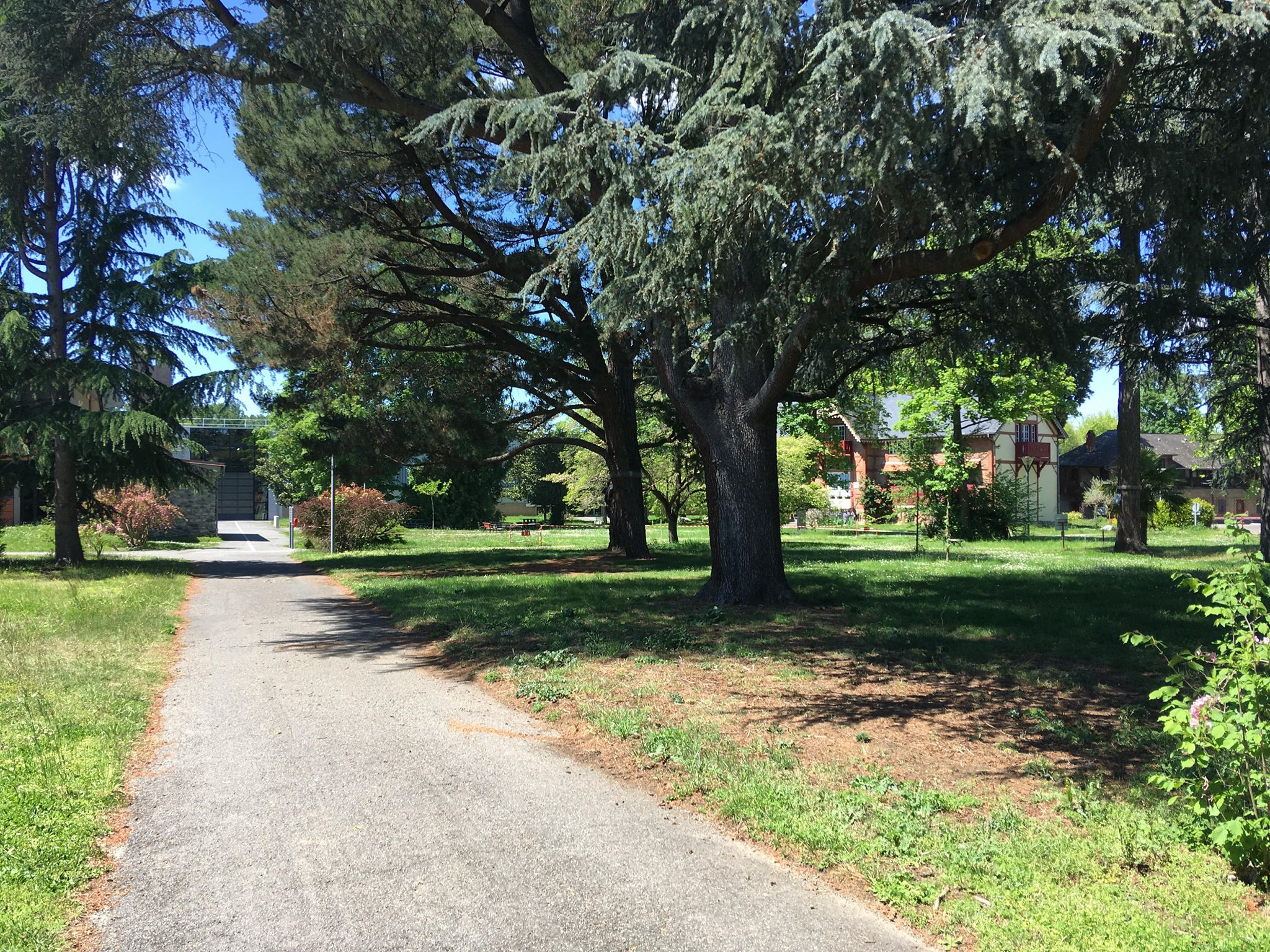
Garden.

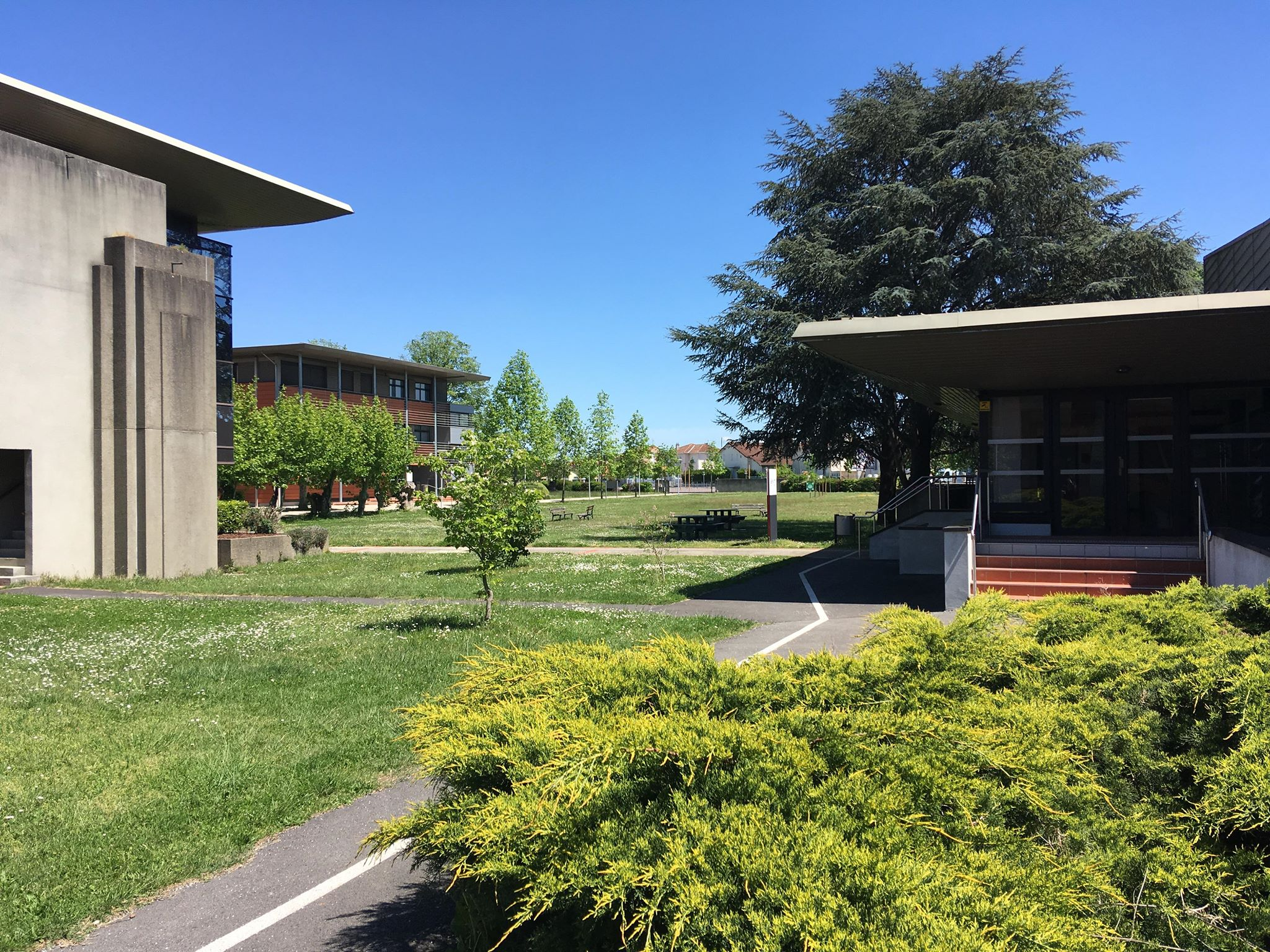
Garden.

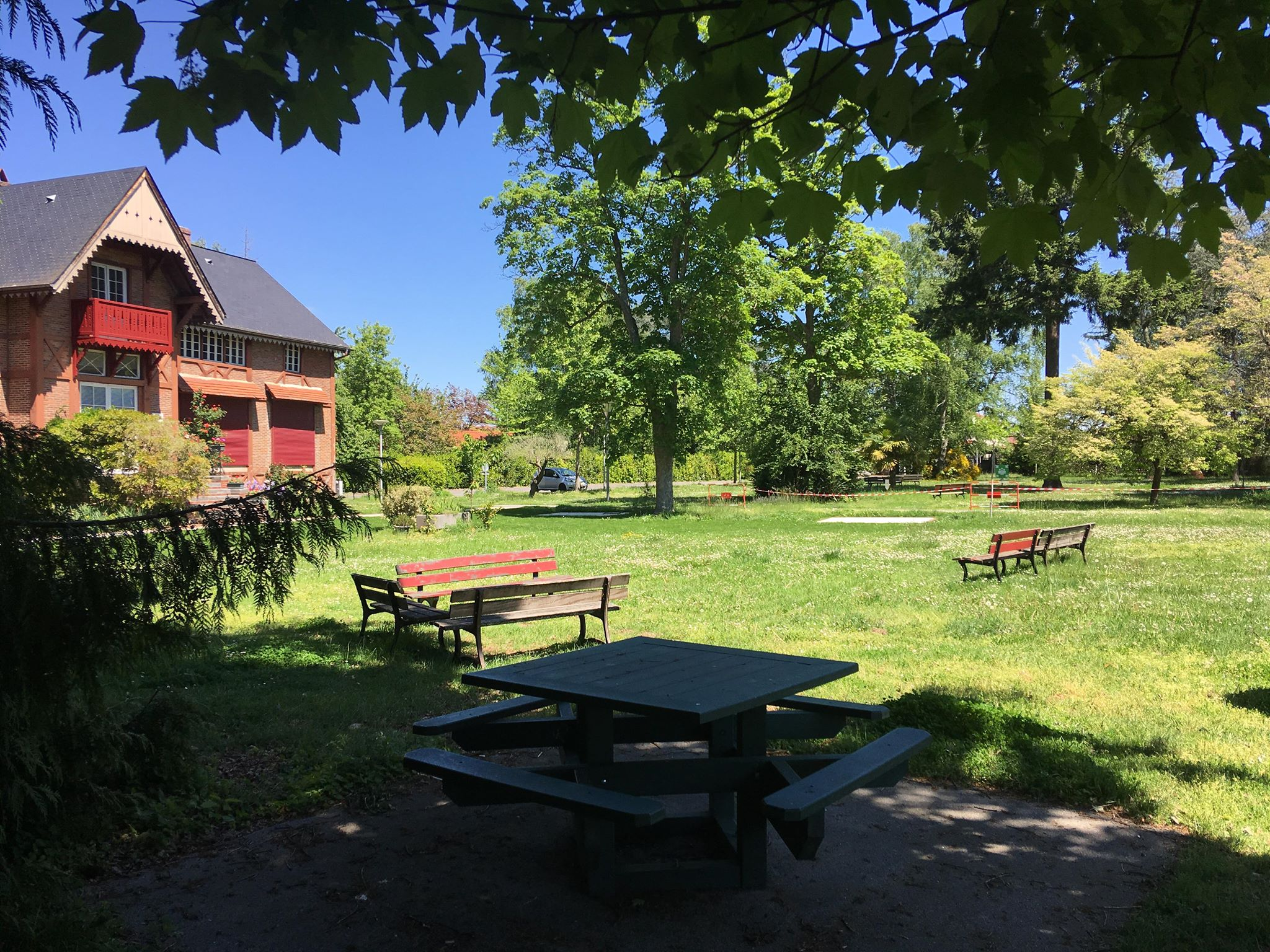
Garden with the “Villa”.

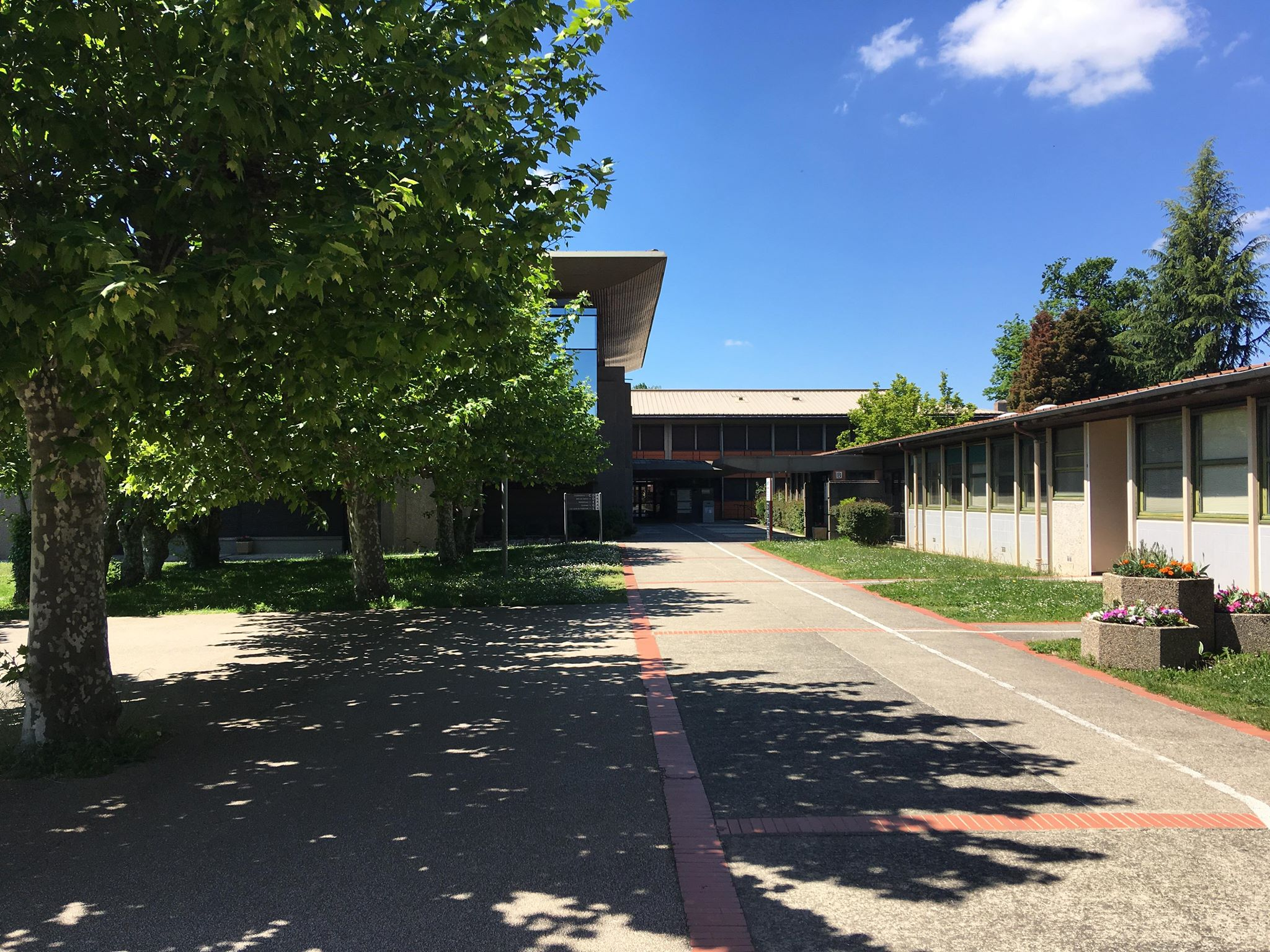
Driveways.

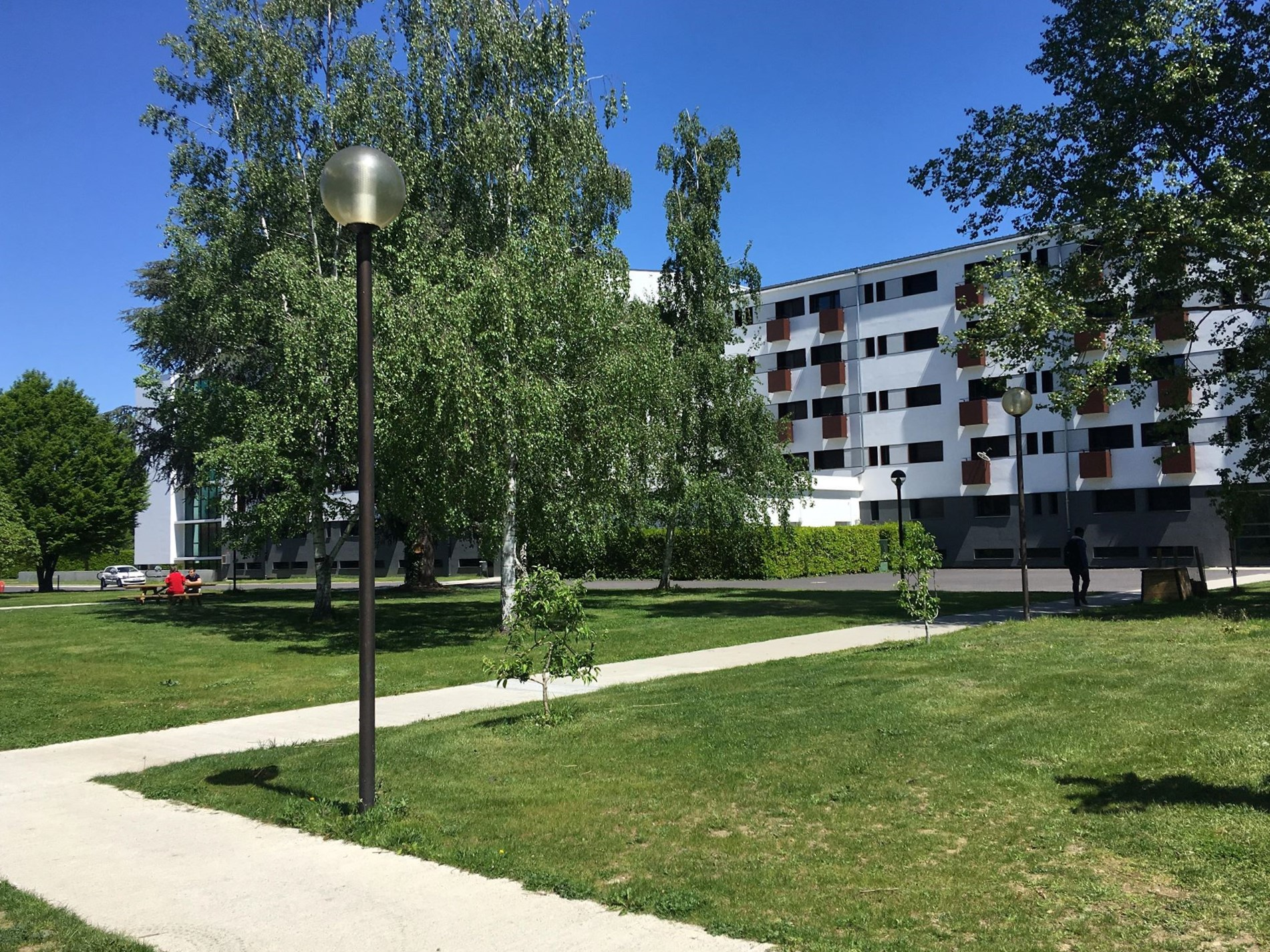
Tarbes university campus.

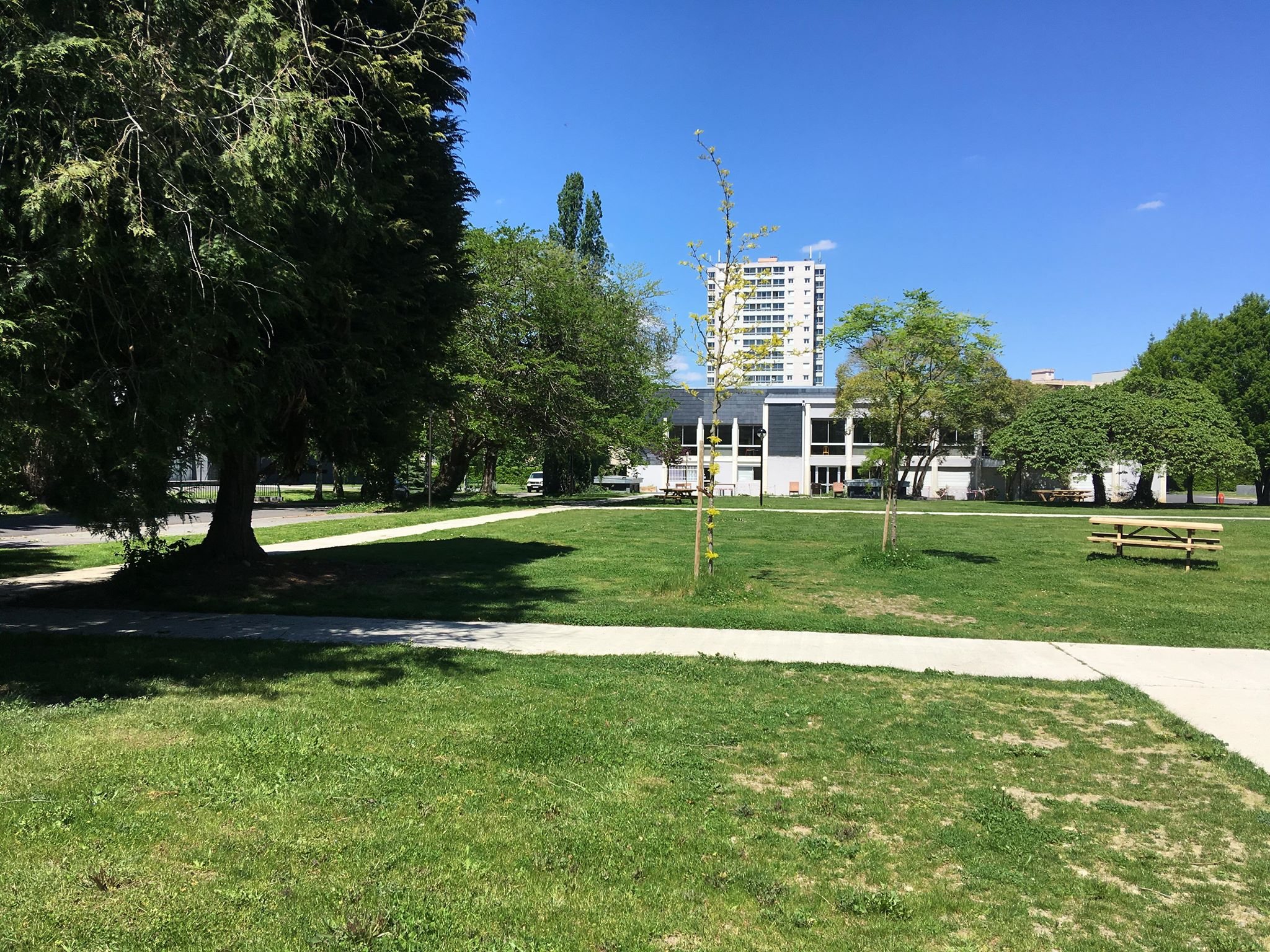
Tarbes university campus with the cafeteria.

== Admissions ==
The main admission (60%) to the ENIT is made through a selective examination during the year leading to the French “baccalauréat”, most of the successful candidates come from the scientific stream.

There is however further possibilities to join the ENIT later on after 2 years of studies in a University Institutes of Technology, in a Higher School Preparatory Classes, or at the University, the selection being on academic records.

Foreign students can join ENIT via this traditional engineering studies route or via the exchange route (semester in either French or English).

== Curriculum ==
ENIT trains general engineers in five years that leads to the “Diplôme d'Ingénieur” degree, which is the equivalent of a five-year Master of Engineering degree (MEng.) or Master of Science (MsC) (300 validated ECTS).

Following a “common trunk” of 3 years during which the fundamentals sciences (mathematics, physics, chemistry and electronics), engineering sciences (mechanics, design, manufacturing, industrial engineering, industrial IT, materials), and humanities sciences (communication, management, economics + English, espagnol, German languages) are taught, students specialize during the next 2 years in 5 different departments:

- Mechanical engineering
- Industrial engineering
- Buildings and public works
- Engineering of Materials and Structures and Processes
- Integrated Systems Design

Like most all of the French educational system the ENIT is following the tradition of the Encyclopédistes which focus on breadth rather than depth. It is particularly useful for cross fertilization purposes between different fields. In the final year, students must present a final year project. ENIT emphasizes industrial experience by making it compulsory for students to carry out three internships in industry and an industrially-based final project / master's thesis:

- 10 weeks, technical level, in semester 3
- 20 weeks, assistant engineer level, in semester 6
- 20 weeks, professional engineer level, in semester 10, final project in industry or laboratory / master's thesis

The school also delivers master's degrees in research and double degrees in partnership with schools of National Polytechnic Institute of Toulouse or foreign schools.

== International Partnerships ==
ENIT has signed agreements with universities both in and outside the European Union to promote cooperation in education and research activities. These partnerships involve exchange of students and faculty, internship placements for students and promotion of joint activities in training and research. It's a member of the Lifelong Learning Program with 99 partner universities in 33 countries: Europe (Austria, Belgium, Czech Republic, Estonia, Finland, Germany, Hungary, Italy, Latvia, Lithuania, North Macedonia, Norway, Netherlands, Poland, Portugal, Romania, Russia, Slovakia, Slovenia, Spain, Sweden, United Kingdom), Asia (Japan, Lebanon, South Korea ), North America (Canada), Latin America (Argentina, Brazil, Colombia, Costa Rica, Mexico) and Africa (Ghana, Morocco). Moreover, it has been awarded the Erasmus Charter for Higher Education (ECHE) by the European Commission.

Students who want to take part in these exchange programs go through a selective process based on academic criteria. Once a committee of teachers has selected the students, the International Student Office takes care of the mobility process. More than 60% of ENIT students have an international experience (Internship or exchange : Erasmus+, “FITEC” program, “LACCEI” program, European project semester, double degree) during their academic studies.

Classes of 7, 8 and 9 semesters engineering cycle are open to international students. For a French language course semester, they need a minimum B1 level in French and must have completed 3 years' study at their first university (180 validated ECTS).

Foreign students can also carry out an English language course semester with the European Project Semester (EPS), which is a 16-week industrial project offered to third, fourth and fifth-year engineering students in the fields of mechanical, industrial, electrical/electronic, IT and materials engineering, etc. ENIT is the only French school partner of this English language exchange program.

Lecturers can also benefit from the L.L.P. scheme and, accordingly, visiting professors and guest lecturers are invited to give courses at ENIT in English each year.

== Laboratory and Research ==
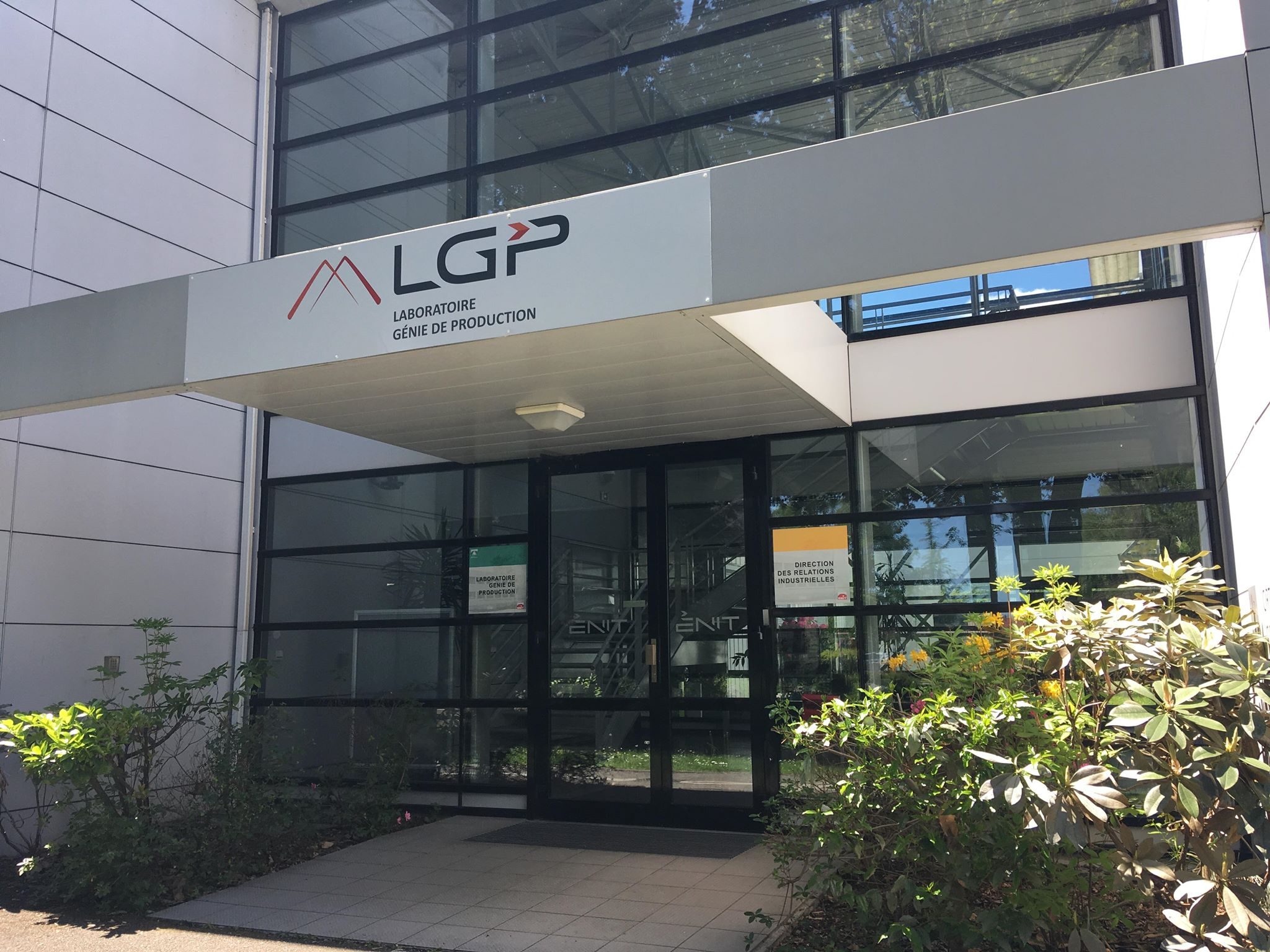
The Production Engineering Laboratory.

The “Laboratoire de génie de production” or LGP (English: Production Engineering Laboratory) is housed at the ENIT since 1989. It's part of the research pole of the University of Toulouse and it teams up with the National Polytechnic Institute of Toulouse (INPT). In 2022, 53 “teachers-researchers” (19 full professors/readers and 34 associate professors/lecturers), 14 postdoctoral researchers and 55 PhD students work in 2 scientific departments:

- Scientific department “Mechanics, Materials, Process”
- Scientific department “Systems”

Moreover, ENIT via INPT is jointly approved in several PhD courses, with 5 doctoral schools.

== Student life ==
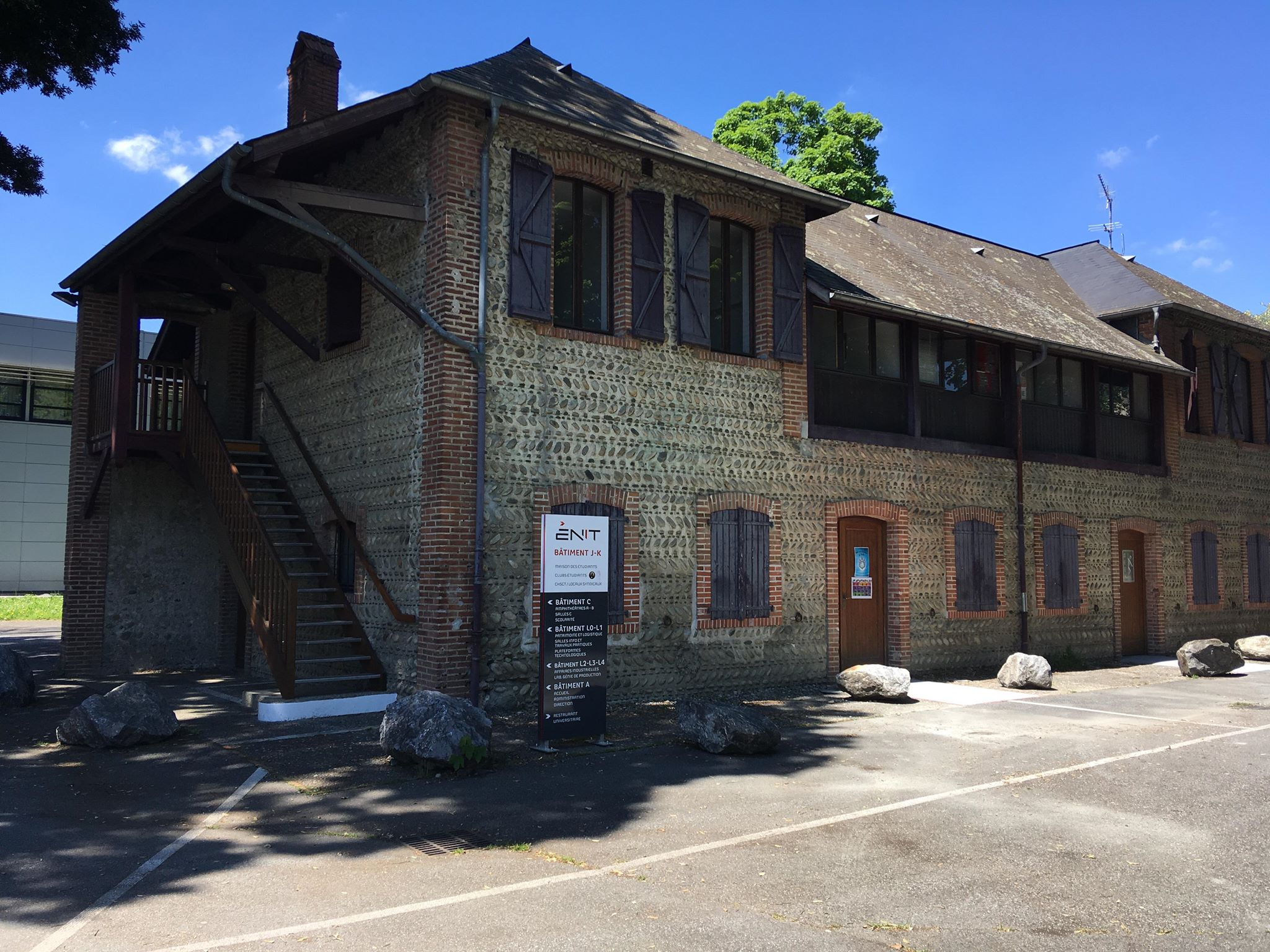
The house of students with the entry of the International CLub.

ENIT has a wealth of student life which enables each student to express themselves through their interests. Students associations are:

- Student office “Bureau des élèves”: Brings students together by organising a range of sports, cultural or technical clubs, supporting various promotions and organising major events
- International Club: Promotes the integration of foreign exchange students into the school, sets up the “Buddy scheme” where ENIT students befriend foreign students
- House association “Foyer”
- 1st, 2nd, 3rd, 4th and 5th year student associations
- Various clubs: “Cacophony” (music), “Sono Sam” (sound), aero-modelling, mechanics, mountain, skiing, motorcycling, photography, geek, gala association, etc

== See also ==
=== Relative articles ===
- Grandes écoles
- Master of Engineering
- Diplôme d'Ingénieur

=== External links ===
- Ecole Nationale d'Ingénieurs de Tarbes
- Association Nationale des Ingénieurs ENIT
- International Club ENIT account
