= École Nationale Supérieure des Ingénieurs en Arts Chimiques et Technologiques =

French graduate school

Coordinates: 43°33′19″N 1°30′14″E

Toulouse Graduate School of Chemical, Materials, and Industrial Engineering
- École nationale supérieure des ingénieurs en arts chimiques et technologiques
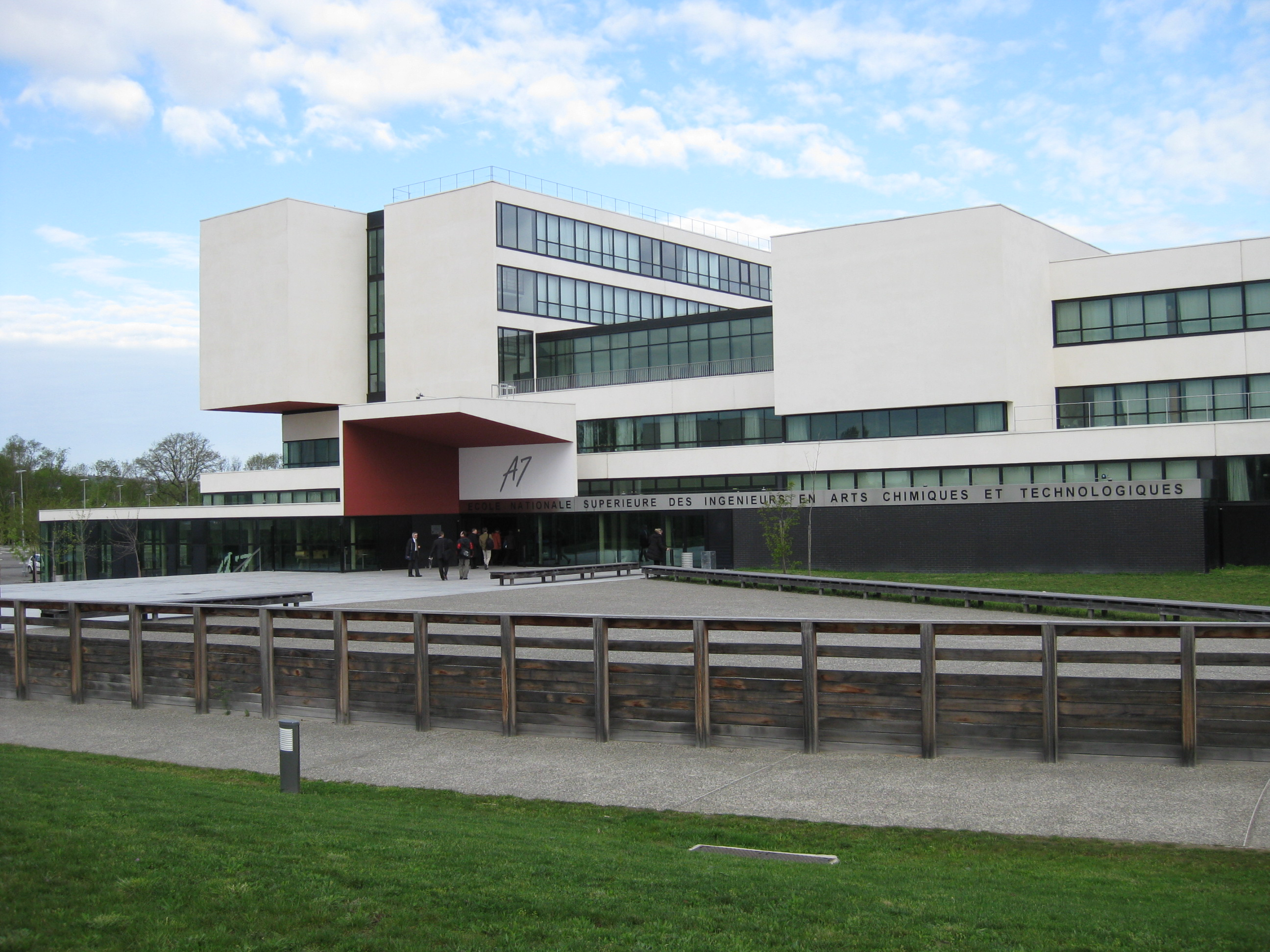
- Main Entrance 2012
- Type: School of engineering
- Established: 1906
- Affiliations: Toulouse Tech, Université fédérale de Toulouse Midi-Pyrénées
- Director: Laurent Prat
- Students: 750
- Location: Toulouse, France
- University system: National Polytechnic Institute of Toulouse
- Nickname: A7
- Website: www.ensiacet.fr

The École nationale supérieure des ingénieurs en arts chimiques et technologiques (French pronunciation: [ekɔl nɑsjɔnal sypeʁjœʁ dez‿ɛ̃ʒenjœʁ ɑ̃n‿aʁ ʃimik e tɛknɔlɔʒik]), or INP-ENSIACET (or A7), is a selective grande école, located in Toulouse, France.

== Departments ==
Teaching departments	Chemistry, materials, chemical engineering, process engineering, industrial engineering
1st semester	Core modules
2nd – 4th semester	5 majors (chemistry, materials, chemical engineering, process engineering, industrial engineering)
5th – 6th semester	One of 13 options (environmental engineering, fluids and processes, eco energy, physico-chemical analyses, design and analysis of processes, green chemistry, quality-safety-environment, management of industrial systems, industrial systems, functional materials, processes for fine chemistry and bio-industries, durability of materials and of structures, management of complex projects and information systems)
Duration of courses	3 years
Levels	From L3 to master's degree
