= ENSEEIHT =

Engineering school in Toulouse, France

Coordinates: 43°36′07″N 1°27′19″E

- Type: Grande École
- Established: 1907
- Director: Martial Coulon
- Students: 1500
- Location: Toulouse, France
- Campus: Urban, center of Toulouse
- Affiliations: National Polytechnic Institute of Toulouse, Institut Mines-Télécom, Toulouse Tech, University of Toulouse
- Colors: Blue
- Website: www.enseeiht.fr

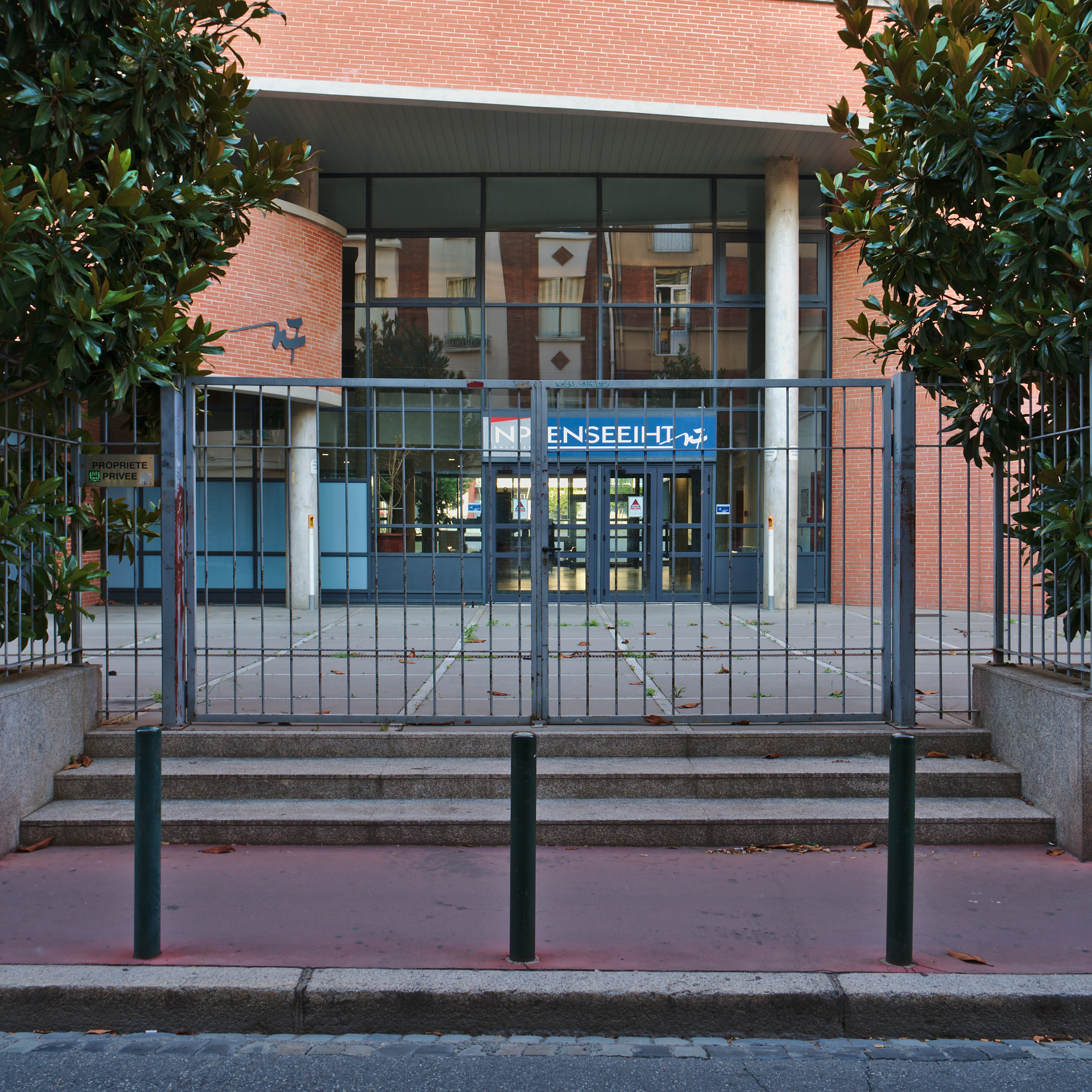
Main entry.

The École nationale supérieure d'électrotechnique, d'électronique, d'informatique, d'hydraulique et des télécommunications (French pronunciation: [ekɔl nɑsjɔnal sypeʁjœʁ delɛktʁɔtɛknik delɛktʁɔnik dɛ̃fɔʁmatik didʁolik e de telekɔmynikɑsjɔ̃]; abbr. ENSEEIHT) is a French engineering school (Grande École) which offers education in Electrical Engineering, Electronics, Computer Science, Hydraulics and Telecommunications.

The INP-ENSEEIHT is a top-ranking French public engineering school, under the trust of the Ministry of National Education, Higher Education and Research and in an agreement with the prestigious Ecole polytechnique. INP-ENSEEIHT is one of the seven components of the National Polytechnic Institute of Toulouse.

The standard curriculum is a three-year program leading to the French Diplôme d'Ingénieur, considered by European universities (Bologna declaration) as a master's degree of the European Higher Education Area. The ENSEEIHT is part of Institut National Polytechnique de Toulouse (Toulouse INP) which is itself part of the University of Toulouse. The school is also an associated school of the Institut Mines-Télécom.

== History ==
The school was founded in 1907 by the Toulouse city council with the purpose of training engineers for the South-Western France electrical and hydraulic networks development.

In the 1930s, Charles Camichel, the first director of the school, develops research on hydraulics. Hydraulics then contributed to the reputation of the school.

In 1948, the school became an ENSI - French abbreviation for National Superior School of Engineering - under the direction of Léopold Escande. This was an acknowledgement of the high level of the training and the research works.

== Admissions ==
As a Grande École, the school recruits the majority of the students after the selection made by the competitive examination which is the final step of two years of intensive Classes Préparatoires aux Grandes Écoles. Each department has its own required admission rank that is determined by the number of candidates that want to integrate the department. Other ways to integrate the school exist, some students are admitted to the school after the university or after two years of specific integrated preparatory classes at the Institut National Polytechnique de Toulouse.

== Academics ==
=== Programs ===
The standard curriculum is the French specific three-year program in engineering that leads to the Diplôme d'Ingénieur degree. This degree is officially considered as a master's degree of the European Higher Education Area by the European Bologna declaration.

The five departments of the school are :

- Electrical Engineering and Automation
- Electronics and Signal Processing
- Computer Science and Applied Mathematics
- Hydraulics and Fluid Mechanics
- Telecommunications and Networks

The school also delivers Mastères Spécialisés (Specialized Masters), that are one or two years specialized programs in research that can be made after a master's degree.

=== Double degree ===
The school offers several opportunities to achieve a double degree with, for example, Georgia Institute of Technology (Georgia Tech) in Atlanta, GA (USA), Chalmers University of Technology in Gothenburg, Sweden or with Imperial College in London, United Kingdom.

=== Partnerships ===
For many years, the school has established many partnerships with other French and international universities and institutes of technology.

The ENSEEIHT is also an application school for the École polytechnique.

== Alumni ==
=== CEOs and top-managers ===
- Frédéric Giron, Vice-President at Springboard Research India.
- Robert Havas, Director of the National Agency for Industry Innovation.
- Marc Jalabert, Marketing and Operations Director at Microsoft France.
- Bernard Parisot, President and co-CEO of JCDecaux North America
- Jérôme Seydoux, a French businessman, former CEO and current co-president of Pathé, the French most influential company in cinema production, distribution and theaters.
- Laurent Rossi, chief executive officer at Automobiles Alpine and Alpine F1 Team
- Denis Terrien, Founder and former Director at amazon.fr
- Antoine Zacharias, former CEO of Vinci (CAC 40 firm)
- Nawfal Trabelsi, CEO of McDonald France

=== Entrepreneurs ===
- Michel Meyer, Founder of Multimania and Kewego
- Erik Robertson, Founder of Multimania and founding CTO of Vistaprint
- Frédéric Montagnon, Founder of Overblog, Nomao and Codanova
- Eric Hautemont, Founder of Raydream and Days of Wonder
- Pascal Belloncle, Founder of Raydream
- Andy Albani, Co-Founder and CEO of Dance Reality and Founder of HurryOut

=== Other ===
- Laurent Broomhead, French National television show presenter
- Valerian Dovgalevsky, Russian bolshevik and Soviet statesman
- Sophie Lacaze, composer
- Gauvain Sers, singer and songwriter
- Gérard Le Lann, computer scientist

== See also ==
- National Polytechnic Institute of Toulouse
- Institut Télécom
- University of Toulouse
