= Université Nantes Angers Le Mans =

French academic consortium 2009–2016

L'Université Nantes Angers Le Mans (L'UNAM)
- Established: 31 December 2008; 17 years ago
- President: Jacques Girardeau
- Academic staff: 4,200
- Students: 76,000
- Doctoral students: 2,300
- Location: Nantes Angers Le Mans, Pays de la Loire, France
- Website: www.lunam.fr/en

L'Université Nantes Angers Le Mans is a consortium of universities, graduate schools, as well as teaching hospitals and research institutes from the Pays de la Loire region in France.

== History ==
- April 18, 2006: the law on research programs encourages "cooperation between research players.
- December 31, 2008: official creation of the University of Nantes-Angers-Le Mans (UNAM) in the form of a research and higher education cluster (Pres) and the status of a public scientific cooperation establishment (EPCS).
- June 29, 2009: official launch of the Pres. Daniel Martina, President of the University of Angers, is elected President of the Pres.

== Founding members ==
- University of Nantes
- University of Angers
- University of Maine
- Ecole Centrale de Nantes
- Ecole des Mines de Nantes
- Agrocampus Ouest
- Oniris
- Nantes University Hospital
- Angers University Hospital
- ESA group
- Audencia Nantes

== Associate members ==
- CNAM
- Arts et Métiers - Angers
- ENSA Nantes
- Ecole de design Nantes Atlantique
- ESBA Nantes Métropole
- ESBA TALM
- ENSM
- ESSCA
- ESEO group
- ESB group
- ICAM
- Ismans
- Integrated Center for Oncology
- Ifremer
- Ifsttar
- Inserm
- Université Catholique de l'Ouest
