= École nationale de la météorologie =

French graduate engineering school in meteorology

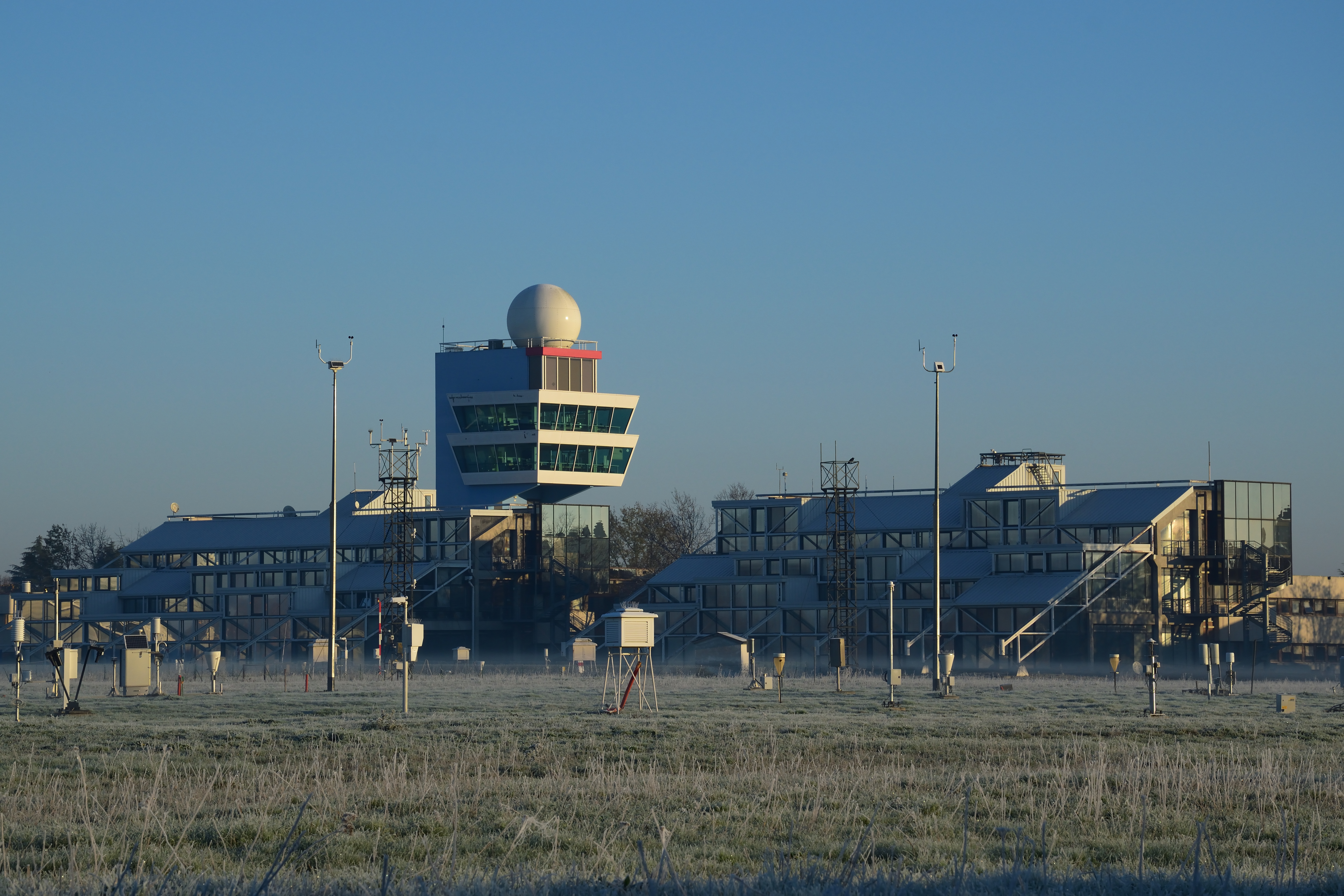
- École nationale de la météorologie (ENM) photographed in November 2020 from the Météopôle instrument test site. The ENM's observation tower is topped by Météo-France's Toulouse operational weather radar.
- Other names: ENM
- Type: Public
- Established: 1922
- Affiliations: Toulouse Tech; University of Toulouse; National Polytechnic Institute of Toulouse
- Students: 350
- Location: Toulouse, France; 43°34′30.948″N 1°22′20.705″E
- Website: meteofrance.fr/enm

École nationale de la météorologie (French pronunciation: [ekɔl nɑsjɔnal də la meteɔʁɔlɔʒi]; Occitan: Escòla nacionala de la meteorologia; abbr. ENM) is a Graduate Engineering school in meteorology in Toulouse, France, with roots back to 1948 as the École de la météorologie. It is one of the grandes écoles. The university has its own campus and an annex at the École nationale de l'aviation civile campus for the aviation related subjects.

Its different curricula lead to the following French & European degrees :

- Ingénieur ENM (ENM Graduate engineer Masters level program) ;
- Technician in meteorology degree ;
- Master of Science degree in climatology;
- Mastère Spécialisé degree.

Academic activities and industrial applied research are performed mainly in French language. Students from a dozen of nationalities participate to the different curricula at École nationale de la météorologie.

Most of the 350 graduate engineer students at ENM live in dedicated residential buildings nearby research labs and metro public transports.
