= École nationale supérieure d'architecture de Toulouse =

Coordinates: 43°34′46.893″N 1°23′50.686″E

- Type: Public
- Established: 1969
- Affiliations: University of Toulouse
- Chancellor: Monique Reyre
- Students: 900
- Location: Toulouse, France
- Website: www.toulouse.archi.fr

The École nationale supérieure d'architecture de Toulouse is a French school of architecture, a unit of the University of Toulouse.

== Diploma ==
The school delivers the following diplomas in architecture :

- Bachelor's degree
- Master's degree.

== Research ==
Around 50 researchers work at the "Research Laboratory in architecture" since 1970. They participate in the establishment of the foundations of architectural, urban and landscape research.
