= École d'ingénieurs de Purpan =

Graduate Engineering school in France

- Type: Private, non profit
- Established: 1919
- Affiliations: National Polytechnic Institute of Toulouse; University of Toulouse
- Students: 1,000
- Location: Toulouse, France; 43°36′2.831″N 1°24′12.93″E
- Website: www.purpan.fr

Located in the campus of University of Toulouse in France, École d'ingénieurs de Purpan (French pronunciation: [ekɔl dɛ̃ʒenjœʁ də pyʁpɑ̃]) is a Graduate Engineering school, created in 1919. It is one of the National Polytechnic Institute of Toulouse schools.

Its different curricula lead to the following French & European degrees :

- Ingénieur Purpan (Purpan Graduate engineer Masters level program)
- Bachelor's degree
- Master's degree

Academic activities and industrial applied research are performed mainly in French and English languages. Students from a dozen of nationalities participate to the different curricula at Purpan.

Most of the 1000 graduate engineer students at Purpan live in dedicated residential buildings nearby research labs and metro public transports on a campus that is shared with 100,000 students from University of Toulouse.

== Research at Purpan ==
- Life sciences
- Agriculture
- Food science
- Marketing
- Management

== Alumni ==
- Yannick Jauzion, French former rugby union footballer
