= Institut catholique d'arts et métiers =

French graduate engineering school

- Other names: ICAM
- Type: Private (non profit), Graduate engineering
- Established: 1898
- Affiliations: Toulouse Tech; Université fédérale de Toulouse Midi-Pyrénées
- Students: 4,000
- Location: Lille, Sénart, Nantes, La Roche-sur-Yon, Toulouse, Vannes, France
- Website: www.icam.fr

Located in six cities in France, Institut catholique d'arts et métiers is a Graduate Engineering school created in 1898. It is one of the grandes écoles part of Toulouse Tech.

Its different curricula lead to the following French & European degrees :

- Ingénieur ICAM (ICAM Graduate engineer Masters level program)
- Master of Science & PhD doctorate studies
- Mastères Spécialisés (MS) (Specialized Masters)

Academic activities and industrial applied research are performed mainly in French and English languages. Students from a dozen nationalities participate in the different curricula at ICAM.

Most of the 4,500 graduate engineer students at ICAM live in dedicated residential buildings nearby research labs and metro public transports.

== Research at ICAM ==
- Energy storage and management
- Industrial co-products and waste recycling
- Innovative materials and treatments
- Structures and Couplings
- Industrial, environmental and societal changes
- Factory 4.0

== Notable alumni ==
- Modou Dia, Senegalese politician and former diplomat;
- Jean-Marie Vanlerenberghe, French politician;
- Octave Klaba, founder and chairman of OVHcloud.

== See also ==
- List of Jesuit sites
