= National Polytechnic Institute of Toulouse =

University system in France

- Formation: 1969
- Type: Institute of Technology
- Chairman: Dominique Poquillon
- Treasurier: Gilles Boucher
- Foreign Relationships: Joëlle Courbières
- Communication & Public relations: Florence Lauriac
- Website: www.inp-toulouse.fr

National Polytechnic Institute of Toulouse (French: Institut national polytechnique de Toulouse, pronounced [ɛ̃stity nɑsjɔnal pɔlitɛknik də tuluz]; abbr. Toulouse INP) is a French university cluster based in Toulouse, France, part of the University of Toulouse. It was founded in 1969. The institute is composed of seven schools (six engineering schools and one school of veterinary medicine) and 17 research laboratories. The institute delivers master's degrees and Ph.D. It is a member of Institut au service du spatial, de ses applications et technologies.

== Composition ==
The seven schools of the institute are:

=== Engineering schools ===
- École Nationale Supérieure d'Électronique, d'Électrotechnique, d'Informatique, d'Hydraulique et des Télécommunications (ENSEEIHT)
- École nationale supérieure des ingénieurs en arts chimiques et technologiques (ENSIACET)
- École Nationale Supérieure Agronomique de Toulouse (ENSAT)
- École nationale d'ingénieurs de Tarbes (ENIT)
- École d'ingénieurs de Purpan (EIP)
- École Nationale de la Météorologie (ENM)

=== School of veterinary medicine ===
- École nationale vétérinaire de Toulouse (ENVT)
