= Funding =

Act of providing resources

Funding is the act of providing resources to finance a need, program, or project. While this is usually in the form of money, it can also take the form of effort or time from an organization or company. Generally, this word is used when a firm uses its internal reserves to satisfy its necessity for cash, while the term financing is used when the firm acquires capital from external sources.

Sources of funding include credit, venture capital, donations, grants, savings, subsidies, and taxes. Funding methods such as donations, subsidies, and grants that have no direct requirement for return of investment are described as "soft funding" or "crowdfunding". Funding that facilitates the exchange of equity ownership in a company for capital investment via an online funding portal per the Jumpstart Our Business Startups Act (alternately, the "JOBS Act of 2012") (U.S.) is known as equity crowdfunding. Funds can be allocated for either short-term or long-term purposes.

== Economics ==
The flow of funds from lender to borrower

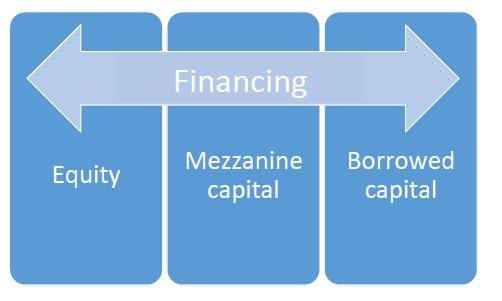
Types of financing/funding

In economics funds are injected into the market as capital by lenders and taken as loans by borrowers. There are two ways in which the capital can end up at the borrower. The lender can lend the capital to a financial intermediary against interest. These financial intermediaries then reinvest the money against a higher rate. The use of financial intermediaries to finance operations is called indirect finance. A lender can also go to the financial markets to directly lend to a borrower. This method is called direct finance.

== Purpose ==
=== Research ===
Research funding is funding used for research-related purposes. It is most often used to describe funding in the fields of technology or social science. The allocation of funds are usually granted based on a per project, department, or institute basis stemming from scope of the research or project. Research funding can be split into commercial and non-commercial allocations.

Research and development departments of a corporation normally provide commercial research funding. Whereas, non-commercial research funding is obtained from charities, research councils, or government agencies. Organizations that require such funding normally have to go through competitive selections. Only those that have the most potential would be chosen. Funding is vital in ensuring the sustainability of certain projects.

=== Launch a business ===
Entrepreneurs with a business concept would want to accumulate all the necessary resources including capital to venture into a market. Funding is part of the process, as some businesses would require large start-up sums that individuals would not have. These start-up funds are essential to kick-start a business idea, without it, entrepreneurs would not have the ability to carry out their concepts in the business world.

=== Investment ===
Fund management companies gather pools of money from many investors and use them to purchase securities. These funds are managed by professional investment managers, which may generate higher returns with reduced risks by asset diversification. The size of these funds could be as little as a few millions or as much as multi billions. The purpose of these funding activities is mainly aiming to pursue individual or organization profits.

== Types ==
=== Personal funding ===
Personal funding involves using personal finances to fund an initiative. This could include savings, personal loans, or funds from friends and family. It is common in the early stages of a business or project when other sources of funding may not be accessible.

=== Corporate funding ===
Corporate funding involves funds provided by corporations, often in the form of investments or loans. Corporations might provide funding for other businesses, especially in industries where there is a strategic benefit.

=== Government funding ===
Government funding is provided by local, state, or federal governments to support specific projects or activities. This type of funding can come in the form of grants, subsidies, or loans. Government funding is often aimed at promoting public policies or supporting economic growth and development.

=== Angel investors ===
Angel investors are affluent individuals who provide capital for a business start-up and small business, usually in exchange for convertible debt or ownership equity. They are often among an entrepreneur's family and friends. The funds they provide can be a one-time investment to help the business get off the ground or an ongoing injection to support and carry the company through its difficult early stages.

=== Venture capital ===
Venture capital is a type of private equity and a form of financing that is provided by firms or funds to small, early-stage, emerging firms that are deemed to have high growth potential or which have demonstrated high growth. Venture capital investments are generally made in exchange for equity in the company.

=== Grants ===
Grants are funds provided by one party, often a government department, corporation, foundation, or trust, to a recipient, typically a nonprofit entity, educational institution, business, or individual. Unlike loans, grants do not need to be repaid.

=== Loans ===
Loans are borrowed sums of money that are expected to be paid back with interest. They can be provided by banks, credit unions, or other financial institutions. Loans are a common form of funding for businesses, individuals, and governments.

=== Equity financing ===
Equity financing involves raising capital through the sale of shares in an enterprise. Equity financing is essentially the sale of an ownership interest to raise funds for business purposes. This type of financing is typically used by startups and growing businesses to raise capital.

=== Debt financing ===
Debt financing involves borrowing money to be repaid, plus interest, at a later date. Common types of debt financing include traditional bank loans, personal loans, bonds, and lines of credit. This form of financing is advantageous because it does not require giving up ownership of the business.

=== Guarantees ===
One form of guarantee creates a conditional liability to make a payment, whereby the guarantor will pay the principal debt holder fails to do so. Effectively when the liability to make a payment is trigged the guarantor becomes a funder.

== Methods ==
=== Government grants ===
Government could allocate funds itself or through government agencies to projects that benefit the public through a selection process to students or researchers and even organizations. At least two external peer-reviewers and an internal research award committee review each application. The research awards committee would meet some time to discuss shortlisted applications. A further shortlist and ranking is made. Projects are funded and applicants are informed. Econometric evidence shows public grants for firms can create additionality in jobs, sales, value added, innovation and capital. For example, this was shown to be the case for large R&D grants, as well as smaller public grants for the tourism firms or small and medium sized firms in general.

Government grants are offered by various levels of government to support projects that benefit the public. Supported projects may include funding for scientific research, infrastructure development, public health initiatives, and education programs. Examples include the Pell Grant in the United States, which helps low-income students pay for college, and the Horizon Europe program, which funds research and innovation projects across Europe.

For businesses, government grants are financial contributions provided by governmental organizations to help businesses achieve specific goals, such as innovation, expansion, job creation, and export development. For example, in Canada, the CanExport program helps businesses expand into international markets by covering expenses related to travel, marketing, and trade shows. Unlike interest-free loans, grants do not need to be repaid, making them an attractive funding option for businesses looking to reduce financial risk.

=== Crowdfunding ===
Crowdfunding exists in mainly two types, reward-based crowdfunding and equity-based crowdfunding. In the former, small firms could pre-sell a product or service to start a business whereas in the latter, backers buy a certain amount of shares of a firm in exchange of money.

As for reward-based crowdfunding, project creators would set a funding target and deadline. Anyone who is interested can pledge on the projects. Projects must reach its targeted amount in order for it to be carried out. Once the projects ended with enough funds, projects creators would have to make sure that they fulfill their promises by the intended timeline and delivery their products or services.

=== Raise from investors ===
To raise capital, you require funds from investors who are interested in the investments. You have to present those investors with high-return projects. By displaying high-level potentials of the projects, investors would be more attracted to put their money into those projects. After a certain amount of time, usually in a year's time, rewards of the investment will be shared with investors. This makes investors happy and they may continue to invest further.

If returns do not meet the intended level, this could reduce the willingness of investors to invest their money into the funds. Hence, the amounts of financial incentives are highly weighted determinants to ensure the funding remains at a desirable level. Venture Capital (VC) is a subdivision of Private Equity wherein external investors fund small-scale startups that have high growth potential in the long run. Investors receive a portion of the company’s equity in return for the money invested by them. The amount of money that a Venture capital firm can raise is predominantly built on the Principal-agent relationship between the Limited Partners and the Venture Capital Firm.

=== Self-Organized Funding Allocation ===
Self-organized funding allocation (SOFA) is a method of distributing funding for scientific research. In this system, each researcher is allocated an equal amount of funding, and is required to anonymously allocate a fraction of their funds to the research of others. Proponents of SOFA argue that it would result in similar distribution of funding as the present grant system, but with less overhead. In 2016, a test pilot of SOFA began in the Netherlands.

== Securing loans ==
A company or an individual may secure a loan to get access to capital. Often borrowers must use a secured loan where assets are pledged as collateral. If the borrower defaults, ownership of the collateral reverts to the lender. Both tangible and intangible assets can be used to secure loans. The use of IP as collateral in IP-backed finance transactions is the subject of a report series at the World Intellectual Property Organization.

== Withdrawal ==
Withdrawal of funding, or defunding, occurs when funding previously given to an organisation ceases, especially in relation to Governmental funding.

Defunding could be as a result of a disagreement or failure to meet set objectives. An example that explains the withdrawal of funding in this case is that of President Trump's decision to stop funding the World Health Organization (WHO) over alleged Coronavirus mismanagement.

== See also ==
- Crowdfunding
- Dependency theory
- Equity fund
- Foundation (non-profit)
- Investment
  - Investment fund
- Peer-to-peer lending
- Research funding
- Seed money
- Micro finance
- Mutual fund
- Trust Fund
- Intangible asset finance
- Funding of science
