= Institute of Pharmacology and Structural Biology =

Research centre

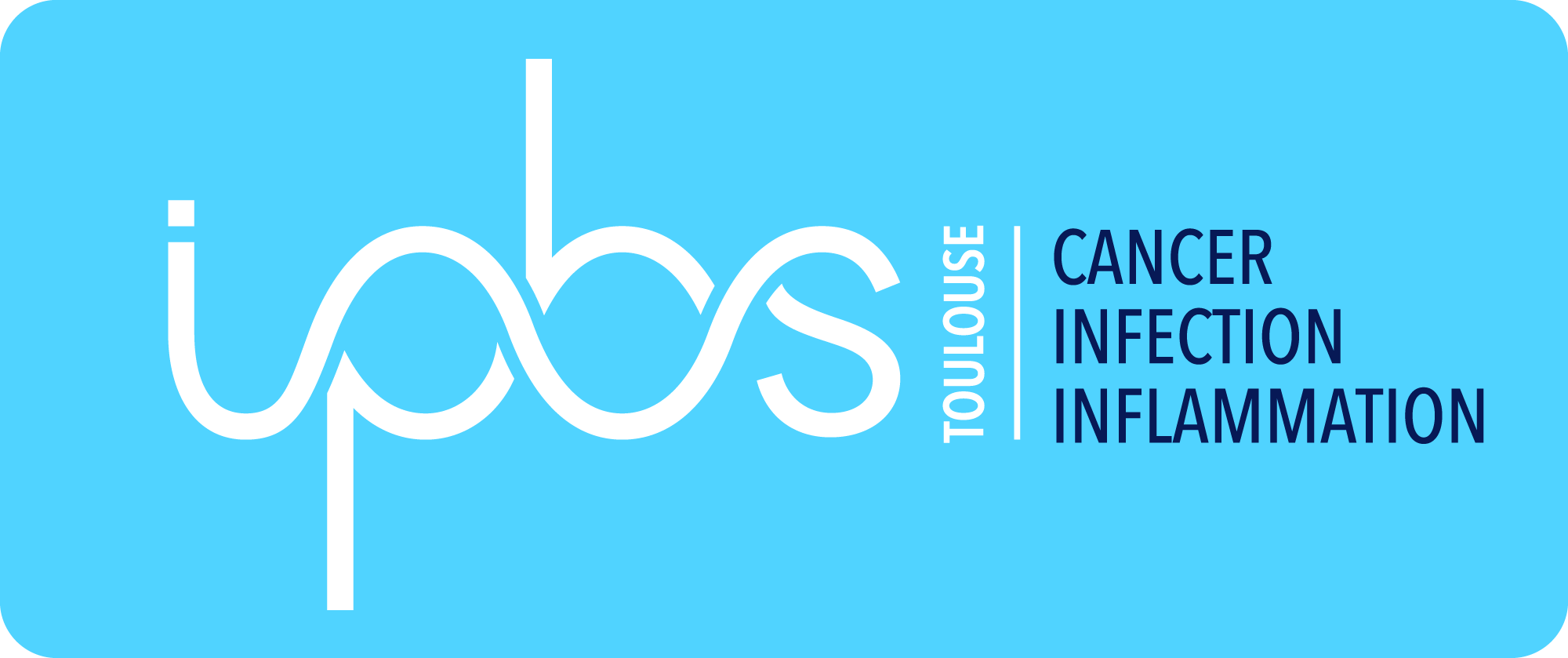
- Motto: Research and cutting-edge technological facilities in life sciences
- Established: 1996; 30 years ago
- Field of research: Oncology, Structural biology, Biophysics, Immunology, Tuberculosis
- Director: Olivier Neyrolles
- Staff: 260
- Location: 205, route de Narbonne 31077 Toulouse, Toulouse, Occitanie (administrative region), France; 43.5575423°N 1.4632037°E
- Operating agency: CNRS/Paul Sabatier University
- Website: ipbs.fr

The Institute of Pharmacology and Structural Biology (French: Institut de Pharmacologie et de Biologie Structurale, IPBS) is a research center run as a collaboration between the French National Centre for Scientific Research (French: Centre national de la recherche scientifique, CNRS) and Paul Sabatier University. It has a scientific and administrative staff of 260 people, including a large number of postdoctoral workers and postgraduate (master's and PhD) students. The primary objective of the institute is the identification and characterization of novel therapeutic targets in the fields of cancer and infectious diseases (particularly tuberculosis).

The institute is located on 205 route de Narbonne and shares the campus with Laboratoire de Chimie de Coordination (LCC).

The IPBS is a participant of Toulouse's emerging cancer and infectious diseases research network: a founding member of the Toulouse Biology Research Federation (FRBT), a scientific network of Toulouse's leading life sciences laboratories, an active member of the Cancéropole Grand Sud-Ouest, a partner in the Toulouse Oncopôle and a member of the Toulouse Cancer Laboratory of Excellence (LABEX TOUCAN).

In 2023, the Toulouse Biomedical Research Federative Structure (SFR-BMT, FED 4138) and the Toulouse Biology Research Federation (SFR-BT, FR 3451) will merge to become the “Biology and Biotechnology for Health” Research Federative Structure (SFR-B2S).

== History ==
=== From January 1, 2021 ===
The institute brings together 17 research teams working in close collaboration on two main areas of research in the fields of cancer, infection and inflammation: “Biology of the tissue and cellular microenvironment”, and “Structural and molecular mechanisms of disease”.

Olivier Neyrolles will head the IPBS-Toulouse from January 1, 2021. The IPBS's scientific strategy is to increase its visibility and attractiveness through international cooperation, by recruiting international team leaders, welcoming foreign students and researchers and participating in mobility programs such as the “International Research Projects” developed by the CNRS and the “Hubert Curien Partnerships” developed by the French Ministry of Europe and Foreign Affairs.

=== 2009–2020 ===
In January 2009, Dr. Jean-Philippe Girard succeeded Prof. François Amalric as Director of the institute. The current policy of the IPBS is to increase its international cooperation through hosting foreign students and researchers, currently numbering 21, and through participating in mobility programs such as the Joint Research Programs developed by the CNRS and the Hubert Curien Partnerships developed by the Ministry of Europe and Foreign Affairs.

=== 1999–2008 ===
Under the leadership of Professor François Amalric, the IPBS continued its work on the characterization and validation of new pharmacological targets using molecular and cell biology approaches, together with analysis of the structure/function relationships of biomolecules and their assemblies.

The Cancer Biology Department was created in 2005, and five new teams were established during the period from 2005 to 2008. These new teams supported the two main axes of research covered by the Department: DNA transactions and repair, and the microenvironment of tumors.

The Structural Biology and Biophysics Department was created in 2009 with the objective of enhancing the exposure of the IPBS in structural biology and biophysics.

=== 1996–1999 ===
Professor Jean Cros founded the IPBS in 1996, with the aim of applying the methods and concepts of modern cell, molecular and structural biology to the identification and validation of novel pharmacological targets in the fields of cancer and G-protein-coupled receptors. In December 1997, a new building was opened on the campus of the Paul Sabatier University to house all of the institute's groups on one site.

Between 1990 and 1995, new teams arrived to develop topics about tuberculosis, protein engineering and structural biology.

In 1972, Claude Paoletti and Jean Cros created the Laboratory of Basic Pharmacology and Toxicology (French: laboratoire de Pharmacologie et de Toxicologie fondamentale-LPTF), which in 1990 became the seventh French pole of the National Programme IMABIO (Macromolecules engineering). New topics such as oncology, neurology and genotoxicology emerged.

== Logos ==
In 2020, the IPBS is changing its logo and image to highlight the diseases on which researchers are focusing: cancer, infection and inflammation.

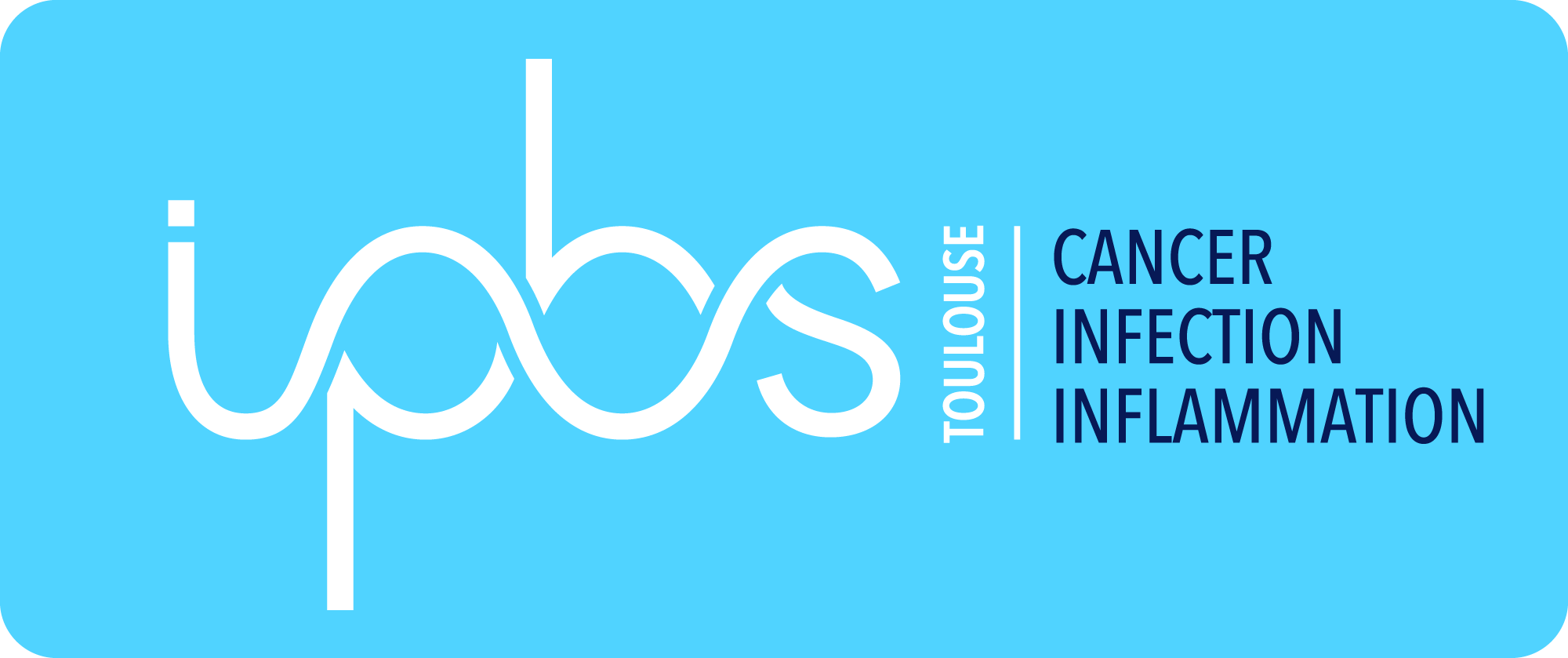
New 2020 logo – horizontal form

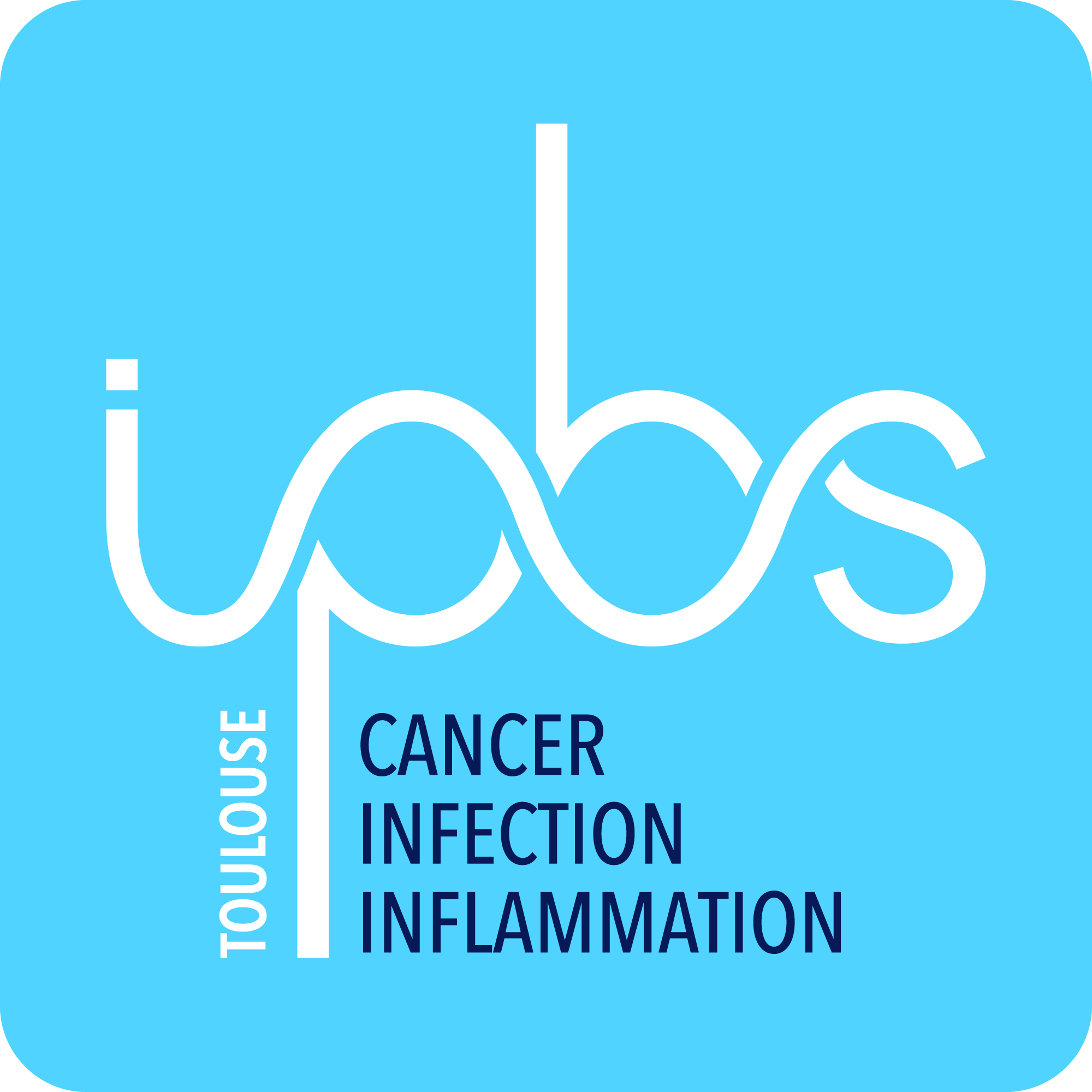
New 2020 logo – square shape

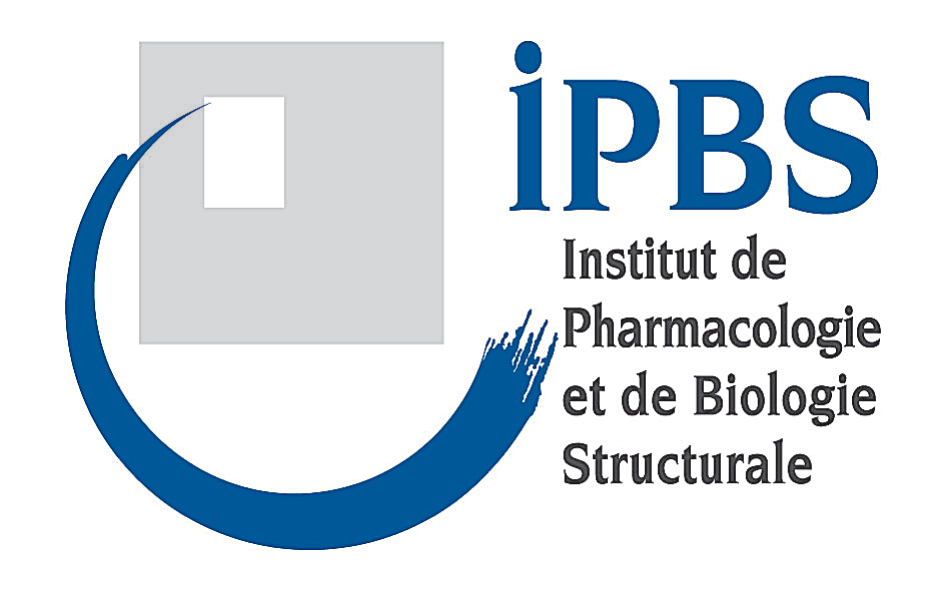
Former IPBS logo until 2016

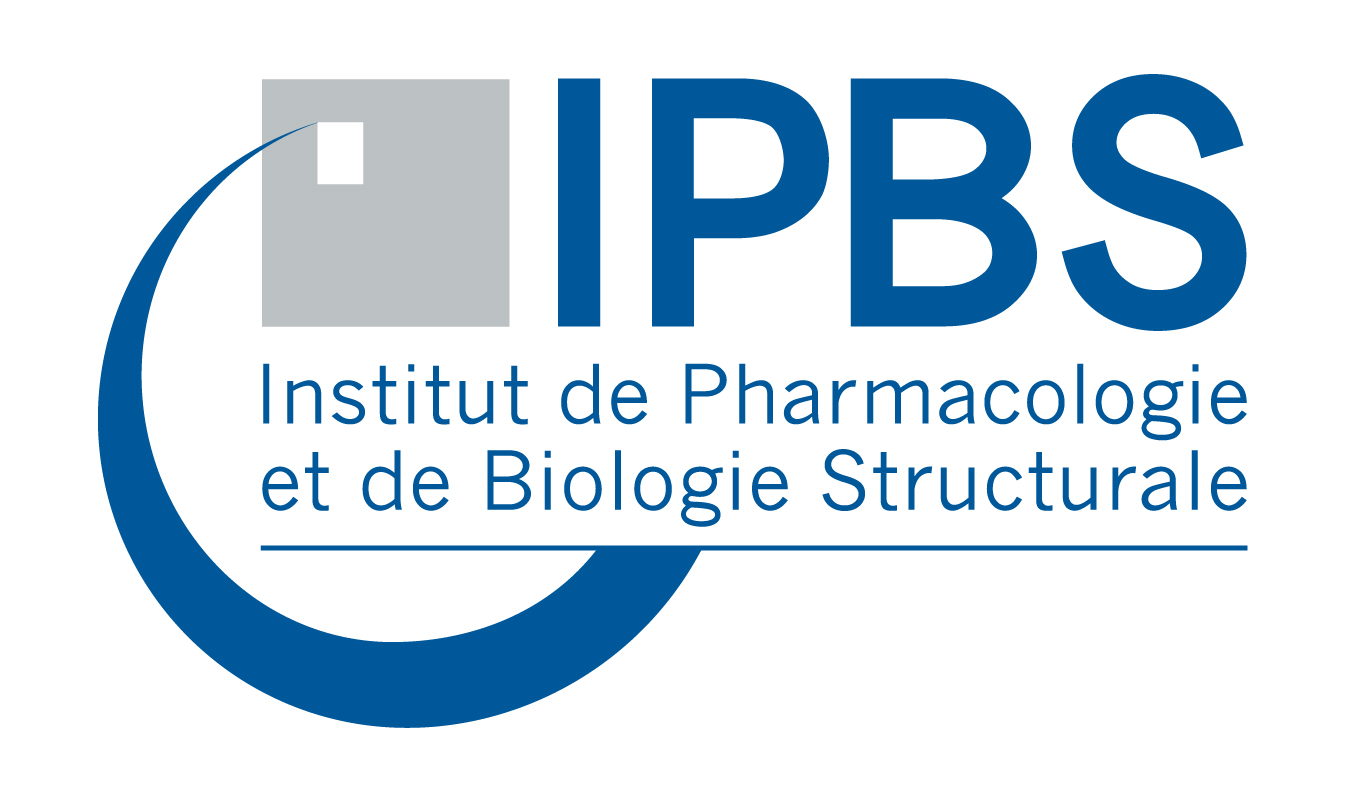
Current IPBS logo since 2016

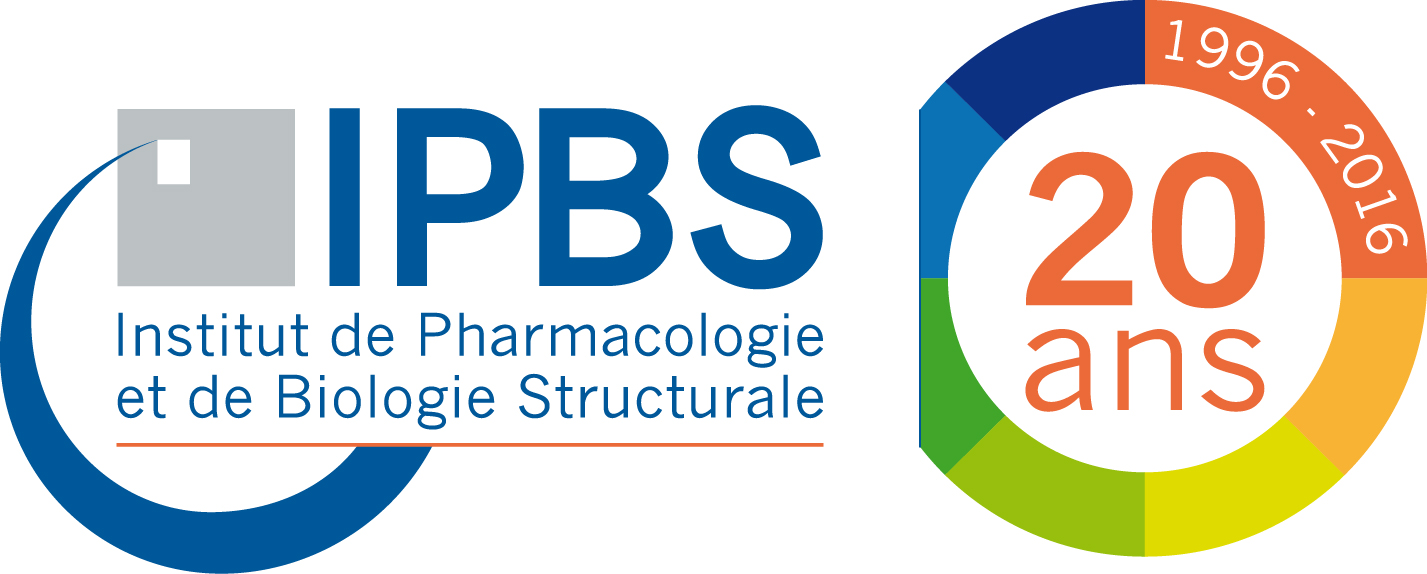
IPBS twentieth anniversary logo

== Research fields ==
The IPBS has 17 research teams. The new scientific objectives are based on two complementary lines of research related to cancer, inflammation and infectious diseases:

Biology of the tissue and cellular microenvironment - This first aspect of research will focus on the study, at tissue and cellular levels, of the microenvironment in disease and its influence on treatment. It will cover the following topics:

- Microenvironment in cancer, inflammation and infectious diseases: role in protection and susceptibility to disease, and impact on treatment
- Immune and inflammatory cells in cancer, inflammation and infectious diseases
- Eukaryotic and bacterial cell metabolism in cancer and infection

Structural and molecular mechanisms of disease : This second area of research will be linked, at the molecular level, to the study of structural and molecular mechanisms of disease, in order to characterize targets and to propose candidates for new therapies. It will cover the following themes:

- Structure-function-activity relationships of proteins and protein complexes in eukaryotic cells and bacteria, and rational design of functional ligands for the treatment of cancer and infections
- Genome stability
- Eukaryotic and bacterial lipids, membranes and envelopes
- Drug tolerance and resistance in cancer and infection

== Core facilities ==
IPBS supports technological facilities and equipment for use by the institute's researchers and external investigators. The institute hosts five technological platforms, all of them having the IBiSA label (national coordination of the life science platforms).

=== Main platforms ===
- ProteoToul Services: Proteomics Facility of Toulouse (Head: Dr Odile Burlet‐Schiltz)

This platform uses mass spectrometry and bioinformatics tools to handle programs in areas ranging from biology and health to agricultural applications.

- PICT ("Plateforme Intégrée de Criblage de Toulouse"; Head: Dr Laurent Maveyraud).

=== Partner platforms ===
The IPBS is a partner site for other platforms.

- TRI-IPBS | Microscopy (Head: Dr. Renaud Poincloux)
- TRI-IPBS | Cytometry (Head: Dr. Frédéric Lagarrigue)

The core facility uses time-lapse imaging to visualize complex systems from molecules to whole organisms, at time scales ranging from nanoseconds to several days. The facility also has instrumentation capable of phenotypic characterization and sorting of eukaryotic and prokaryotic cells by flow cytometry.

- IPBS-Anexplo (Head: Dr Magali Jacquier)

The IPBS zootechnics facilities are part of the life science core facility of Toulouse, which includes eight other sites with complementary technical skills.

All these technological facilities are part of Genotoul, a regional network of research platforms in life sciences, open to groups from both public and private sectors, and involved in technology development and innovation.

== Technological transfer and partnership with industry ==
The IPBS has a longstanding industrial focus, since 1999, IPBS has been active in partnership with industry.

In 2024, the start-up See2cure, developed through a collaboration between IPBS and the Institut Universitaire du Cancer de Toulouse (IUCT-Oncopole), was launched to enhance cancer surgery using fluorescence-guided techniques.

In 2023, the IPBS recruited a Business Developer in Biology, Health and Cosmetics, their mission includes:

- Identifying innovations and inventions within the laboratory
- Promoting research activities and technological expertise of the IPBS and CBI teams to private companies at local, national and international levels

In 2020, IPBS welcomed G.CLIPS Biotech, a small biotech company focused on researching therapeutic agents targeting membrane proteins.

From 1999 to 2003, the first public-private high throughput screening center between CNRS and Pierre Fabre SA was present at IPBS.

Since 1999, the IPBS has developed scientific collaborations and/or hosted activities of eight companies: Abtech (struck off on 1 September 2008), Endocube (struck off on 12 March 2008), Millegen (closed), Novaleads (struck off on 10 September 2014), Nanobiotix, Protein Bio Sensor (registered on 6 July 2005), Praxcell (struck off on 5 March 2012), Icelltis (registered on 10 January 2008).

The IPBS was awarded the INPI Innovation Trophies 2008 Award.

== Scientific Advisory Board (SAB) ==
The Scientific Advisory Board advises the Director and executive board on the scientific policy of the institute, public relations, and aspects relating to research team life cycles (creation, modification of research orientations, transition, etc.). The SAB also assesses the scientific projects conducted by each research team at the institute.

The SAB is composed of nine researchers, who are (in alphabetical order):

- Frederick Alt from Harvard Medical School
- Patrick Couvreur from Institut Galien Paris Sud
- Sabine Ehrt from Weill Cornell Medical College
- Wolf-Dietrich Hardt from ETH Zurich, Switzerland
- Kathryn S Lilley from University of Cambridge
- Fatima Mechta-Grigoriou from Curie Institute (Paris)
- David Russell from Cornell University
- Rajan Sankaranarayanan from Centre for Cellular and Molecular Biology Hyderabad, India
- Eric Solary from Institut Gustave Roussy

and an honorary member:

- Mina Bissell from Lawrence Berkeley National Laboratory

== International relations ==
The IPBS has been involved in many research networks under the European Commission’s Frameworks, from the Fifth Framework Programme for Research and Technological Development activities (FP5) to Horizon 2020 projects.

These networks involve several teams from the Tuberculosis & Infection Biology department, which participate in European integrated projects fighting tuberculosis. This includes projects coordinated by the Tuberculosis Vaccine Initiative, but also involve teams from the Cancer Biology and Structural Biology & Biophysics departments.

Since 2000, the Tuberculosis & Infection Biology department of the IPBS has been part of the TBVAC Consortium. The TBVAC Consortium includes key partners from leading European laboratories, as well as from the United States, Asia, Africa and Australia, Scientists and developers from 40 research partners collaborated in TBVAC2020. The current 4-year project started in January 2015 and is coordinated by the Tuberculosis Vaccine Initiative (TBVI).

Since 2015, IPBS has taken part in various European schemes, such as RESPIRE 2 and 3, and in the Initial Training Network (ITN).

In collaboration with the University of Ljubljana, the IPBS developed a European Associated Laboratory (LEA) entitled Pulsed Electric Fields Applications in Biology and Medicine (LEA EBAM). This French-Slovenian “without walls” laboratory, created in January 2011 for four years, has been renewed for the same duration.

IPBS teams are also members of the interregional (Spain-France-Andorra) POCTEFA 2014–2020 created to promote the sustainable development of the border territories of the three countries on both sides of the Pyrenees.

== The IPBS in numbers ==
The IPBS is mainly supported by direct and indirect finance from the CNRS and the Paul Sabatier University, covering the wages of more than 260 researchers. Other funding sources include the European Union, the Occitanie administrative region, industry, public contracts, charities and other facilities. The average annual budget is €7 million (US$1,182,700). From 1996 to 2023, the institute has produced more than 2500 publications, 80 European and international contracts, more than 400 thesis supported by students and 9 incubated startups.

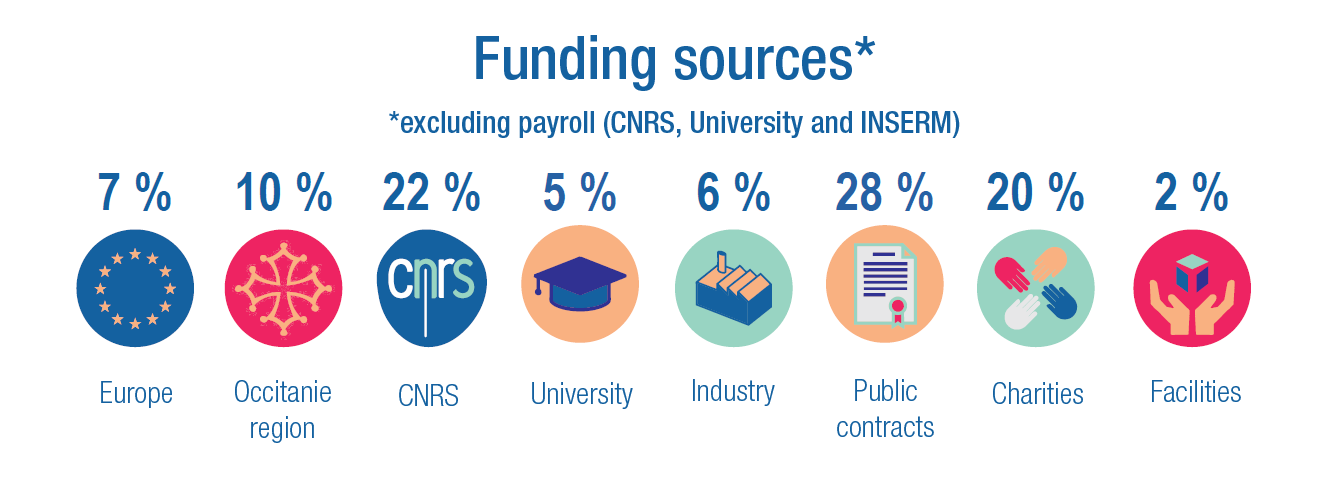
Funding sources of the IPBS

== See also ==
- French National Center for Scientific Research
- Université Toulouse III-Paul Sabatier
