= Pierre Monsan =

French biochemist and entrepreneur (born 1948)

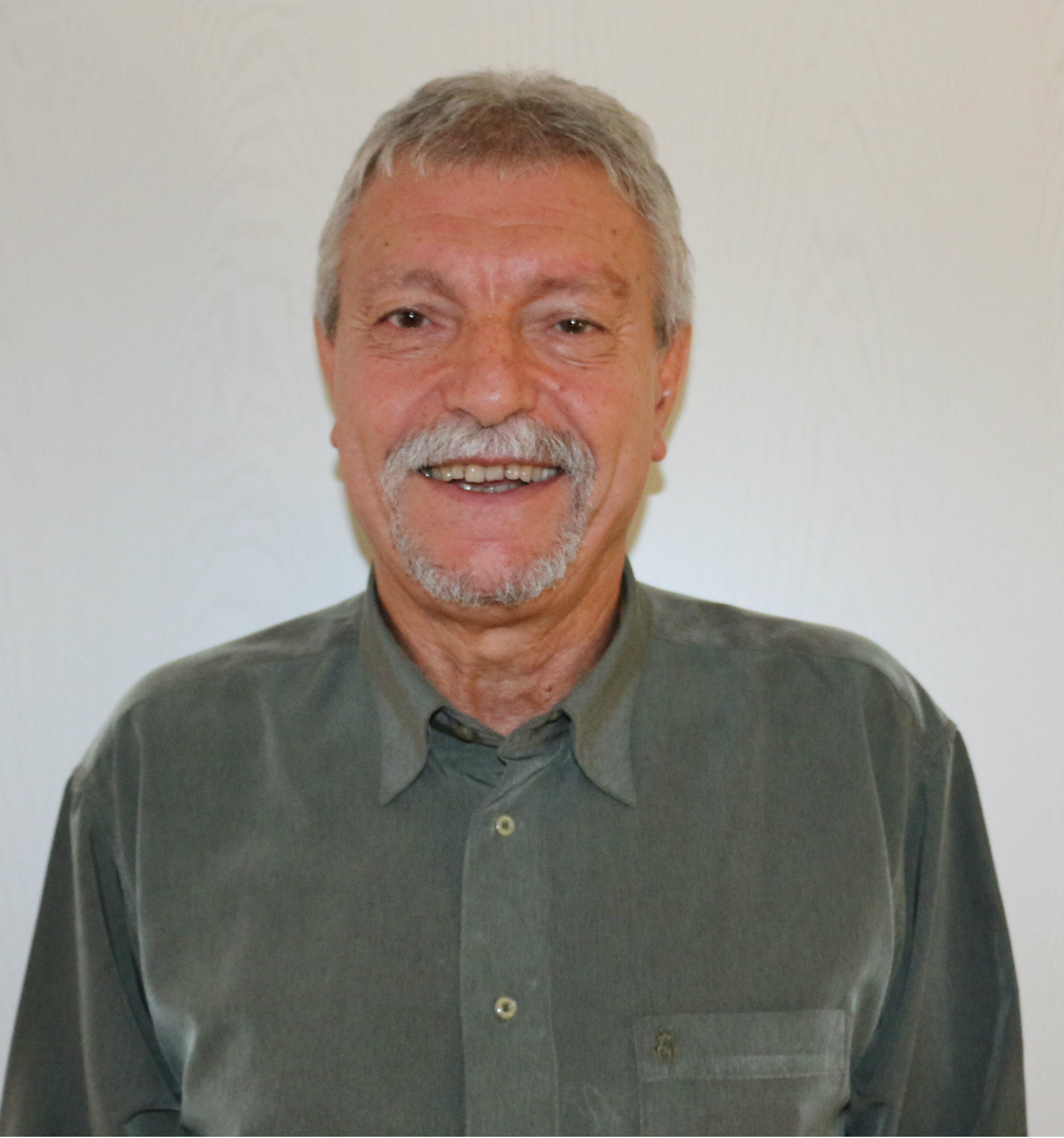
- Born: 25 June 1948 (age 78); Prades, Pyrénées-Orientales, France
- Education: INSA Toulouse; University of Toulouse
- Known for: Biocatalysis; Enzyme engineering Industrial biotechnology
- Awards: Enzyme Engineering (2017); Knight in the French Legion of Honour (2017); Knight in the French National Order of Merit (2013); Biocat Lifetime Achievement (2012); Chaptal Award for Chemical Arts (2000)
- Scientific career
- Fields: Biochemistry, enzymology, biocatalysis, biotechnology
- Workplaces: Institut national des sciences appliquées de Toulouse; University of Toulouse; Laboratoire d'Ingénierie des Systèmes Biologiques et des Procédés; Toulouse White Biotechnology

Pierre Monsan (born June 25, 1948, in Prades, Pyrénées-Orientales, France) is a French biochemist and entrepreneur. He is currently Professor emeritus at the Institut national des sciences appliquées de Toulouse (INSA Toulouse, affiliated to the University of Toulouse) and served as founding director of the pre-industrial demonstrator Toulouse White Biotechnology (TWB) until 2019.

Beyond his academic work, Monsan is co-inventor on numerous patents and co-founded several industrial biotechnology companies.

== Education and career ==
Monsan was attended INSA Toulouse and the University of Toulouse where he graduated with an engineer degree (Ingénieur diplômé) in Biological Chemistry in 1969. He was then awarded his Doctor-Engineer Degree in 1971 and his PhD degree in 1977 from INSA Toulouse for research on enzyme immobilization. He served as lecturer in the Department of Biochemical Engineering at INSA Toulouse from 1969 and was later promoted to Assistant Professor (1973) and then Professor (1981).

In 1984, Monsan took a leave from Academia and co-founded BioEurope, a startup company specialized in industrial biocatalysis. There he served as CSO from 1984 to 1989, CEO from 1989 to 1993 and CSO again from 1993 to 1999 after the acquisition of the company by the Solabia Group. In 1993, Monsan returned to INSA Toulouse to lead a research group focusing on the discovery, characterisation and molecular engineering of enzymes, including glucansucrases and lipases. He was also appointed Professor at Ecole des Mines-ParisTech in 1993. From 1999 to 2003 he served as head of Department of Biochemical Engineering at INSA Toulouse. In 2012, he founded the pre-industrial demonstrator "Toulouse White Biotechnology" (TWB) with a €20M grant within the framework of the Investing for the Future national program (also called the grand emprunt) and served as its founding director until 2019.

Monsan is presently Professor emeritus at INSA Toulouse. From 2019 to 2024, he was the CEO of Cell-Easy, a contract development and manufacturing organization specializing in the production of stem cells.

== Scientific work ==
Research by Monsan and his collaborators has focused on biocatalysis, biochemical engineering and enzyme engineering, published in over 230 articles. These include investigation of structure-activity relationships of enzymes, (particularly glycoside hydrolases and lipases), and enzyme discovery by functional metagenomics. His applied research involves biocatalysis in non-conventional (anhydrous) media for the synthesis of chemicals (e.g., chiral resolution to obtain enantiopure compounds), protein engineering (e.g. modification of substrate specificity, enantioselectivity, or thermostability), methods for enzyme immobilization, and bioreactor design and development.

== Technology transfer and entrepreneurship ==
Monsan has been greatly involved in technology transfer throughout his career and is co-inventor of over 60 patents. He has developed several industrial biocatalytic processes for the production of polysaccharides, oligosaccharides and amino acid derivatives. Companies he has co-founded include BioEurope (1984; biocatalytic synthesis of reagents for the food, pharma and nutrition industries; now owned by the Solabia group), Biotrade (1996; waste water treatment) and Genibio (1998, food additives). He is and has been member of the scientific advisory board of several companies, including Danisco Venture, PCAS, or Deinove.

In 2012, Monsan founded the pre-industrial demonstrator Toulouse White Biotechnology (TWB), an original institute dedicated to transfer technology through a consortium of public and industrial partners. TWB promotes industrial biotechnology and biobased economy through collaborative public/private research and development projects (e.g., THANAPLAST project in partnership with Carbios) and the creation of startups such as EnobraQ (development of yeasts able to metabolize CO_{2}) or Pili (production of bacterial ink).

== Awards and memberships ==
- Chaptal Award for Chemical Arts from the French Society for the Promotion of Industry (2000)
- Founding member of the French Academy of Technologies (since 2000)
- Elected senior member of the Institut Universitaire de France (IUF) in 2003 and re-elected in 2008
- Elected member of the Executive Board of the European Federation of Biotechnology (since 2009)
- Biocat Award for lifetime achievement from the University of Hamburg (2012)
- Knight in the French National Order of Merit (2013)
- Docteur Honoris Causa of the University of Liège, Belgium (2015)
- Founding Chairman of the French Federation of Biotechnology (since 2015)
- Foreign member of the College of Fellows of the American Institute for Medical and Biological Engineering (AIMBE) (since 2016)
- Corresponding Member of the French Academy of Agriculture (since 2016)
- Enzyme Engineering Award from Engineering Conferences International and Genencor (2017)
- Knight in the French Legion of Honour (2017)
