= Institut Clément Ader =

French science research laboratory

The Institut Clément Ader (English: Clément Ader Institute) is a research laboratory under the supervision of the Institut national des sciences appliquées de Toulouse (INSA Toulouse), the Toulouse III - Paul Sabatier University (UPS), the École des mines d'Albi-Carmaux (IMT Mines Albi), the Institut supérieur de l'aéronautique et de l'espace (ISAE-SUPAERO) and the National Center for Scientific Research (CNRS).

Created in 2009, it is a joint research unit (UMR CNRS no. 5312) based in Toulouse and with branches in Albi, Tarbes and Figeac.

== History ==
The Institut Clément Ader has been created on June 30, 2009, following the merger of the tools, materials and processes research center of IMT Mines Albi (CROMeP), the mechanical structures and materials department of ISAE-SUPAERO ( DMSM) and the Toulouse mechanical engineering laboratory of INSA Toulouse and UPS (LGMT). Its name refers to Clément Ader, French engineer and aviation pioneer.

Initially recognized as a Host Team (EA no. 814) by the Ministry of Higher Education and Research (MESR) and the High Council for the Evaluation of Research and Higher Education (HCÉRES), it becomes an evolving research training from the CNRS (FRE CNRS no 3687) on January 1, 2015, then a joint research unit from the CNRS (UMR CNRS no 5312) on January 1, 2016. It is located in 3 cities: Toulouse, Tarbes and Albi (IMT Mines Albi).

== Themes and research teams ==
The laboratory's research is in the field of solid mechanics: materials, mechanical engineering, mechanical structures, mechanical systems, processes, measurements, metrology, modeling, durability, machining, etc. It brings together around 90 teacher-researchers, 10 temporary researchers, 30 BIATSS, 115 doctoral students divided into 4 research groups.

== See also ==
- Official website
