= Auclair =

Auclair is a French surname. Notable people with the surname include:

- Adam Auclair (born 1996), Canadian professional football linebacker
- Antony Auclair (born 1993), Canadian former professional gridiron football tight end
- Jean Auclair (born 1946), French politician
- Jeanne Auclair (1924–2026), Canadian multidisciplinary artist
- Josée Auclair (born 1962), Canadian explorer
- JP Auclair (1977–2014), Canadian freestyle skier
- Karine Auclair, Canadian professor of chemistry at McGill University in Montréal
- Marcelle Auclair (1899–1983), French novelist, biographer, and journalist
- Michel Auclair (1922–1988), French actor
- Michèle Auclair (1924–2005), French violinist
- Vincent Auclair (born 1965), Canadian politician

== See also ==
- Auclair, Quebec, a municipality in Canada
- Hubertine Auclert (1848–1914), a French suffragist
