= University of Toulouse =

French university in Toulouse

Coordinates: 43°36′16″N 1°26′38″E

- Université de Toulouse (French)
- Motto: Les sciences au cœur
- Motto in English: Science at its core
- Type: Public
- Established: 1229; 797 years ago
- Academic affiliations: Toulouse University System
- Budget: €430 million
- President: Odile Rauzy
- Academic staff: 2,509
- Total staff: 4,300
- Students: 37,000
- Location: Toulouse, Occitanie, France
- Campus: 652 acres (264 ha); Urban
- Language: French
- Website: www.univ-toulouse.fr

The University of Toulouse (Note: (French: Université de Toulouse, pronounced [ynivɛʁsite də tuluz]; Occitan: Universitat de Tolosa)) is a public research university, based in Toulouse, France. Originally established in 1229, it was one of the earliest universities to emerge in Europe. Suppressed during the French Revolution in 1793, it was refounded in 1896 as part of the reorganization of higher education. It was abolished in 1969, giving birth to the three universities: Toulouse Capitole University, University of Toulouse-Jean Jaurès and Paul Sabatier University. On 1 January 2023, the Toulouse university system adopted the name of Université de Toulouse, and on 1 January 2025, Paul Sabatier University also adopted the name.

In particular, the University of Toulouse is the leader of the university system with which it is associated, along with the Toulouse Capitole University and the University of Toulouse-Jean Jaurès. This development, strongly desired by the elected officials of the Occitania region and Toulouse Métropole, aims to give greater visibility to Toulouse higher education in international rankings.

== History ==
=== Origins ===
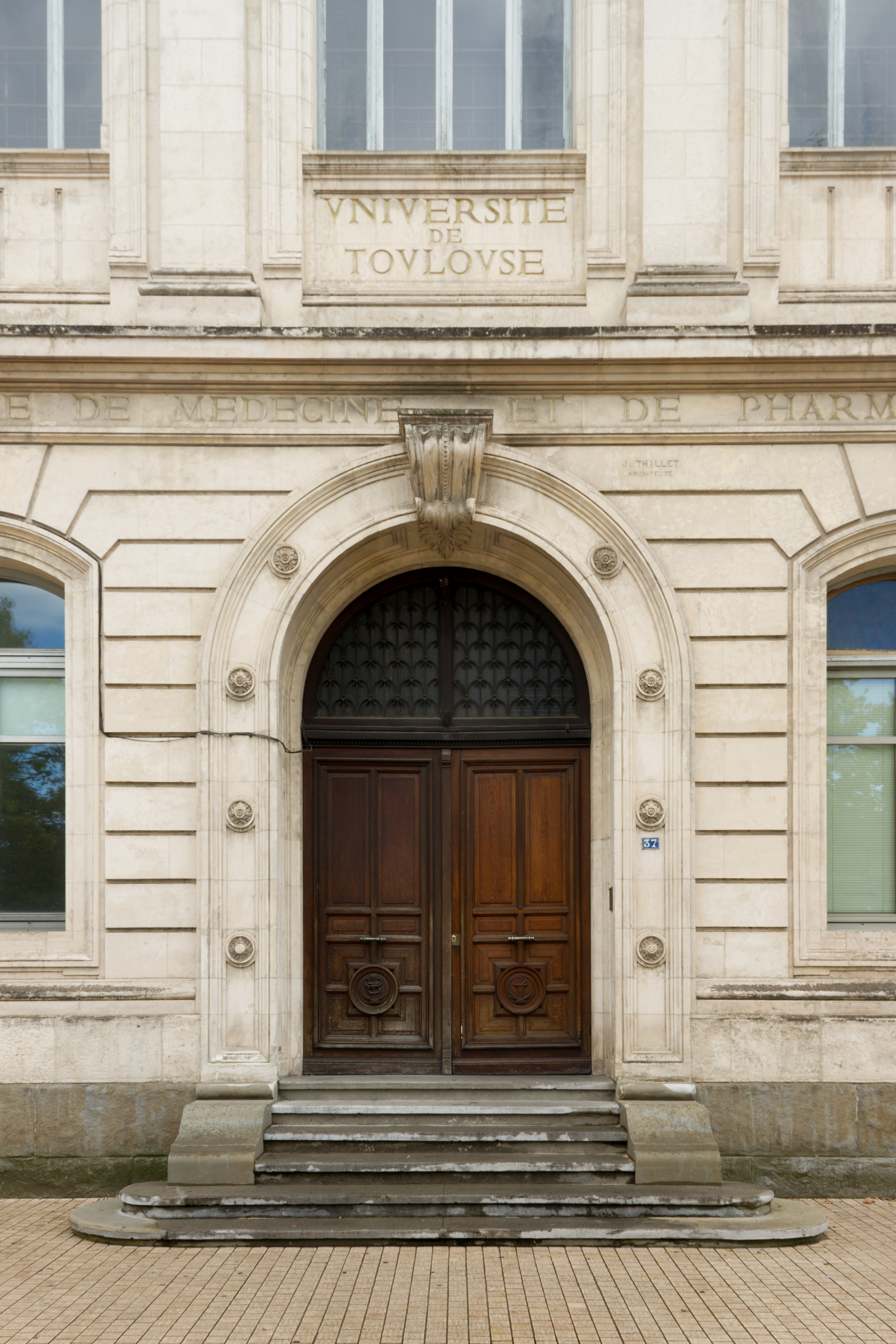
Entrance to the Department of Medicine, Faculty of Health, University of Toulouse, 2017.

The formation of the University of Toulouse was imposed on Count Raymond VII as a part of the Treaty of Paris in 1229, ending the crusade against the Albigensians. As he was suspected of sympathizing with the heretics, Raymond VII had to finance the teaching of theology. Bishop Foulques de Toulouse was among the founders of the university. Among its first lecturers were Jean de Garlande and Roland of Cremona. Other faculties (law, medicine) were added later. Initially, the university was located in the center of the city, together with the ancestors of student residences, the colleges.

=== Split of the University of Toulouse ===
In 1969, the University of Toulouse split into three separate universities and numerous specialised institutions of higher education. The three universities are: Toulouse 1 Capitole University, University of Toulouse-Jean Jaurès, and Toulouse III - Paul Sabatier University.

=== Attempts at refoundation, with the university system ===
The university system was founded on 27 March 2007. It no longer represented a single university; it was the collective entity (PRES) which federated the universities and institutions of higher education in the Toulouse region. With more than 100,000 students, Midi-Pyrénées is the fifth-largest university area in France.The current university system was created as a ComUE according to the 2013 Law on Higher Education and Research (France), effective on 1 July 2015. It replaced the pôle de recherche et d'enseignement supérieur (PRES), which had been organized in 2007 to coordinate higher education and research in the region.

In 2021, Patrick Lévy conducted an audit of the university site, which proposed changes. In 2022, this process led to the evolution of the institution towards the status of an experimental ComUE. On 1 January 2023, the Federal University of Toulouse Midi-Pyrénées became the University of Toulouse.

=== 2025: refoundation of the University of Toulouse ===
On 1 January 2025, the Université de Toulouse university system became the Communauté d'universités et établissements de Toulouse when the Toulouse-III - Paul Sabatier University adopted the name Université de Toulouse. The experimental public institution Université de Toulouse is created to replace the Toulouse III - Paul Sabatier University, with the Purpan Engineering School as a graduate school.

== Research ==
The following list is not exhaustive.

- Mathematics
  - Plasma and energy conversion laboratory (LAPLACE)
- Space, astrophysics, aeronautics
  - Toulouse Space Center
  - Higher Institute of Aeronautics and Space (ISAE SUPAERO)
  - National School of Civil Aviation (ENAC)
  - ISSAT,
  - Aerospace Valley
- Computer science and electronics
  - Toulouse Institute for Computer Science Research (IRIT)
- Biology, geoscience, earth sciences, climate
  - Institute of Pharmacology and Structural Biology
- Health
- Chemistry
- Materials
  - Centre for Materials Elaboration and Structural Studies (CEMES)

== University rankings ==
- Shanghai ranking (2022)
  - Overall ranking : 201-300
  - Best Ranked Subjects
    - Remote Sensing : 7
    - Oceanography : 17
    - Earth Sciences : 28
    - Ecology : 37
    - Mathematics : 51-75
    - Atmospheric Science : 51-75
    - Water Resources : 51-75
    - Mining & Mineral Engineering : 51-75
- QS (2020)
  - Overall ranking : 511-520

== Major fields of study ==
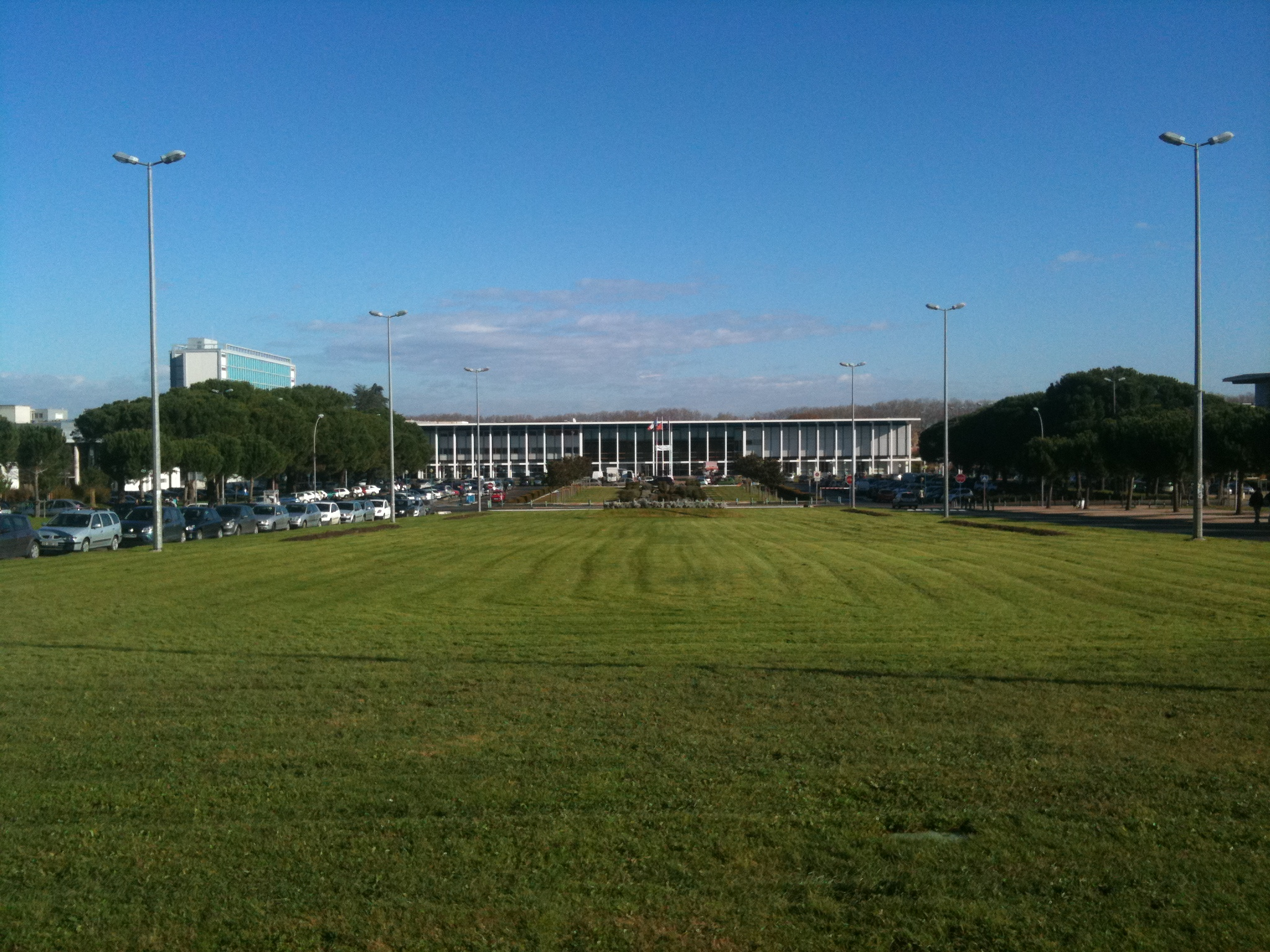
Administration building located at the entrance of the university

The University of Toulouse provides a diverse array of academic programs, encompassing licence (bachelor's), master's, and doctoral degrees across a wide spectrum of disciplines, such as science, engineering, health sciences, and sports-related fields.

== Faculty ==
- Paul Sabatier, (chemist) (1854–1941), Dean of the Faculty of Science at the University of Toulouse in 1905. Nobel Prize in Chemistry jointly with fellow Frenchman Victor Grignard in 1912.
- Adrianus Turnebus, (1512 – 12 June 1565), classical scholar.
- Pierre Laromiguière, (3 November 1756 – 12 August 1837), philosopher.
- Jean Jaurès, (3 September 1859 – 31 July 1914), politician.
- Paul Fauconnet, (1874–1938), sociologist.
- Raymond Aron, (14 March 1905, Paris – 17 October 1983) philosopher, sociologist and political scientist.

== Notable alumni ==
- Étienne Dolet (1509–1546), French scholar, translator and printer.
- Michael Servetus (1511–1553), Spanish theologian and physician.
- Michel de Montaigne (1533–1592), French philosopher and moralist.
- Vincent de Paul (1581–1660), French Catholic priest.
- Henry de Puyjalon (1841–1905), French/Canadian pioneer in biology and ecology.
- Selman Riza (5 February 1872 – 5 October 1931), linguist and politician.
- Mustafa Kamil Pasha (1874–1908), Egyptian lawyer, journalist, activist, and nationalist leader.
- Armand Praviel (1875–1944, Doctor of Law 1901), French writer and journalist.
- Marthe Condat (1886-1939), first women to pass the medical Agrégation and receive a professorship.
- Marcel Dassault (1892–1986, graduated in 1913 from ISAE), French aircraft industrialist. He founded the company Dassault Aviation.
- Henri Koch-Kent (1905–1999), Luxemburger anti-fascist activist, author, historian
- François Hussenot (1912–1951, graduated in 1935 from ISAE aeronautical engineer credited with the invention of one of the early forms of the flight data recorder.
- Saeed Abu Ali (born 1955), Palestinian politician and Assistant Secretary-General of the League of Arab Nations.
- Jean Castex (born 25 June 1965), French Prime Minister, from 3 July 2020 to 16 May 2022.
- Thomas Pesquet (born in 1978, graduated in 2001 from ISAE), European Space Agency astronaut.
- Thomas Castaignède (born 1975, graduated from INSA Toulouse), rugby union footballer, played with the France national team
- Romain Mesnil (born 1977, graduated in 2001 from INSA Toulouse), French Pole vaulter
- Jean Bouilhou (born 1978, graduated in 2002 from INSA Toulouse), rugby union footballer, played with the France national team
- David Skrela (born 1979, graduated in 2003 from INSA Toulouse), rugby union footballer, played with the France national team

== See also ==
- List of medieval universities
- Pôle de recherche et d'enseignement supérieur
- List of split up universities
