= Adrian Bejan =

Romanian-American professor

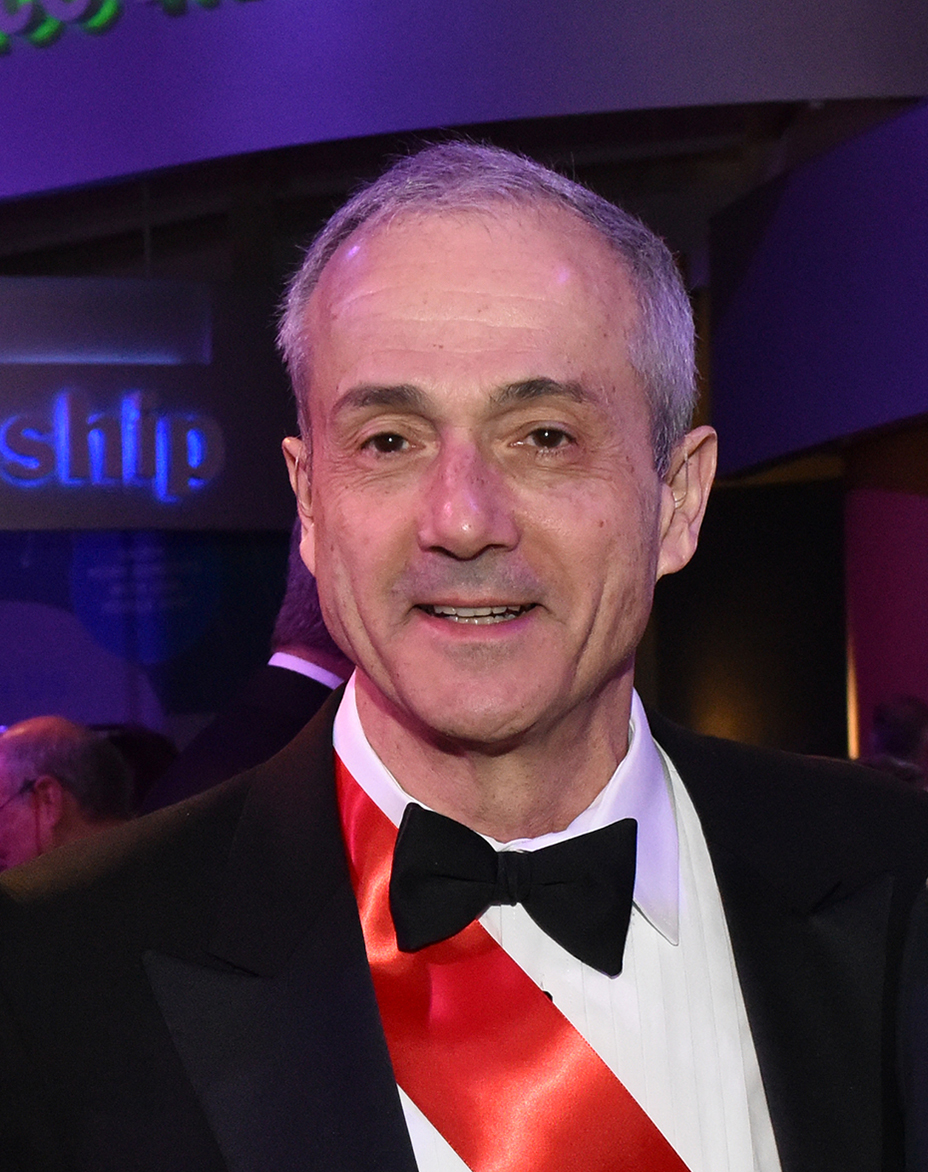
- Franklin Institute 2018
- Born: 1948 (age 77–78); Galaţi, Romania
- Education: MIT (1971, 1972, 1975)
- Occupation: Distinguished Professor at Duke University
- Known for: Evolution, as Physics; Constructal Law; Design in Nature; Thermodynamics; Heat transfer
- Awards: Worcester Reed Warner Medal (1996); ASME Thurston Lecture Award (1999); Max Jakob Memorial Award (1999); Benjamin Franklin Medal (2018); Humboldt Research Award (2019)

Adrian Bejan is a Romanian-American professor who has made contributions to modern thermodynamics and developed the constructal law. He is J. A. Jones Distinguished Professor of Mechanical Engineering at Duke University and author of the books Design in Nature, The Physics of Life , Freedom and Evolution and Time And Beauty. He is an Honorary Member of the American Society of Mechanical Engineers and was awarded the Benjamin Franklin Medal and the ASME Medal.

== Early life and education ==
Bejan was born in Galaţi, a city on the Danube in Romania. His mother, Marioara Bejan (1914–1998), was a pharmacist. His father, Dr. Anghel Bejan (1910–1976), was a veterinarian. Bejan showed an early talent in drawing, and his parents enrolled him in art school. He also excelled in basketball, which earned him a position on the Romanian national basketball team.

At age 19 Bejan won a scholarship to the United States and entered Massachusetts Institute of Technology in Cambridge, Massachusetts. In 1972 he was awarded BS and MS degrees as a member of the Honors Course in Mechanical Engineering. He graduated in 1975 with a PhD from MIT a thesis titled "Improved thermal design of the cryogenic cooling system for a superconducting synchronous generator". His advisor was Joseph L. Smith Jr., a disciple of Prof. Joseph H. Keenan.

== Career ==
From 1976 to 1978 Bejan was a Miller research fellow in at the University of California Berkeley working with Chang-Lin Tien. In 1978 he moved to Colorado and joined the faculty of the Department of Mechanical Engineering at the University of Colorado in Boulder. In 1982 Bejan published his first book, Entropy Generation Through Heat and Fluid Flow. The book is aimed at practical applications of the second law of thermodynamics, and presented his ideas on irreversibility, availability and exergy analysis in a form for engineers. In 1984 he published the first edition of Convection Heat Transfer'. In an era when researchers did heat transfer calculations using numerical methods on supercomputers, the book emphasized new research methods such as intersection of asymptotes, heatlines, and scale analysis to solve problems.

Bejan was appointed full professor at Duke University in 1984. In 1988 he published the first edition of his textbook Advanced Engineering Thermodynamics. The book combined thermodynamics theory with engineering heat transfer and fluid mechanics, and introduced entropy generation minimization as a method of optimization. In 1996 the ASME awarded him the Worcester Reed Warner Medal for "originality, challenges to orthodoxy, and impact on thermodynamics and heat transfer, which were made through his first three books".

In 1989 Bejan was appointed the J. A. Jones Distinguished Professor of Mechanical Engineering. In 1988 and 1989, his peers named two dimensionless groups Bejan number (Be), in two different fields: for the pressure difference group, in heat transfer by forced convection, and for the dimensionless ratio of fluid friction irreversibility divided by heat transfer irreversibility, in thermodynamics. From 1992 to 1996 he published four more books, Convection in Porous Media, Heat Transfer, Thermal Design and Optimization and Entropy Generation Minimization.

== Constructal law ==
In 1995 while reviewing entropy generation minimization for a symposium paper and writing another paper on the cooling of electronic components, Bejan formulated the constructal law. The constructal law is an organizing design principle by which natural phenomena as well as human designed systems will evolve in a way that facilitates the flow of energy and material passing through it. As an example, for electronic components too small for convective cooling, they must be designed for efficient conduction. The 1995 paper provides a method for efficiently designing conductive paths, from smaller paths leading to larger ones. The similarity of the solution to the branching structures seen in multiple inanimate and living things led to his statement of what he calls a new law of nature: "For a finite-size system to persist in time (to live), it must evolve in such a way that it provides easier access to the imposed (global) currents that flow through it." To emphasize the coming together of paths he called the theory constructal from the Latin verb "to construct", the opposite time direction of fractal from the Latin "to break".

Bejan incorporated his constructal law into the second edition of his textbook, Advanced Engineering Thermodynamics (1997). He continued thermodynamics and its constructal law and implications. In 2004, he published Porous and Complex Flow Structures in Modern Technologies. The same year, he and Sylvie Lorente were awarded the Edward F. Obert Award by the ASME for their paper "Thermodynamic Formulation of the Constructal Law" In 2008 he published Design with Constructal Theory.

=== Awards for Thermodynamics and Design in Nature ===
In 1999 the American Society of Mechanical Engineers presented him with the Robert Henry Thurston Lecture Award and in 2011 with an honorary membership. He was cited for "an extraordinary record of creative work, including the unification of thermodynamics and heat transfer; the conceptual development of design as a science that unites all fields; legendary contributions to engineering education; and, since 1996, the discovery and continued development of the constructal law."

Bejan has also written books for the general audience. In 2012 he published Design in Nature: How the Constructal Law Governs Evolution in Biology, Technology, and Social Organization and in 2016 The Physics of Life: The Evolution of Everything. Bejan's books for the general audience continued with Freedom and Evolution, Hierarchy in Nature, Society and Science (2020), and Time and Beauty, Why Time Flies and Beauty Never Dies (2022). He credits these books for his award of the Ralph Coats Roe Medal from the ASME in 2017. He was cited for "permanent contributions to the public appreciation of the pivotal role of engineering in an advanced society through outstanding accomplishments as an engineering scientist and educator, renowned communicator and prolific writer".

In November 2017 the Franklin Institute of Philadelphia announced that Bejan would be awarded the 2018 Benjamin Franklin Medal in Mechanical Engineering. He was cited for "his pioneering interdisciplinary contributions in thermodynamics and convection heat transfer that have improved the performance of engineering systems, and for constructal theory, which predicts natural design and its evolution in engineering, scientific, and social systems."

On 27 June 2019, in Berlin, the Humboldt Foundation awarded Bejan the Humboldt Research Award for lifetime achievement. He was cited for "his pioneering contributions to modern thermodynamics and "Constructal Law" – a law of physics that predicts natural design and its evolution in biology, geophysics, climate change, technology, social organization, evolutionary design and development, wealth and sustainability".

On 30 December 2019, in Ankara, the Turkish Academy of Sciences (TÜBA) awarded Bejan the TÜBA International Academy Prize in the category of Basic and Engineering Sciences "for his remarkable number of creative works such as combining thermodynamics and heat transfer in the field of thermodynamics, developing design as a science that brings together all fields, and putting forth "Constructal Theory".

On 20 February 2020, in Durham, the French government awarded Bejan the title of Knight of the French Order of Academic Palms.

On 18 July 2021, the International Association for Green Energy (IAGE) gave Bejan the IAGE Lifetime Achievement Award “For revolutionary contributions to thermal sciences through entropy generation minimization and the original development of a new law in physics, the constructal law, for predicting natural design and its evolution as climate, social ecosystems, and sustainability.”

In September 2023, peers from many countries reviewed Bejan's scholarly legacy on the occasion of his 75th birthday.

In April 2024, Duke University honored Bejan for excellence in teaching and research.

On 26 August 2024, Adrian Bejan was named the 2024 recipient of The American Society of Mechanical Engineers (ASME) Medal. The award, established in 1920, is the highest award that the Society can bestow and recognizes eminently distinguished engineering achievement. Bejan is honored for “unprecedented creativity, breadth, and permanent impact on engineering; for developments in the new science of energy, motion, form, and evolution; and for building bridges to design in biological, geophysical, and sociological systems. Bejan is credited with several groundbreaking developments. He unified thermodynamics with heat transfer, fluid dynamics, and the science of form (i.e., flow configuration, image, design), as a counterweight to the doctrine of reductionism; discovered, taught, and applied the Constructal Law of evolution in nature; and brought together biologists, physicists, engineers, sociologists, philosophers, economists, managers, and athletes with creative books for the public, including Design in Nature (2012), The Physics of Life (2016), Freedom and Evolution (2020), and Time and Beauty (2022). His influential work and prolific publication record have earned him 18 honorary doctorates from 11 countries. He holds a position among the top 0.01% of most-cited and impactful scientists, is the sixth most impactful scholar in mechanical engineering worldwide, and the 11th across all engineering disciplines, according to the citations impact database in PLOS Biology.”

At a public ceremony on 9 October 2024 in Bucharest, the Romanian Basketball Federation conferred upon Prof. Bejan the Title of Excellence: "For promoting the role of sport in achieving excellence in academia, and his remarkable contributions to combining science and sport, embodying in his career as physicist and basketball player an exceptional synergy between the laws of physics and the dynamics of sport. Through his innovative studies and the applicability of constructal theory in the field of movement, he opened new horizons for understanding and optimizing performance in sport in general, and in basketball in particular. The Romanian Basketball Federation recognizes his academic excellence and the impact he had on the evolution of basketball from a scientific and educational perspective."

In Paris, on 12 October 2016, Adrian Bejan received the Prigogine Medal at the Théatre du Vieux Colombier, the stage of the Comédie-Française across from Saint Germain des Prés.

== Selected awards and honors ==
Bejan has received multiple awards and honorary degrees.

- Ralph Coats Roe Award, American Society of Engineering Education (ASEE), 2000
- Benjamin Franklin Medal, Franklin Institute, 2018
- Turkish Academy of Sciences Prize (2019)

== Selected publications ==
Articles

- Bejan, Adrian (1977). "The Concept of Irreversibility in Heat Exchanger Design: Counterflow Heat Exchangers for Gas-to-Gas Applications". Journal of Heat Transfer. 99 (3): 374–380. doi:10.1115/1.3450705. ISSN 0022-1481.
- Bejan, Adrian (1979). "A Study of Entropy Generation in Fundamental Convective Heat Transfer". Journal of Heat Transfer. 101 (4): 718–725. doi:10.1115/1.3451063. ISSN 0022-1481.
- Bejan, Adrian "Entropy Generation Minimization: The New Thermodynamics of Finite-Size Devices and Finite-Time Processes," Journal of Applied Physics, Vol. 79, 1 February 1996, pp. 1191–1218.
- Bejan, Adrian (1997). "Constructal-theory network of conducting paths for cooling a heat generating volume". International Journal of Heat and Mass Transfer. 40 (4): 799–816. Bibcode:1997IJHMT..4099813B. doi:10.1016/0017-9310(96)00175-5. ISSN 0017-9310.
- Bejan, Adrian; Lorente, Sylvie (2004). "The constructal law and the thermodynamics of flow systems with configuration". International Journal of Heat and Mass Transfer. 47 (14–16): 3203–3214. Bibcode:2004IJHMT..47.3203B. doi:10.1016/j.ijheatmasstransfer.2004.02.007. ISSN 0017-9310.
- Bejan, Adrian; Marden, James H. (2006). "Unifying constructal theory for scale effects in running, swimming and flying". Journal of Experimental Biology. 209 (2): 238–248. Bibcode:2006JExpB.209..238B. doi:10.1242/jeb.01974. PMID 16391346. S2CID 17376053.
- Bejan, Adrian (2017). "Evolution in thermodynamics". Applied Physics Reviews. 4 (1): 011305. Bibcode:2017ApPRv...4a1305B. doi:10.1063/1.4978611. ISSN 1931-9401.
- A. Bejan, U. Gunes and B. Sahin, University Rankings: Quality, Size and Permanence, European Review, Vol. 28, 2020, pp. 537-558. doi: 10.1017/S106279872000006X
- A. Bejan, Perfection is the enemy of evolution, BioSystems, Vol. 229, 2023, 104917. doi: 10.1016/j.biosystems.2023.104917
- A. Bejan, The principle underlying all evolution, biological, geophysical, social and technological, Philosophical Transactions A, Vol. 381, 2023, 20220288. doi: 10.1098/rsta.2022.0288
- A. Bejan, Vascular flow design and predicting evolution, International Journal of Heat and Mass Transfer, Vol. 155, 2024, 107517. doi: 10.1016/j.icheatmasstransfer.2024.107517
- A. Bejan, H. Almahmoud, U. Gunes, H.E. Fakhari and P. Mardanpour, Evolution and irreversibility: Two distinct phenomena and their distinct laws of nature, Physics of Life Reviews, Vol. 50, 2024, pp.103-116. doi: 10.1016/j.plrev.2024.06.014
- A. Bejan, The Physics of the Urge to Have Freedom, BioSystems, Vol. 243, 2024, 105277. doi: 10.1016/j.biosystems.2024.105277
- A. Bejan, Energy store & release facilitating movement in stick & slip friction, animal jump, and earthquake, Scientific Reports, Vol. 14, 2024, 18832. doi: 10.1038/s41598-024-68525-1
- A. Bejan, Water cataracts and the “shortest-time descent” curve (Brachistochrone) as one natural phenomenon, AIP Advances, 15, 025309 (2025) https://doi.org/10.1063/5.0253849
- A. Bejan and P. Mardanpour, Why people shape roofs the same way, International Communications in Heat and Mass Transfer, Vol. 164, Part B, May 2025, 108909.
- A. Bejan, Obesity, body heat loss, and efficiency in movement, BioSystems, Vol. 259, 2026, 105673. doi: 10.1016/j.biosystems.2025.105673
- A. Bejan, Shaken, not stirred, mixing evolves to order, BioSystems, Vol. 262, 2026, 105730. doi: 10.1016/j.biosystems.2026.105730
- A. Bejan, Advice to the Aspiring Scientist, Journal of the Franklin Institute, Vol. 363(15), 2026, p.109018. doi: 10.1016/j.jfranklin.2026.109018
- A. Bejan, The Engineer, the Creator, The Mid-Century Creativity Reader. Eds Gerard J. Puccio et al., Oxford University Press, 2026. doi: 10.1093/oso/9780197834305.003.0035

Books

- Bejan, Adrian (1982). Entropy Generation Through Heat and Fluid Flow. Wiley. ISBN 978-0-471-09438-8.
- Bejan, Adrian (1984). Convection Heat Transfer. Wiley. ISBN 978-0-471-89612-8., updated in 1995, 2004, and 2013: Bejan, Adrian (2013). Convection Heat Transfer (4th ed.). Wiley. ISBN 978-0-470-90037-6.
- Bejan, Adrian (1988). Advanced Engineering Thermodynamics. Wiley. ISBN 978-0-471-62241-3., updated in 1997, 2006, and 2016:
- Bejan, Adrian (2000). Shape and Structure, from Engineering to Nature (1 ed.). Cambridge University Press. ISBN 9780521793889.
- Bejan, Adrian (2016). Advanced Engineering Thermodynamics (4th ed.). Wiley. ISBN 978-1-119-05209-8.
- Nield, Donald A.; Adrian Bejan (1992). Convection in Porous Media. Springer. ISBN 978-0387976518. OCLC 817768465., updated in 1999, 2006, 2017: Nield, Donald A.; Adrian Bejan (2017). Convection in Porous Media (5th ed.). Springer. ISBN 978-3-319-49562-0.
- Bejan, Adrian (1993). Heat Transfer. Wiley. ISBN 978-0-471-50290-6.
- Bejan, Adrian (1995). Entropy Generation Minimization: The Method of Thermodynamic Optimization of Finite-Size Systems and Finite-Time Processes. CRC Press. ISBN 978-0-8493-9651-9.
- Bejan, Adrian; George Tsatsaronis; Michael J. Moran (1996). Thermal Design and Optimization. Wiley. ISBN 978-0-471-58467-4.
- Bejan, Adrian (2004). Porous and Complex Flow Structures in Modern Technologies. Springer. ISBN 978-0-387-20225-9.
- Bejan, Adrian; Lorente, Sylvie (2008). Design with Constructal Theory. Wiley. ISBN 978-0-471-99816-7.
- Bejan, Adrian; J. Peder Zane (2012). Design in Nature: How the Constructal Law Governs Evolution in Biology, Physics, Technology, and Social Organizations. Doubleday. ISBN 978-0-385-53461-1.
- Bejan, Adrian (2016). The Physics of Life: The Evolution of Everything. St. Martin's Press. ISBN 978-1-250-07882-7.
- Bejan, Adrian (2020). Freedom and Evolution: Hierarchy in Nature, Society and Science. New York: Springer. ISBN 978-3-030-34008-7.
- Bejan, Adrian (2022). Time And Beauty: Why Time Flies And Beauty Never Dies. World Scientific. ISBN 978-9811246791.
- Bejan, Adrian (2022). Heat Transfer: Evolution, Design and Performance. Wiley. ISBN 978-1-119-46743-4.
- Bejan, Adrian (2026). Diversity through Freedom. New York: Springer. ISBN 973-3-032-05264-3
