= Bejan number =

Dimensionless number in fluid dynamics

There are two different Bejan numbers (Be) used in the scientific domains of thermodynamics and fluid mechanics. Bejan numbers are named after Adrian Bejan.

== Thermodynamics ==
In the field of thermodynamics the Bejan number is the ratio of heat transfer irreversibility to total irreversibility due to heat transfer and fluid friction:

$$\mathrm{Be} = \frac{\dot S'_{\mathrm{gen},\, \Delta T}}{\dot S'_{\mathrm{gen},\, \Delta T}+ \dot S'_{\mathrm{gen},\, \Delta p}}$$

where

$\dot S'_{\mathrm{gen},\, \Delta T}$ is the entropy generation contributed by heat transfer
$\dot S'_{\mathrm{gen},\, \Delta p}$ is the entropy generation contributed by fluid friction.

Schiubba has also achieved the relation between Bejan number Be and Brinkman number Br

$$\mathrm{Be} = \frac{\dot S'_{\mathrm{gen},\, \Delta T}}{\dot S'_{\mathrm{gen},\, \Delta T}+ \dot S'_{\mathrm{gen},\, \Delta p}}= \frac{1}{1+\mathrm{Br}}$$

== Heat transfer and mass transfer ==
In the context of heat transfer. the Bejan number is the dimensionless pressure drop along a channel of length $L$:

$$\mathrm{Be} = \frac{\Delta p \, L^2} {\mu \alpha}$$

where

$\mu$ is the dynamic viscosity
$\alpha$ is the thermal diffusivity

The Be number plays in forced convection the same role that the Rayleigh number plays in natural convection.

In the context of mass transfer. the Bejan number is the dimensionless pressure drop along a channel of length $L$:

$$\mathrm{Be} = \frac{\Delta p \, L^2} {\mu D}$$

where

$\mu$ is the dynamic viscosity
$D$ is the mass diffusivity

For the case of Reynolds analogy (Le = Pr = Sc = 1), it is clear that all three definitions of Bejan number are the same.

Also, Awad and Lage: obtained a modified form of the Bejan number, originally proposed by Bhattacharjee and Grosshandler for momentum processes, by replacing the dynamic viscosity appearing in the original proposition with the equivalent product of the fluid density and the momentum diffusivity of the fluid. This modified form is not only more akin to the physics it represents but it also has the advantage of being dependent on only one viscosity coefficient. Moreover, this simple modification allows for a much simpler extension of Bejan number to other diffusion processes, such as a heat or a species transfer process, by simply replacing the diffusivity coefficient. Consequently, a general Bejan number representation for any process involving pressure-drop and diffusion becomes possible. It is shown that this general representation yields analogous results for any process satisfying the Reynolds analogy (i.e., when Pr = Sc = 1), in which case the momentum, energy, and species concentration representations of Bejan number turn out to be the same.

Therefore, it would be more natural and broad to define Be in general, simply as:

$$\mathrm{Be} = \frac{\Delta p \, L^2} {\rho \delta^2}$$

where

$\rho$ is the fluid density
$\delta$ is the corresponding diffusivity of the process in consideration.

In addition, Awad: presented Hagen number vs. Bejan number. Although their physical meaning is not the same because the former represents the dimensionless pressure gradient while the latter represents the dimensionless pressure drop, it will be shown that Hagen number coincides with Bejan number in cases where the characteristic length (l) is equal to the flow length (L).

== Fluid mechanics ==
In the field of fluid mechanics the Bejan number is identical to the one defined in heat transfer problems, being the dimensionless pressure drop along the fluid path length $L$ in both external flows and internal flows:

$$\mathrm{Be_L} = \frac{\Delta p \, L^2} {\mu \nu}$$

where

$\mu$ is the dynamic viscosity
$\nu$ is the momentum diffusivity (or Kinematic viscosity).

A further expression of Bejan number in the Hagen–Poiseuille flow will be introduced by Awad. This expression is

$$\mathrm{Be} = {{32 \mathrm{Re} L^3} \over {d^3}}$$

where

$\mathrm{Re}$ is the Reynolds number
$L$ is the flow length
$d$ is the pipe diameter

The above expression shows that the Bejan number in the Hagen–Poiseuille flow is indeed a dimensionless group, not recognized previously.

The Bhattacharjee and Grosshandler formulation of the Bejan number has large importance on fluid dynamics in the case of the fluid flow over a horizontal plane because it is directly related to fluid dynamic drag D by the following expression of drag force

$D = \Delta p \, A_w = \frac{1}{2} C_D A_f \frac {\nu \mu}{L^2}Re^2$

which allows expressing the drag coefficient $C_D$ as a function of Bejan number and the ratio between wet area $A_w$ and front area $A_f$:

$C_D = 2 \frac{A_w}{A_f}\frac{Be}{Re_L^2}$

where $Re_L$ is the Reynolds Number related to fluid path length L. This expression has been verified experimentally in a wind tunnel.

This equation represents the drag coefficient in terms of second law of thermodynamics:

$C_D = \frac{2T_0 \dot S'gen}{A_f \rho u^3}=\frac{2 \dot X'}{A_f \rho u^3}$

where $\dot S'gen$ is entropy generation rate and $\dot X'$ is exergy dissipation rate and ρ is density.

The above formulation allows expressing Bejan number in terms of second law of thermodynamics:

$Be_L = \frac{1}{A_w \rho u} \frac{L^2}{\nu ^2} \Delta \dot X' = \frac{1}{A_w \rho u} \frac{T_0 L^2}{\nu ^2} \Delta \dot S'$

This expression is a fundamental step toward a representation of fluid dynamic problems in terms of the second law of thermodynamics.

== See also ==
- Adrian Bejan
- Entropy
- Exergy
- Thermodynamics
- Constructal theory
