= Karine Auclair =

Canadian chemist

- Born: Jonquière, Québec, Canada
- Education: BSc, Chemistry, Université du Québec à Chicoutimi; PhD, University of Alberta
- Scientific career
- Institutions: McGill University
- Thesis: Biosynthetic studies on the polyketide lovastatin: enzyme-catalyzed diels-alder reactions (1999)
- Doctoral advisor: John C. Vederas

Karine Auclair is a Canadian chemist. She holds a Tier 1 Canada Research Chair in Antimicrobials and Green Enzymes at McGill University.

== Early life and education ==
Auclair was born and raised in Jonquière, Québec in a low-income family. While she originally intended to pursue her Bachelor of Science abroad, her student visa was lost in the mail. Auclair thus completed her Bachelor of Science in chemistry at Université du Québec à Chicoutimi and received the Governor General's Academic Medal for graduating with the highest grade point average. Following her undergraduate degree, Auclair enrolled at the University of Alberta for her PhD in organic chemistry. As both Auclair and her mother took a cholesterol-lowering agent for high blood pressure, her research focused on understanding how fungi naturally synthesized lovastatin. This resulted in her discovering the first enzyme to catalyze a Diels-Alder reaction. Following her PhD, Auclair completed a post-doctoral fellowship in pharmaceutical chemistry at the University of California, San Francisco from 1999 to 2001.

== Career ==
Auclair joined the Department of Chemistry at McGill University in 2002 as an assistant professor.

Auclair was promoted to the rank of Full Professor in 2016. Three years later, she was named a Tier 1 Canada Research Chair in Antimicrobials and Green Enzymes. In 2023, Auclair received the Clara Benson Award in recognition of her "distinguished contribution to chemistry while working in Canada." She was also appointed to the Board of Directors of the French biochemistry company Carbios.

== Selected publications ==
- Kennedy, Jonathan; Auclair, Karine; Kendrew, Steven G.; Park, Cheonseok; Vederas, John C.; Hutchinson, C. Richard (21 May 1999). "Modulation of Polyketide Synthase Activity by Accessory Proteins During Lovastatin Biosynthesis". Science. 284 (5418): 1368–1372. Bibcode:1999Sci...284.1368K. doi:10.1126/science.284.5418.1368. PMID 10334994.
- Auclair, Karine; Sutherland, Andrew; Kennedy, Jonathan; Witter, David J.; Van den Heever, Johan P.; Hutchinson, C. Richard; Vederas, John C. (22 November 2000). "Lovastatin Nonaketide Synthase Catalyzes an Intramolecular Diels−Alder Reaction of a Substrate Analogue". Journal of the American Chemical Society. 122 (46): 11519–11520. Bibcode:2000JAChS.12211519A. doi:10.1021/ja003216+.
- Auclair, Karine; Hu, Zhengbo; Little, Dorothy M.; Ortiz de Montellano, Paul R.; Groves, John T. (May 2002). "Revisiting the Mechanism of P450 Enzymes with the Radical Clocks Norcarane and Spiro[2,5]octane". Journal of the American Chemical Society. 124 (21): 6020–6027. Bibcode:2002JAChS.124.6020A. doi:10.1021/ja025608h. PMID 12022835.
