= Sylvie Lorente =

French mechanical engineer

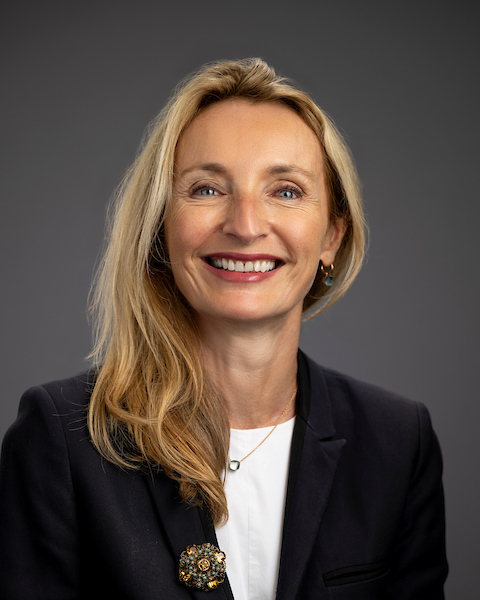

Sylvie Lorente is a French mechanical engineer known for her research on the thermodynamics and fluid mechanics of porous media, and in particular for her work on the constructal theory of flows and their dynamic evolution. She is the inaugural holder of the William M. Brown Endowed Chair in Mechanical Engineering at Villanova University, Adjunct Professor of Mechanical Engineering and Materials Science at Duke University, and professor (exceptional class) at the Institut National des Sciences Appliquées de Toulouse. She is currently the Senior Associate Dean for Research and Innovation in the College of Engineering of Villanova University.

== Education and career ==
Lorente studied civil engineering at INSA Toulouse (the Institut National des Sciences Appliquées de Toulouse), earning bachelor's and master's degrees in 1992 and a Ph.D. in 1996.

She became a faculty member at INSA Toulouse, working as an assistant professor from 1995 to 1997, an associate professor from 1997 to 2006, a full professor from 2006 to 2015, and professor (exceptional class) in 2015. She added her affiliations as adjunct professor at Duke University in 2006, extraordinary professor at the University of Pretoria in 2011, and College of Engineering Chair Professor in Mechanical Engineering at Villanova University in 2019.

== Books ==
Lorente has authored several books including:

- Porous and Complex Flow Structures in Modern Technologies (with Adrian Bejan, Ibrahim Dincer, António F. Miguel, and A. Heitor Reis, Springer, 2004)
- La loi constructale (with Bejan, L'Harmattan, 2005)
- Design with Constructal Theory (with Bejan, Wiley, 2008)

Her edited volumes include:

- Constructal Human Dynamics, Security and Sustainability (with Bejan, Miguel, and Reis, IOS Press, 2009)
- Constructal Law and the Unifying Principle of Design (with Bejan and Luis A. O. Rocha, Springer, 2013)

== Recognition ==
The American Society of Mechanical Engineers gave Lorente their Edward F. Obert Award, jointly with Adrian Bejan, in 2004, and gave her their Bergles–Rohsenow Young Investigator Award in Heat Transfer in 2005. The International Centre for Heat and Mass Transfer gave her their inaugural Hartnett–Irvine Award in 2007, with Bejan, for their work on constructal theory.

Lorente was named to the Ordre des Palmes académiques in 2008, and in 2015 she was named a knight (chevalier) in the Ordre national du Mérite. She was elected to the Academia Europaea in 2019. She joined the governing body of the European Research Council (ERC), the Scientific Council, in 2022.
