= Laboratoire Plasma et Conversion d'Energie =

French research laboratory

Coordinates: 43.5614°N 1.4695°E

The Laboratoire Plasma et Conversion d'Energie (LAPLACE), Toulouse is a Centre National de la Recherche Scientifique (CNRS) laboratory, operated jointly by the CNRS, the University of Toulouse and the Institut National Polytechnique of Toulouse. This facility is located near other important higher education facilities in Toulouse, France: the Paul Sabatier University, SUPAERO, the ENAC, the INSA, as well as other research centers (the ONERA and the CNES).

Research at LAPLACE is multidisplinary by nature. LAPLACE has active research programs in the following areas :

Technological plasmas and their applications. Cold plasma Physical and electrical Engeeniring, High pressure plasmas and Low temperature plasmas. Plasmas for Gas circuit breaker development and Plasma medicine. Transport phenomena. Dielectric materials (polymers in particular) and their integration into systems. Design of electrical systems. Optimization of control systems and converters.

== Application areas ==
Biology and health (as for instance plasmas for cancer therapy, gene transfection, decontamination and sterilisation) Environment and energy. Transport. Aeronautics and space.
