= Didier Quillot =

French businessman (born 1959)

- Born: 18 May 1959 (age 67); Mas-Grenier, France
- Education: INSA Toulouse; IAE Paris
- Occupation: Chief executive of the LFP
- Term: 2016–present

Didier Quillot (French: [didjɛʁ kijo]; born 18 May 1959) is a French businessman, and a former Chief Executive of Orange France (subsidiary of France Télécom), and since 2016 the Chief Executive of France's Ligue de Football Professionnel.

== Early life ==
He was born in Mas-Grenier, Tarn-et-Garonne, in the Occitanie region of France. He gained a diploma in Electronic Engineering from Institut national des sciences appliquées de Toulouse (INSA Toulouse), part of Toulouse Tech. He gained a further degree from the Institut d'administration des entreprises de Paris.

== Career ==
=== France Télécom ===
He joined France Télécom in 1994. From 2001 to 2006 he was the Chief Executive of Orange France, the mobile phone network of France Télécom.

=== Ligue de Football Professionnel ===
He became Chief Executive of the Ligue de Football Professionnel in March 2016.

== See also ==
- Stéphane Richard, current chief executive what became of France Télécom

Sporting positions
| Preceded by Jean-Pierre Hugues | Chief Executive of the Ligue de Football Professionnel (LFP); March 2016 – | Succeeded by Incumbent |
Business positions
| Preceded by | Chief Executive of Orange France (subsidiary of France Télécom); 2001 – 2006 | Succeeded by |
