= Kathryn S Lilley =

Professor of biochemistry

- Education: University of Sheffield
- Scientific career
- Fields: Proteomics
- Workplaces: University of Cambridge

Kathryn S Lilley is a professor of biochemistry at the University of Cambridge, director of the Cambridge Centre for Proteomics, and an elected member of the European Molecular Biology Organization (EMBO).

Lilley is a member of the Jesus College at the University of Cambridge, where she holds the position of Director of Studies in Natural Sciences (Biological Part II Biochemistry and Genetics and Biological Part III Biochemistry and Systems Biology).

== Career ==
Kathryn S Lilley received her BSc and PhD in biochemistry from the University of Sheffield. After leading a research laboratory at the University of Leicester for 11 years, she established the Cambridge Centre for Proteomics at the University of Cambridge in 2001. In 2012, Lilley became Professor of Cell Dynamics in the Department of Biochemistry at the University of Cambridge and the Deputy Head of the Department of Biochemistry in 2023.

Professor Lilley is known for her research in the study of dynamic changes in the cellular proteome and transcriptome, and the development of open-source software for the analysis and visualization of complex molecular data. Lilley's research focuses on developing new technologies to study subcellular architecture, localization/abundance of proteins, and how these change under perturbations. These technologies include Localisation of Organelle Proteins by Isotope Tagging (LOPIT), Localization of organelle proteins using data-independent acquisition (DIA-LOP), and orthogonal organic phase separation (OOPS). These technologies are applied in the Lilley lab group to a large range of scenarios, from vaccine safety to protein stability in extremophiles.

== Awards ==
Her research activity has been recognized with the Wellcome Trust Investigator Award in 2015, the Juan Pablo Albar Proteome Pioneer Award from the European Proteomics Association (EuPA) in 2017, and the Award for Distinguished Achievement in Proteomic Sciences from the Human Proteome Organization (HuPO) in 2018.
