= Carbios =

French biochemistry company

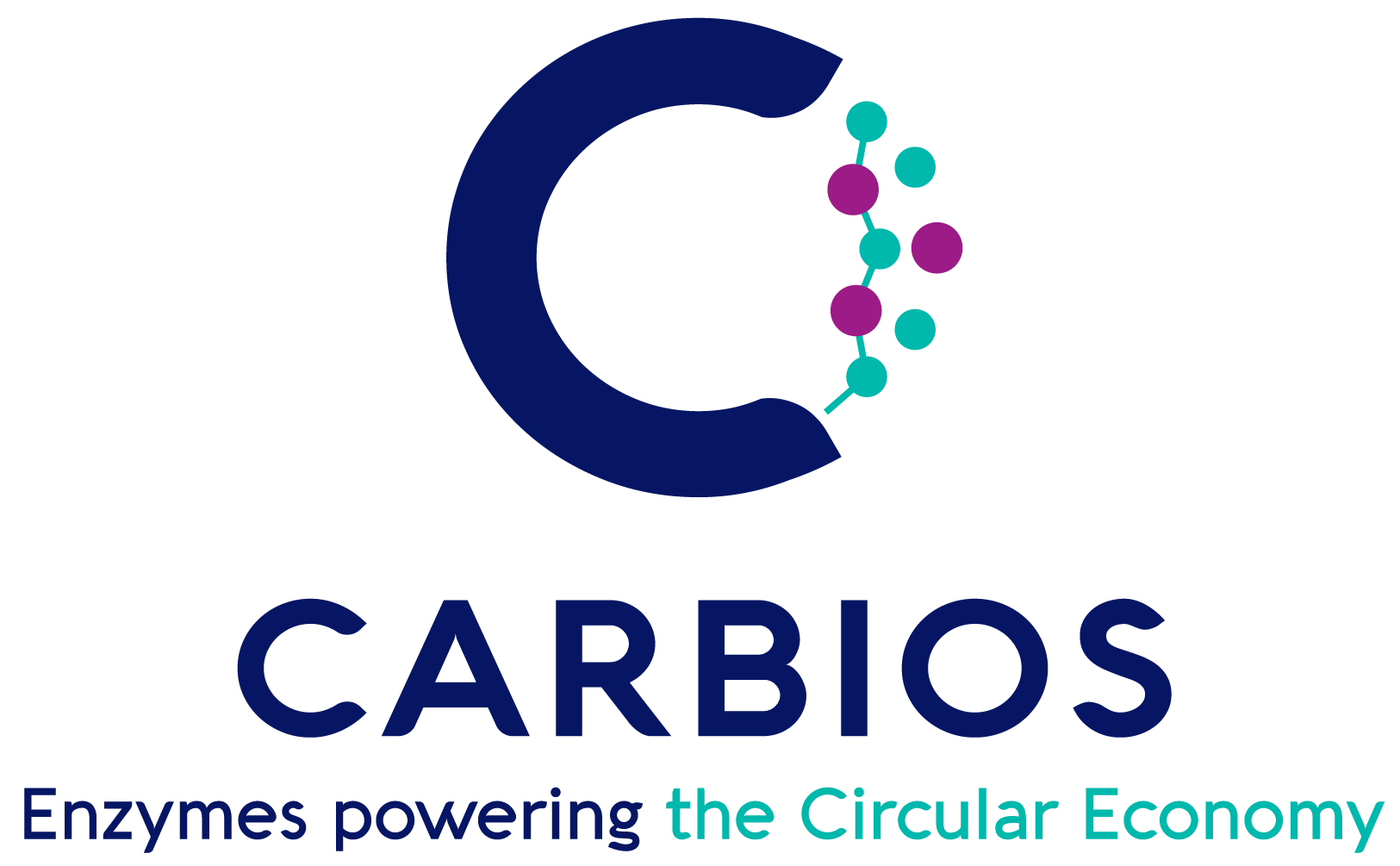
- Company type: Public
- Traded as: Euronext Growth ALCRB
- ISIN: FR0011648716
- Industry: Biochemistry
- Founded: 2011; 15 years ago
- Founders: Jean-Claude Lumaret
- Headquarters: Biopôle Clermont-Limagne, France
- Area served: Worldwide
- Services: Biodegradation; Depolymerization; Recycling; Biotechnology
- Subsidiaries: Carbolice
- Website: www.carbios.com/en/

Carbios is a French company in the field of biochemistry. It holds a number of patents in various countries. One of Carbios' notable inventions is an industrial application of enzymes that can render PET plastic waste compostable.

The company is based on the Cataroux campus in Clermont-Ferrand. One of their partners is the INSA Toulouse (National Institute for Applied Sciences).

== History ==
Carbios was founded in 2011. Since 2013 it has been listed at the stock index Euronext Growth, a subsidiary of Euronext.

On January 19, 2019, Carbios announced a partnership with Toulouse White Biotechnology (TWB) as a new investor.

In April 2020 Carbios gained attention due to an article in Nature which explained how a hydrolase enzyme designed by Carbios enabled the recycling of 90% of all PET plastic waste within 10 hours. Following this development a number of big companies such as PepsiCo and Nestle became partners. Carbios has partnered with major French companies, including cosmetics giant L'Oréal, food manufacturer Nestlé, and outdoor gear brand Salomon, to recycle their plastic waste.

Emmanuel Ladent, the CEO of Carbios, said the company's plastic recycling process currently produces 51% less emissions than manufacturing new plastic.

In 2023, Carbios had a capacity to recycle around 250kg of plastic per day. In 2025, the company plans to open a much larger facility near the France-Belgium border that will have the capacity to recycle over 130 tons of plastic per day.

== Main Stockholders ==
L’Oréal Development (BOLD)	5.86%
Copernicus Wealth Management	5.84%
Michelin Ventures	4.32%
L’Occitane Group	2.34%
Management and treasury shares	0.06%
Free float	81.58%

== Structure ==
Carbios runs three departments, all based on their application of enzymes:

- General biodegradation
- Depolymerization of plastic waste
- Biotechnology for the production of plastic from biological ingredients such as lactic acid.

In order to pursue the further development concerning biodegradation, Carbios has founded the subsidiary Carbiolice, which is a joint-venture with Limagrain and Novozymes.
