= Centre for Materials Elaboration and Structural Studies =

Research center in Toulouse, France

Coordinates: 43°34′46″N 1°27′49″E

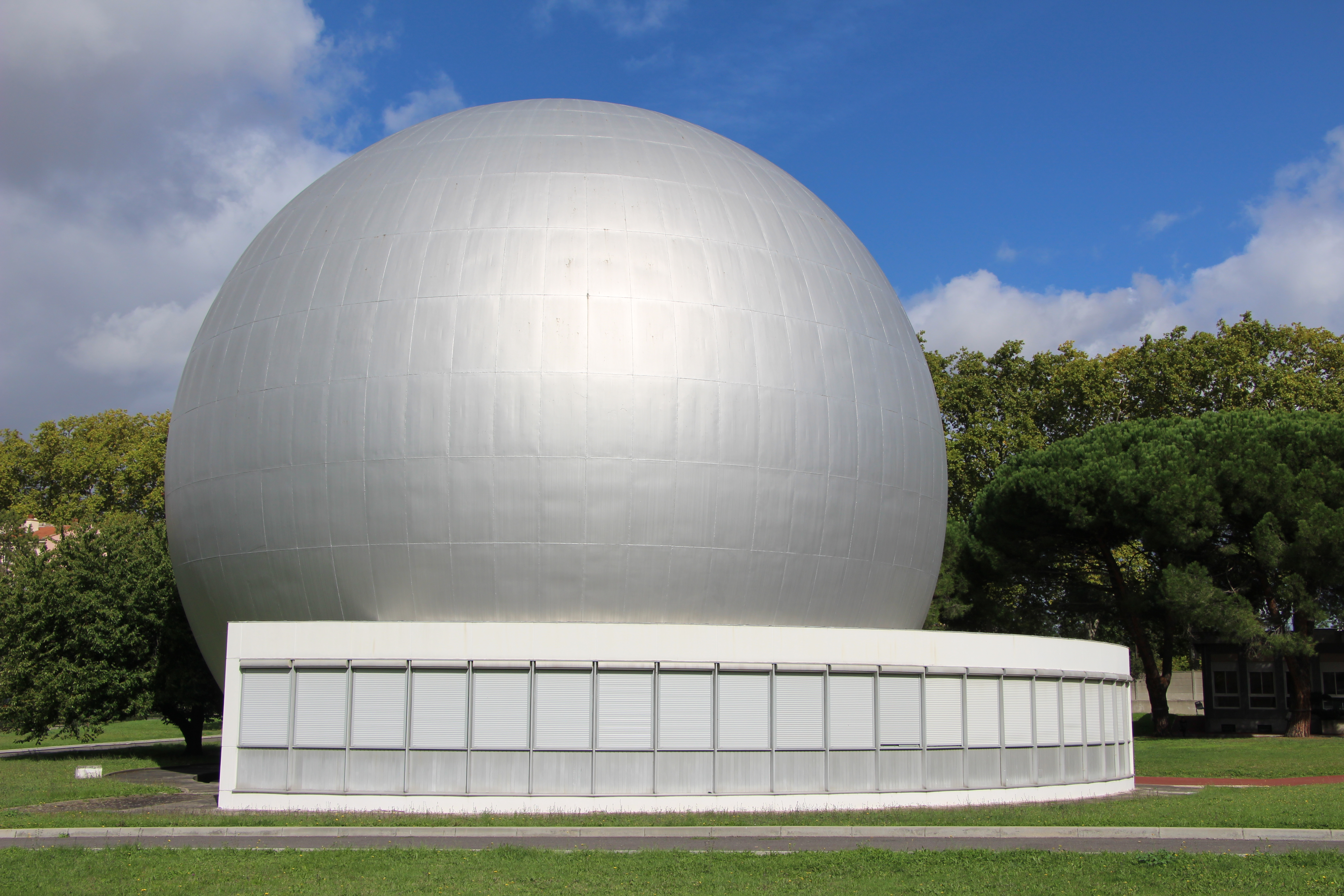
The Boule

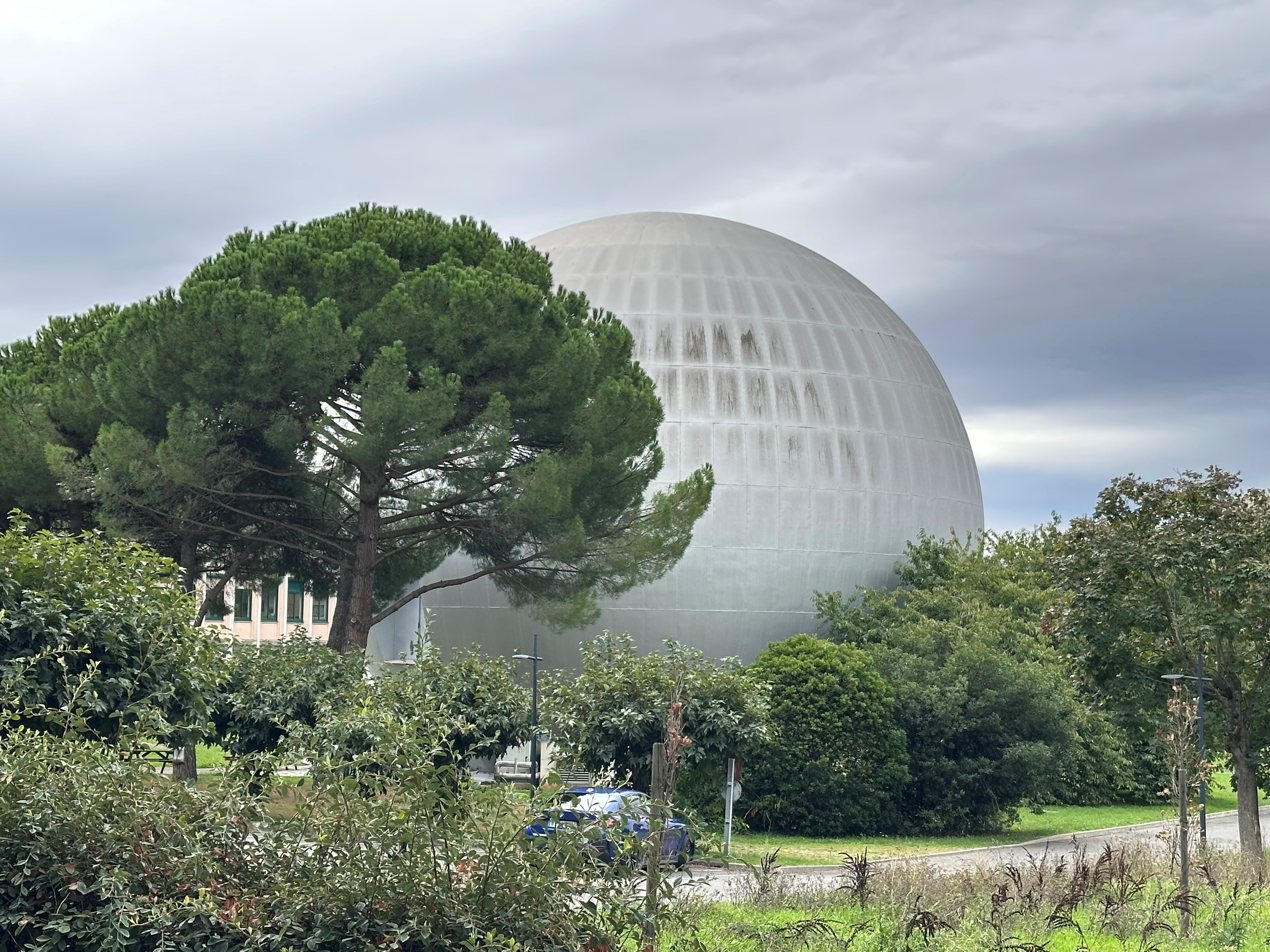
The Boule seen from the Canal du Midi.

The "Centre d’Élaboration de Matériaux et d’Etudes Structurales" (CEMES) is a CNRS laboratory located in Toulouse, France.

CEMES is a public fundamental research laboratory specializing in solid state physics, nanosciences, molecular chemistry and materials science. Its activities cover a spectrum from synthesizing (nano)materials and molecular systems to study and modelling of their structures and physical properties (optical, mechanical, electronic and magnetic) and their integration in devices.

An important part of the laboratory's experimental activity is studying and manipulating individual objects whose characteristic sizes are at the nanometric or atomic scales. Most of this experimental work uses state-of-the-art instrumentation supported by instrumental and methodological developments in the laboratory's fields of transmission electron microscopy, near-field microscopy and optical spectroscopy. These research and development themes integrate modelling and theoretical studies carried out at different scales within the laboratory.

CEMES is a CNRS laboratory associated with Toulouse III - Paul Sabatier University and Institut National des Sciences Appliquées de Toulouse (INSA). Created in 1988, CEMES followed the previous Laboratoire d’Optique Electronique (LOE) created in 1957 by Prof. Gaston Dupouy.

In contact with the academic community, CEMES is involved in training given at the university at every level: Bachelor, Master and Doctorate.

CEMES currently hosts about 150 people. In February 2026 this included: 33 full-time CNRS researchers, 24 University professors or assistant professors, 34 engineers, technicians and administrative staff, and 14 postdocs, 25 Ph.D. students, and many undergraduate students.

== Objectives ==
1. Studying structures and properties of nanomaterials and nanostructures at the atomic scale
2. Establishing relationships between nano and microstructures and the physical properties of various kinds of materials and nanomaterials
3. Inventing and developing new instruments and measurement techniques and methodologies for the study of these "(nano) objects" at relevant spatial and temporal scales
4. Creating and developing molecular nano-machines prototypes

== Research teams ==
There are seven research teams at CEMES:

- PPM: Physics of Plasticity and Metallurgy
- M3: Multi-Scale and Multi-functional Materials
- SINanO: Surfaces, Interfaces and NanoObjects
- MEM: Materials and devices for Electronics and Magnetism
- NeO: Nano-Optics and Nanomaterials for Optics
- I3EM: In situ interferometry and instrumentation for electron microscopy
- GNS: Nanoscience

== Main facilities ==
The CEMES experimental facilities face the challenges of fabrication and imaging of "nano-objects" as well as the manipulation of their physical properties:

- Eight transmission electron microscopes (including two prototypes) dedicated to chemical analysis, defect identification, atomic imaging, electron holography, and in situ studies
- Seven near-field microscopes (four-tip STM, UHV low-T STM, two AFM-NC/KPFM, Photon STM, two commercial AFM)
- Three X-ray diffractometers (including a WAXS and a powder micro-diffractometer)
- Four Raman spectrometers (visible, UV, TERS,... ), three optical measurement benches (photoluminescence, reflectivity, fluorescence decay, magneto-optics, ...)
- An ultra-low energy ion implanter, two sputtering machines, one of which with a nanoparticle source, an MBE, an RIE, different metallic, dielectric and passivation deposition machines, laser and optical lithography, and two FIBs, one of which with an electron lithography process

== The Boule ==
The Boule is a large spherical steel building, 25 meters in diameter, an icon for CEMES. The construction of the Boule was initiated by Gaston Dupouy, and the building was inaugurated in 1959 by General de Gaulle. It was designed to house the 1-million-volt electron microscope that operated from 1960 to 1991. The original microscope was later dismantled, but the electron accelerator has been preserved and still stands under the vault of the sphere.
