= Paul Sabatier University =

French university founded in 1229

Coordinates: 43°33′43″N 1°28′06″E

- Université Paul Sabatier
- Motto: Les sciences au coeur
- Established: 1229 (former university), 1969 (UT3)
- Affiliations: University of Toulouse,
- Endowment: €328 M
- President: Odile Rauzy
- Faculty: 2,509 (2016)
- Students: 31,987
- Location: 118 Route de Narbonne, F-31062 Toulouse, Toulouse, France
- Nickname: UPS
- Website: www.univ-tlse3.fr

Paul Sabatier University, (Note: Université Paul Sabatier [ynivɛʁsite pɔl sabatje]; Occitan: Universitat Paulo Sabatier, UPS) also known as Toulouse 3, was a public university located in Toulouse, France. It was one of the several successor universities of the University of Toulouse, established in 1229, making it one of the earliest universities to emerge in Europe. On January 1, 2023, the existing Toulouse University System, which included Toulouse III, was renamed the Université de Toulouse. Then, on January 1, 2025, Toulouse III – Paul Sabatier University adopted the name Université de Toulouse (University of Toulouse), absorbing and incorporating the former Toulouse University System, with the Purpan Engineering School as a graduate school.

Toulouse III was named after Paul Sabatier, winner of the 1912 Nobel Prize in Chemistry. In 1969, it was established on the foundations of the old Toulouse university that was itself founded in 1229.

Université Toulouse-III was a leading educational institution in France and the Midi-Pyrénées region. It offered a wide range of programs in science, technology, health and athletics.

== University research activities ==
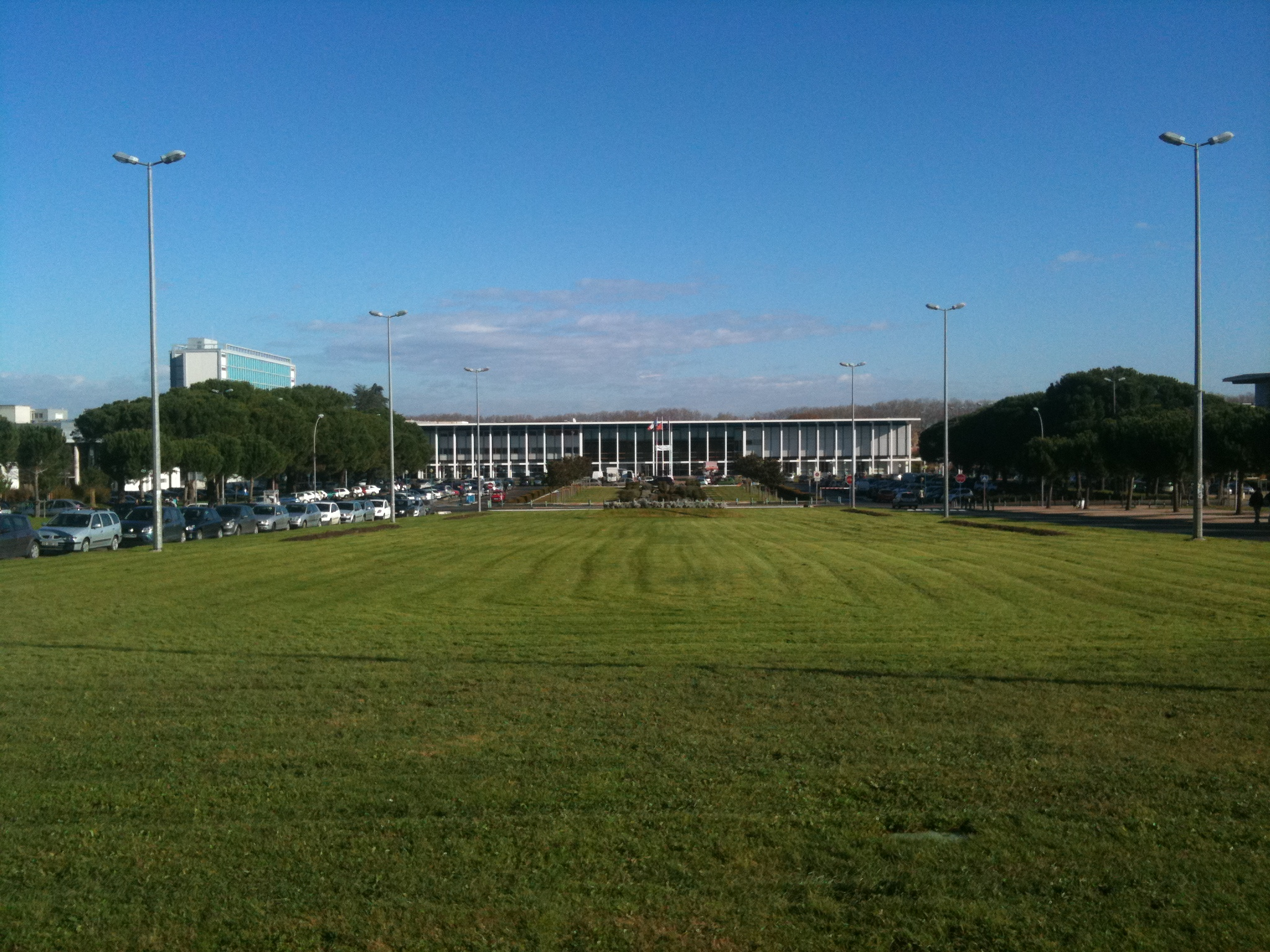
Administration building located at the entrance of UPS

The following list is not exhaustive.

- Mathematics
  - Plasma and energy conversion laboratory (LAPLACE)
- Space, astrophysics, aeronautics
  - Toulouse Space Center
  - Higher Institute of Aeronautics and Space (ISAE SUPAERO)
  - National School of Civil Aviation (ENAC)
  - ISSAT,
  - Aerospace Valley
- Computer science and electronics
  - Toulouse Institute for Computer Science Research (IRIT)
- Biology, geoscience, earth sciences, climate
  - Institute of Pharmacology and Structural Biology
- Health
- Chemistry
- Materials
  - Centre for Materials Elaboration and Structural Studies (CEMES)

== University rankings ==
- Shanghai ranking (2022)
  - Overall ranking : 201-300
  - Best Ranked Subjects
    - Remote Sensing : 7
    - Oceanography : 17
    - Earth Sciences : 28
    - Ecology : 37
    - Mathematics : 51-75
    - Atmospheric Science : 51-75
    - Water Resources : 51-75
    - Mining & Mineral Engineering : 51-75
- QS (2026)
  - Overall ranking : =587

== Major fields of study ==
Paul Sabatier University provides a diverse array of academic programs, encompassing licence (bachelor's), master's, and doctoral degrees across a wide spectrum of disciplines, such as science, engineering, health sciences, and sports-related fields.

== Notable alumni ==
- Aurore Avarguès-Weber (1983-), cognitive science researcher.
- Hélène Bergès (1966-), French biologist, graduated with a PhD in genetics and molecular biology from UPS in 1995, director of the national plant genomic center (CNRGV) at INRA since 2003, chevalière of the Legion of Honor since 2015.
- Anny Cazenave (1944-), French oceanographer, engineer emeritus at CNES (french space agency), elected to the French Academy of Sciences in 2004 in the Sciences of the Universe section, Officer of the Légion d'Honneur since 2010.
- Merieme Chadid (1969-), Franco-Moroccan astronomer, graduated with a PhD in Astronomy and Space Studies from UPS in 1996.
- Corinne Charbonnel (1965-), French astrophysicist, associate professor at the Geneva Observatory and research director at the CNRS, graduated with a PhD in astrophysics and space techniques in 1992 from the UPS.
- Michel Chassang (1956-), a talented French doctor who graduated in medicine from UPS in 1984.
- Pierre Cohen (1950-), French politician, mayor of Toulouse from 2008 to 2014, holds a doctorate in computer science from UPS, and was a research engineer in computer science at Toulouse Institute for Computer Science Research (IRIT) until 1997.
- Philippe Douste-Blazy (1953-), cardiologist and French politician, member of parliament and mayor of Lourdes(1989-2000) then Toulouse(2001-2004), several times minister (Culture, Health, Foreign Affairs), special advisor to the Secretary-General of the United Nations from 2017 to 2021, former professor of medicine at Toulouse University Hospital from 1988 to 2016, visiting professor at Harvard University Medical School since 2016.
- Bérengère Dubrulle (1965-), French astrophysicist, graduated with a PhD from UPS in 1990.
- Abdelhaq El Jai (1948-), mathematician specializing in systems theory, Professor Emeritus at the University of Perpignan and member of the Académie Hassan II des Sciences et Techniques (Morocco).
- Pierre Izard (1935-), French pediatrician and politician, graduated from the Toulouse medical school in 1966.
- Albert Jacquard (1925-2013), French biologist, geneticist and essayist, with a doctorate in genetics (1970) and a state doctorate in human biology (1972) from UPS.
- Jean-Claude Laprie (1944-2010), French computer science researcher, awarded a doctorate in computer science and a state doctorate in 1975 on fault tolerance and dependability of computer systems at UPS, research team leader at the Laboratory for Analysis and Architecture of Systems (LAAS) from 1975 to 1996, director of LAAS until 2002, chevalier de l'ordre national du Mérite, CNRS research director emeritus.
- Sylvestre Maurice (1966-), astrophysicist at the Institute for Research in Astrophysics and Planetology since 1998, astronomer at the Observatoire Midi-Pyrénées since 2007, graduated from the UPS in 1993 and is a university professor.
- Yannick Mellier (1958-), French astrophysicist, graduated from UPS in 1987 with a PhD in astrophysics.
- Bertrand Monthubert (1970-), French mathematician and politician, former president of the UPS (2012-2015), lecturer (1998) then university professor at the UPS (2007), teaches at the Tarbes University Institute of Technology.
- Jean-Pierre Riba (1944-2001), lecturer (1980) then university professor (1982) in biotechnologies at the UPS Institute of Chemical Engineering, with an engineering degree (1968), a doctorate (1971) and a state doctorate from the UPS (1978).
- Valérie Van Grootel (1981-), Belgian astronomer and astrophysicist, with a PhD in astrophysics from UPS, on a post-doctoral contract from 2008 to 2010.

== Notable current faculty members ==
- Guy Bertrand, chemistry professor at the University of California, San Diego, US
- Pierre Cohen, member of the National Assembly of France
