= Institut national des sciences appliquées de Toulouse =

French engineering school

Coordinates: 43.57073°N 1.46824°E

National Institute for Applied Sciences (INSA Toulouse)
- Institut National des Sciences Appliquées de Toulouse
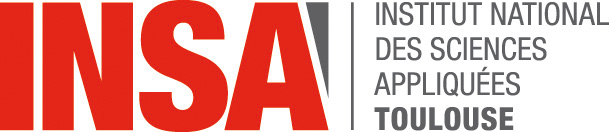
- Type: Grande école d'ingénieurs (public research university Engineering school)
- Established: 1963; 63 years ago
- Parent institution: Institut national des sciences appliquées (INSA)
- Academic affiliations: Conférence des Grandes écoles Federal University of Toulouse Midi-Pyrénées; Toulouse Tech
- President: Bertrand RAQUET
- Students: 3,169; 38% female 23% international
- Location: Toulouse, France
- Language: English-only & French-only instruction
- Website: www.insa-toulouse.fr

INSA Toulouse

The Institut National des Sciences Appliquées de Toulouse (French pronunciation: [ɛ̃stity nɑsjɔnal de sjɑ̃s(z‿)aplike də tuluz]; "Toulouse National Institute for Applied Sciences"; Occitan: Institut nacionau de sciéncias aplicadas de Tolosa) or INSA Toulouse is a French grande école of engineering, under the authority of the French Ministry of Education and Research. Situated in Toulouse, this school is one of the 6 state engineering institutes that compose the INSA network.

The school was founded in 1963 to train highly qualified engineers, foster continuous training and scientific research. It is a member of the University of Toulouse since 2007. Even though INSA Toulouse is highly selective (its offer rate was 10.1% in 2020, for an Applications/accepted ratio of 1.48%), diversity and international openness are two values to which INSA Toulouse gives priority: the school is composed of 38% female students, 32% of students are scholarship holders, and 23% of students are international.

The INSA Toulouse is located along the Canal du Midi on the university campus that includes Université Paul Sabatier III, Supaero and ENAC. Along with those schools, INSA Toulouse is a founding member of the Federal University of Toulouse Midi-Pyrénées (French: Université fédérale de Toulouse Midi-Pyrénées), the association of universities and higher education institutions (ComUE), which is reconstituting the collective Université de Toulouse. As a member, INSA Toulouse coordinates the training offers and the research and transfer strategies of 31 public university and research establishments within the Occitanie region, has its own budgetary allocation, and can issue diplomas. Among others, this membership includes all large campuses in Toulouse: Capitole University, Jean Jaurès, Paul Sabatier University, TBS Education, Sciences Po Toulouse, ISAE-SUPAERO, as well as the 7 grandes écoles of the National Polytechnic Institute of Toulouse. Within the Université de Toulouse, INSA Toulouse also awards double-diplomas in engineering and business administration with TBS Education, Toulouse School of Management, and joint training with IMT Mines Albi, ISAE-SUPEARO and INP-ENSEEIHT.

== Academics ==
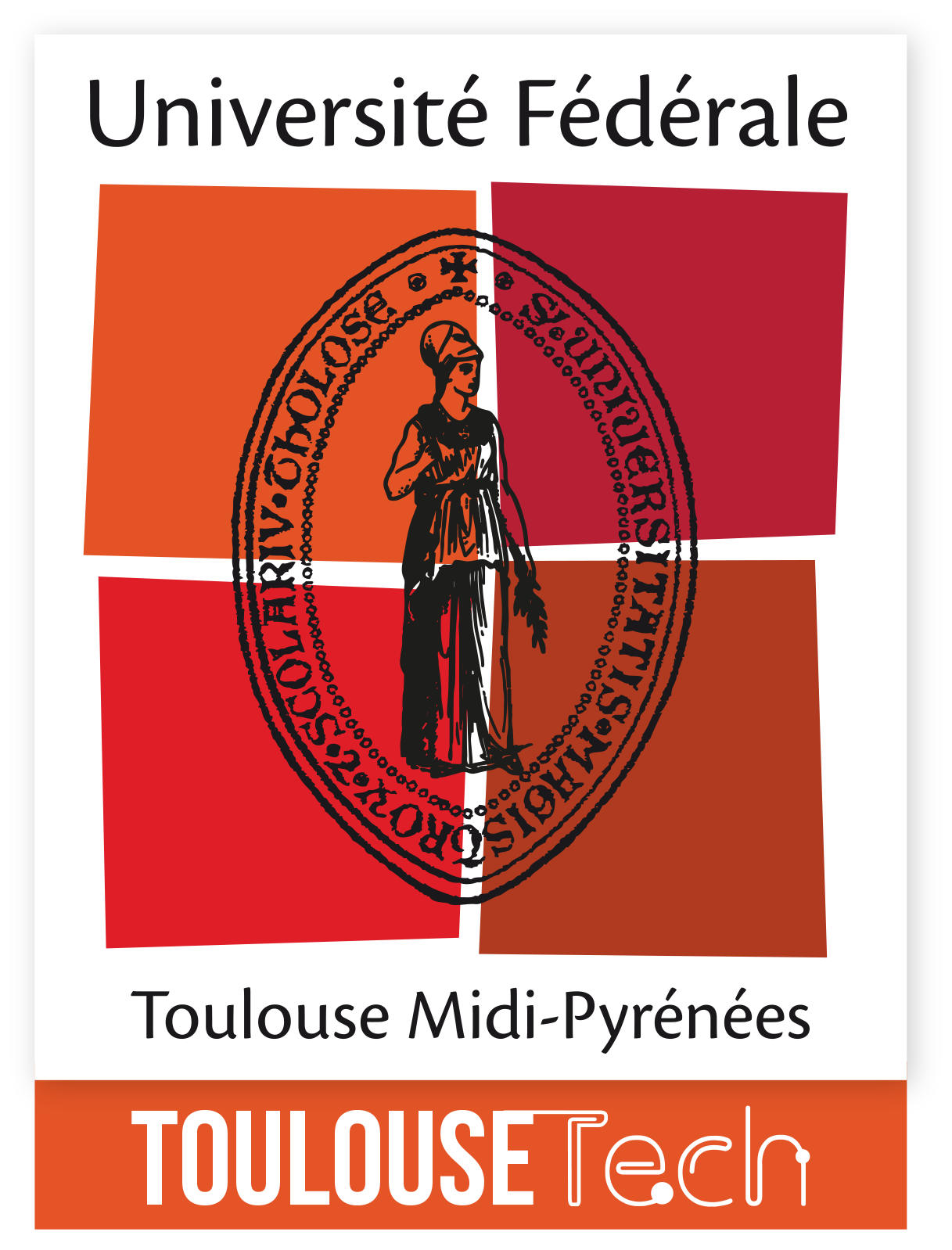

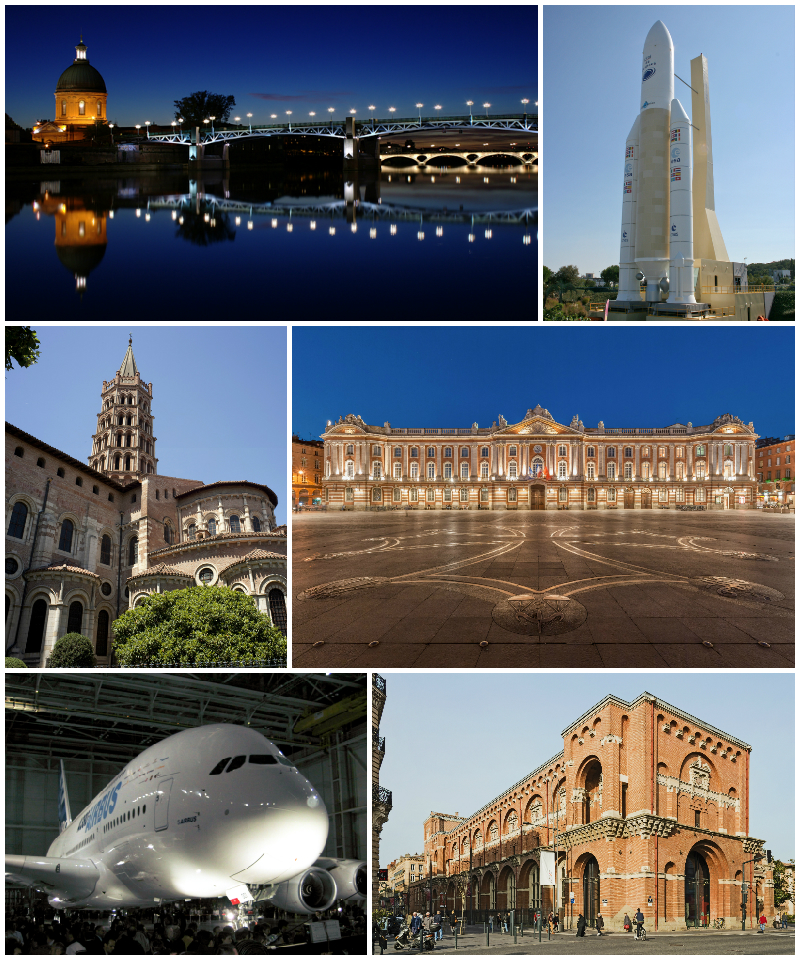

INSA Toulouse is one of several engineering schools within the Institut National des Sciences Appliquées (INSA) network under the supervision of the Ministry of the Economy and Finance (France) (French: Ministre de l'Économie et des Finances. All INSA engineering schools are Grandes Écoles, a French institution of higher education that is separate from, but parallel and connected to the main framework of the French public university system. Similar to the Ivy League in the United States, Oxbridge in the UK, and C9 League in China, Grandes Écoles are elite academic institutions that admit students through an extremely competitive process. Alums go on to occupy elite positions within government, administration, and corporate firms in France.

Although INSA engineering schools are selective and can be more expensive than public universities in France, Grandes Écoles typically have much smaller class sizes and student bodies, and many of their programs are taught in English. International internships, study abroad opportunities, and close ties with government and the corporate world are a hallmark of the Grandes Écoles. Many of the top ranked schools in Europe are members of the Conférence des Grandes Écoles (CGE), as are INSA engineering schools. Degrees from INSA are accredited by the Conférence des Grandes Écoles and awarded by the Ministry of National Education (France) (French: Le Ministère de L'éducation Nationale).

=== Diplômes d'Ingénieur ===
==== New European program ====
In 2002, INSA Toulouse decided to reform its structure to adapt to the European 3/5/8 system. The Engineering degree is obtained after five years of studies. The new programme, better adapted to the social and economic environment, includes a one-year common core, two years of pre-specialization and two years of specialization. The selection level at INSA Toulouse has greatly increased since the European reform, and it now makes the INSA Toulouse one of the most elitist universities in France, with an average grade at the Baccalauréat exam (high school achievement exam) of 17.05/20, equivalent to the grades 1.0 or A in Anglo-Saxon countries.

==== Specializations ====
INSA Toulouse offers master level degrees (Diplôme d'Ingénieur) in the following 8 specializations:

- Biological engineering
- Mathematical modeling and AI
- Mechanical engineering
- Applied physics
- Civil engineering
- Chemical engineering
- Computer and networks engineering
- Automatic control and Electronics

Note that other specializations are possible in the other INSAs (Lyon, Rennes, Rouen, Strasbourg, Centre Val de Loire).

=== Research Masters ===
In parallel of the regular Masters in Engineering, students may also follow one of the research masters, taught in French:

- Civil Engineering: Sustainable Engineering – research and innovation in materials and structures
- Mechanical/Energy/Thermic Engineering: Fluid dynamics, Energetics and Transfers
- Mechanical Engineering: Sciences for Mechanics of Material and Structures
- Embedded Networks and Connected objects – Security of information systems and networks

=== Advanced Masters’s Degree ===
INSA Toulouse delivers three Mastères Spécialisés, also called post master's degree for students already holding a master's degree. These masters are taught in English in the following subjects:

- Advanced Master in Safety Engineering & Management
- Advanced Master Business Engineering and International Affairs
- Advanced Master in Innovative and Secure IoT systems

=== Masters of Science and Technology ===
- At INSA Toulouse, four master's degrees are especially designed for international students:
- Electronic systems for embedded communications and applications
- Fluids Engineering for Industrial Processes
- Water Engineering and Water Management
- Industrial & Safety Engineering

=== Doctoral studies ===
Doctoral studies are managed together with other universities and engineering schools of Toulouse. PhD candidates can study in one of the following "écoles doctorales":

- Aeronautics and Astronautics
- Electrical, Electronic and Telecommunications Engineering
- Mathematics, Informatics and Telecommunications
- Mechanics, Energetics, Civil Engineering and Processes
- Materials Sciences
- Ecology, Agronomy, Bioengineering and Veterinary Sciences
- Systems engineering

== International ==
During their study, each student must spend a minimum of 12 weeks abroad, either as part of a semester in a partner university or during an internship, but some stay longer or spend considerably more time in a foreign country. In Europe, exchanges take place in the framework of the Erasmus programme, with partnerships in UK (University of Bristol, University of Nottingham, University of Cardiff, University of Glasgow, etc.), Germany (Universität Hamburg, Technische Universität Hamburg-Harburg, etc.), Italy (Politecnico di Milano, Politecnico di Torino), Spain, Netherlands, Scandinavian countries, in Eastern countries and so on INSA Toulouse also offers double-degrees with 20 foreign institutions, including: Instituto Tecnologico de Buenos Aires, Pontificia Universidade Catolica do Rio de Janeiro, Universidade Estadual de Campinas, Seoul National University, Universitat Politècnica de Catalunya, Universidad Politecnica de Madrid, etc.

In addition to receiving short-term exchange students, INSA Toulouse participates in several exchange programmes with universities around the world:

- ERASMUS - Over 130 partnership agreements with universities in 21 European countries.
- ECIU University - Since 2019, INSA has been a member of the European Alliance University, a research and training partnership with 12 European partner institutions.
- FITEC - Cooperative training and internships with many universities in Argentina (ARFITEC), Brazil (BRAFITEC) and Mexico (MEXFITEC).
- Summer Schools - Cooperative summer programs with University of Texas at Austin and Mississippi State University in the U.S.
- ASINSA - Targeted for Asian students (primarily from China, Vietnam and Malaysia) interested in engineering in France.
- IBERINSA - Targeted for Spanish speaking students interested in engineering in France.

== Research ==
INSA Toulouse conducts research in the following subjects:

- aeronautics, space, embedded systems
- environment, health, biotechnologies, energy
- nanosciences and nanotechnologies
- towns, urban networks, information networks
- biomathematics, bioinformatics

The research programmes are run with partner institutions; the 8 research laboratories are:

- Toulouse Biotechnology Institute (Biosystems and Process Engineering Laboratory – LISPB) (in partnership with CNRS and INRA)
- Laboratory of Physics and Chemistry of Nano-objects – LPCNO (in partnership with UPS and CNRS)
- Laboratory for Materials and Construction Works Durability – LMDC (in partnership with UPS)
- Institut Clément Ader (in partnership with UPS, ISAE and EMAC)
- Institut de Mathématiques de Toulouse – IMT (in partnership with UPS, UT1, UT2 and CNRS)
- Laboratoire National des Champs Magnétiques Intenses – LNCMI (in partnership with CNRS, UPS and UJF)
- Laboratoire d'analyse et d'architecture des systèmes – LAAS (in partnership with CNRS)
- Centre for Materials Elaboration and Structural Studies – CEMES (in partnership with CNRS and UPS)

== INSA culture ==
The campus of INSA Toulouse is very active and flourishes with cultural activities. L’Amicale des Elèves and its over 70 students clubs offer a wide range of activities that will suit all tastes: outdoors and indoors sports, arts, events, social actions, leisure and so on.`There is also a student hall and a party hall in where insaïens (INSA students) can organize events and the school's newspaper informs student about the campus life. The web radio, “Radio Insa Toulouse”, created in 2007, aims to facilitate communication between students and the staff (administration, teachers, researchers...). Every year, an annual race around the campus called “Les 100 tours de l’INSA”, gather every student association during two days in a festive atmosphere.

In September 2000 was created Les Enfoiros, a student association, which aims to help Les Restos du Coeur (a French nationwide association that gives free meals to impoverished persons) collecting money through various concerts and other events all along the year. Since then, Les Enfoiros have raised around €250,000 for this association.

Moreover, the AIIT, the INSA Toulouse students association, is very active as well and aims to:

- Establish and maintain alumni contact
- Advise students and graduates in their professional life
- Develop cooperation between the Board and INSA's professors
- Promote the school and its values

The Toulouse Ingénierie Multidisciplinaire (TIM) (partnership with the Paul Sabatier University) is a state of the art student association whose objective is to conceive and build very low consumption prototype cars. Founded in 1995, the association takes part every year ever since in the Shell Eco Marathon, a European competition whose winner is the vehicle able to run the longest distance with one litre of gasoline equivalent. As a matter of facts, the TIM is one of the best teams in the world, breaking several world records throughout its history, such as: ICE Prototypes category (Internal Combustion Engine), ethanol fuel: 3350 km/L in 2009, on the Rokingham track (still valid in 2017)

== Rankings and acceptance rates ==
Rankings (national and international):

- 2nd place according to L'Express (06/01/2010), among 5-year schools. In the French education system, high school graduates go to "Prepa" courses for 2 years, then compete for engineering schools where they spend 3 more years; whereas other schools like INSA include the "Prepa" as part of their 5-year cursus. Ranking differ between these 2 categories.
- 2nd place for academic excellence (among 77) according to L'Etudiant (2021), among 5-year schools in France. 3rd place (among 77) overall.
- Shanghai Ranking by Subject 2021: despite its small size (500 students graduate each year overall, among which 48 in mathematics and 96 in biology, process engineering and environnement) INSA Toulouse is in the world top 200 in mathematics, and in the world top 300 in biotechnologies.

The average acceptance rates (percentage of candidates who have been offered admission) of the national competition taken by students after High school exams are indicated below:

Cursus	Number of spaces / applicants (2020)	Acceptance 2019	Acceptance 2020	Acceptance 2021
5-years curriculum	250 / 16,899	11.0%	10.1%	11.7%
Double degree with Sciences Po	24 / 1,076	/	2.4%	9.6%
3-years curriculum (after classes préparatoires)	33 / over 5,246	?	?	?

== Notable alumni ==
- Pierre Andurand, hedge fund manager of BlueGold Capital and Andurand Capital. Chairman of Glory (kickboxing).
- Sylvie Lorente, Chevalier de l'Ordre des Palmes académiques, elected to the Academia Europaea in 2019, member of the European Research Council (2022-2026).
- Louis Castex, former director of Arts et Métiers ParisTech and INSA Toulouse, former president of the University of Toulouse.
- Pierre Monsan (born on 25 June 1948, graduated in 1969), biochemist and entrepreneur, Professor emeritus at INSA Toulouse, founder of Toulouse White Biotechnology.
- Didier Quillot (born on 18 May 1959, graduated in 1981), chairman of Lagardère Active.
- Jean Botti (born on 14 April 1957, graduated in 1986), Chief Technical Officer (CTO) of EADS since 2006.
- Richard Attias (born on 19 November 1959), a Moroccan-born businessman. In 2008 he married former First Lady of France, Cécilia Ciganer-Albéniz, in New York.
- Romain Mesnil (born on 13 July 1977, graduated in 2001), a French Pole vaulter.
- Jean Bouilhou (born 7 December 1978, graduated in 2002), rugby player, played with the French national team.
- Thomas Castaignède, (born 21 January 1975) rugby player, played with the French national team.
- David Skrela (born 2 March 1979, graduated in 2003), rugby player, played with the French national team.
