= Indirect finance =

The flow of funds from lender to borrower

Indirect finance is where borrowers borrow funds from the financial market through indirect means, such as through a financial intermediary. This is different from direct financing where there is a direct connection to the financial markets as indicated by the borrower issuing securities directly on the market. Common methods for indirect financing include a financial auction (where price of the security is bid upon) or an initial public offering (where the security is sold for a set initial price). By allowing borrowers to obtain financing through a third party, indirect financing can improve risk management and liquidity.

== Indirect financing (government) ==
This is where the government gives privilege, in the form of reduced tax burdens, as a means of supporting a particular interest rather than collecting and redistributing tax revenue (which would be considered as a direct financing method by the government). For example, a reduced tax burden on financiers provides focused monetary benefits and helps to effectively lower bond prices (provided that tax savings has a tangible effect on bond pricing and that the aforementioned would pass these tax savings to their respective clientele). This could be applied in a number of applications from infrastructural investment to education or military spending.

== See also ==
- Direct finance
