= Direct finance =

The flow of funds from lender to borrower

Direct finance is a method of financing where borrowers borrow funds directly from the financial market without using a third party service, such as a financial intermediary. This is different from indirect financing where a financial intermediary takes the money from the lender with an interest rate and lends it to a borrower with a higher interest rate. Direct financing is usually done by borrowers that sell securities and/or shares to raise money and circumvent the high interest rate of financial intermediaries (banks). We may regard transactions as direct finance, even when a financial intermediary is included, in case no asset transformation has taken place. An example is a household which buys a newly issued government bond through the services of a broker, when the bond is sold by the broker in its original state. Another good example for direct finance is a business which directly buys newly issued commercial papers from another business entity.

Direct finance is a cornerstone of financial markets, enabling borrowers to connect directly with lenders without intermediaries like banks. This process fosters efficient capital allocation by allowing entities to issue securities, such as stocks and bonds, directly to investors. By bypassing intermediaries, direct finance reduces transaction costs, enhances transparency, and provides a platform for price discovery, where market forces determine the value of securities.

Unlike indirect finance, which relies on financial intermediaries to transform assets, direct finance involves borrowers issuing financial instruments in their original form. For instance, corporations may issue bonds directly to investors, streamlining the funding process while requiring participants to navigate market complexities independently.

Direct finance plays a critical role in enhancing market efficiency and liquidity. By facilitating direct transactions, it reduces reliance on intermediaries and supports transparent financial systems. However, this approach demands robust markets and informed participants to address potential risks, such as defaults. For example, the issuance of government bonds to households or corporate bonds to institutional investors exemplifies direct finance's capacity to generate capital and support economic growth.

In conclusion, direct finance is integral to the functioning of financial markets. It fosters efficiency, transparency, and economic stability by enabling direct connections between savers and borrowers. By minimizing transaction costs and promoting liquidity, direct finance underscores the importance of knowledgeable market participants and well-structured financial markets in shaping economic outcomes.

== See also ==
- Indirect finance
