= University system =

Set of multiple affiliated universities

A university system is a set of multiple affiliated universities and colleges that are usually geographically distributed. Typically, all member universities in a university system share a common component among all of their various names. Usually, all member universities of a university system are governed by a system-wide governing body, such as a board of trustees or a board of regents.

== University systems in different countries ==
In the United States, many states have one or two state university systems under which many of their publicly funded universities are aligned, both in name and in governance. Additionally, for-profit universities, such as DeVry University, often have multiple campuses which share the same name; these may be, but are not always, described as a university system.

In Canada, university system usually refers to the collection of all universities within a jurisdiction, as distinguished from other post-secondary institutions. Used as a point of comparison, it may refer to the universities within a province or within a country. In the UK, university system has been used to refer to the policy and practise of integrated administration and infrastructure of the universities within the country.

In Republic of Ireland, the National University of Ireland is a federal university system comprising constituent universities and recognised colleges. Its constituent universities are University College Cork, University College Dublin, the University of Galway and Maynooth University; its recognised colleges and associated institutions include the Royal College of Surgeons in Ireland and the Institute of Public Administration.

In the Philippines, university system is a title granted by the Commission on Higher Education to a private or public higher education institution after complying certain requirements. The commission defines university system as an organized academic entity composed of separate but interrelated units, at least one of which has university level status. A single governing board is responsible for the formulation of system-wide policies and programs. A university system has its own system administration headed by a chief executive officer. Its function is to coordinate and integrate system-wide functions and activities. Each constituent unit has its own chief executive officer to whom broad powers is delegated by the governing board for the organization and operation of the constituent unit.

In Vietnam, university systems consist of many member institutions, with each institution equivalent to a regular specialized university. Vietnam currently counts 6 university systems, each university system divided into many member universities, member schools or member institutes specializing in training and researching a specific group of disciplines to create their own strengths. The head of a university system is called a president, and the head of a member university is called a rector.

In France, there are two legal statuses for grouping universities together: the collegiate university (which initially had an 'experimental' status, the EPE, before definitively obtaining the status of Grand Établissement', the GE) and the university system (as a COMUE, in French 'Communautés d'Universités et Établissements). The first, the EPE and then the GE, is generally the status adopted by at least two universities that merge to create a new one, very close to the collegiate university model. With the second status, the COMUE, the universities retain their legal autonomy and distinct identities within an association of universities.

== List of university systems ==
=== Asia ===
==== India ====
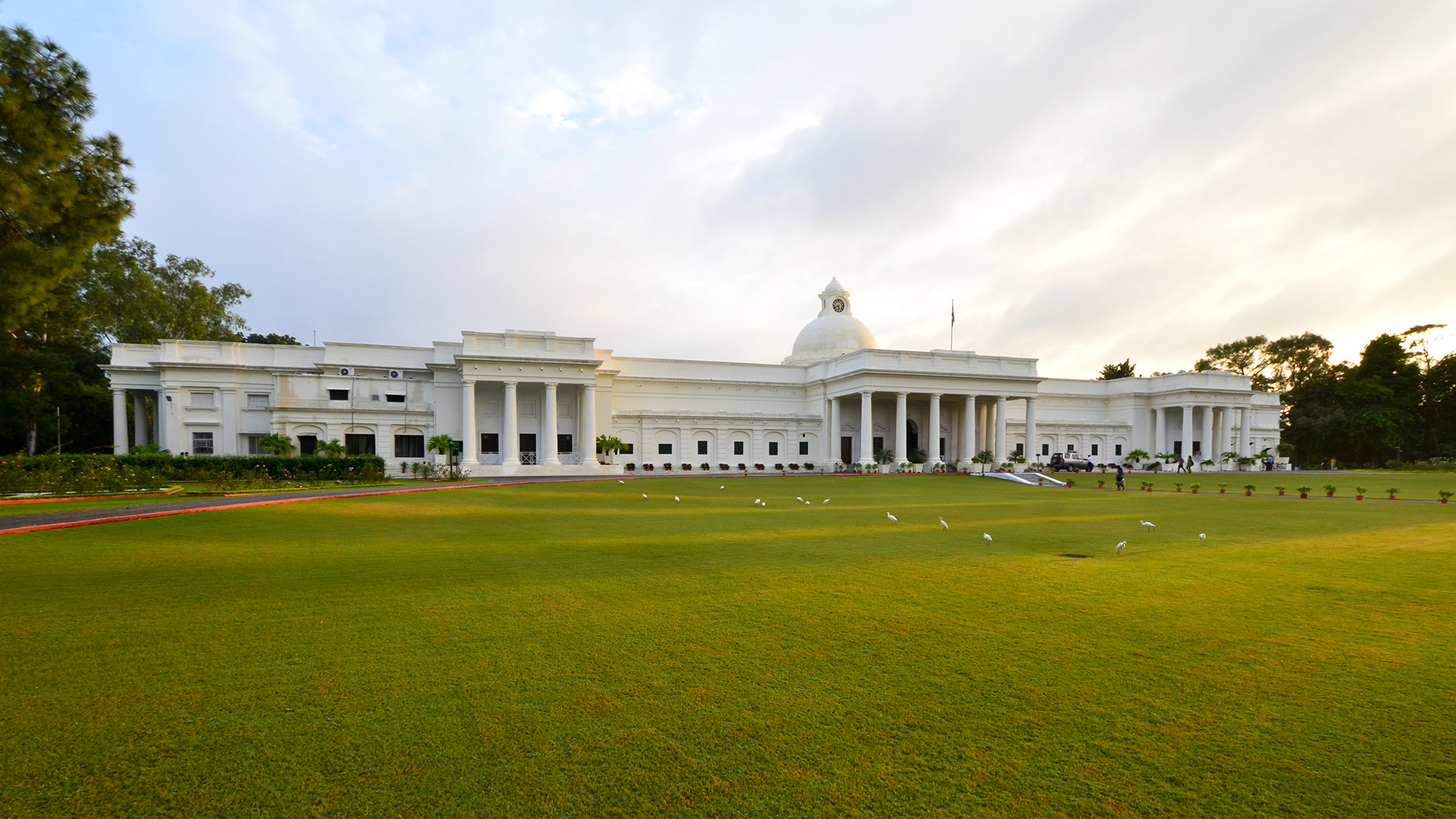
IIT Roorkee, one of 23 Indian Institutes of Technology

- Indian Institutes of Technology A group of 23 public research universities specializing in engineering and sciences.
- National Institutes of Technology A group of 31 public research universities specializing in engineering and sciences.
- Indian Institutes of Management A group of 20 public universities specializing in business and management education.
- Indian Institutes of Science Education and Research A group of 7 public research universities focused on the fundamental and applied sciences.
- All India Institutes of Medical Sciences A group of 19 universities focused on medical education and research.
- National Law universities A group of 23 universities focused on world class legal and judicial education and research

==== Iran ====
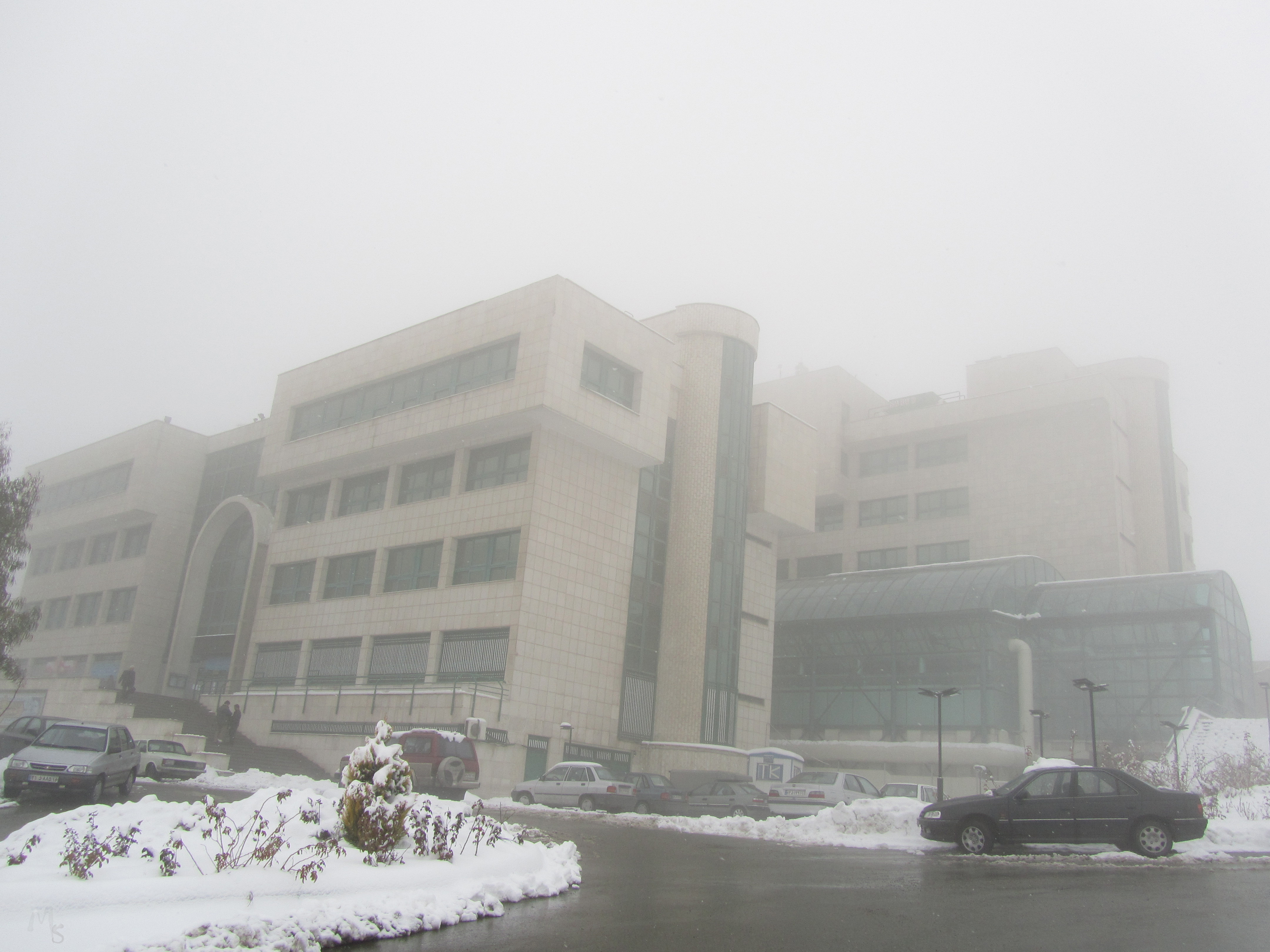
- Science and Research Branch of the Islamic Azad University
  Islamic Azad University (2 independent and 31 state Universities)
- Technical and Vocational University
- University of Applied Science and Technology
- Payame Noor University
- Farhangian University
- Academic Center for Education, Culture and Research

==== Malaysia ====
- Universiti Teknologi MARA System (1 main campus, 4 satellite campuses, 4 autonomous state campuses, 8 state branch campuses, 9 city campuses, 21 affiliated colleges, 1 international campus, 1 training hospital, and 2 training hotels)

==== Philippines ====
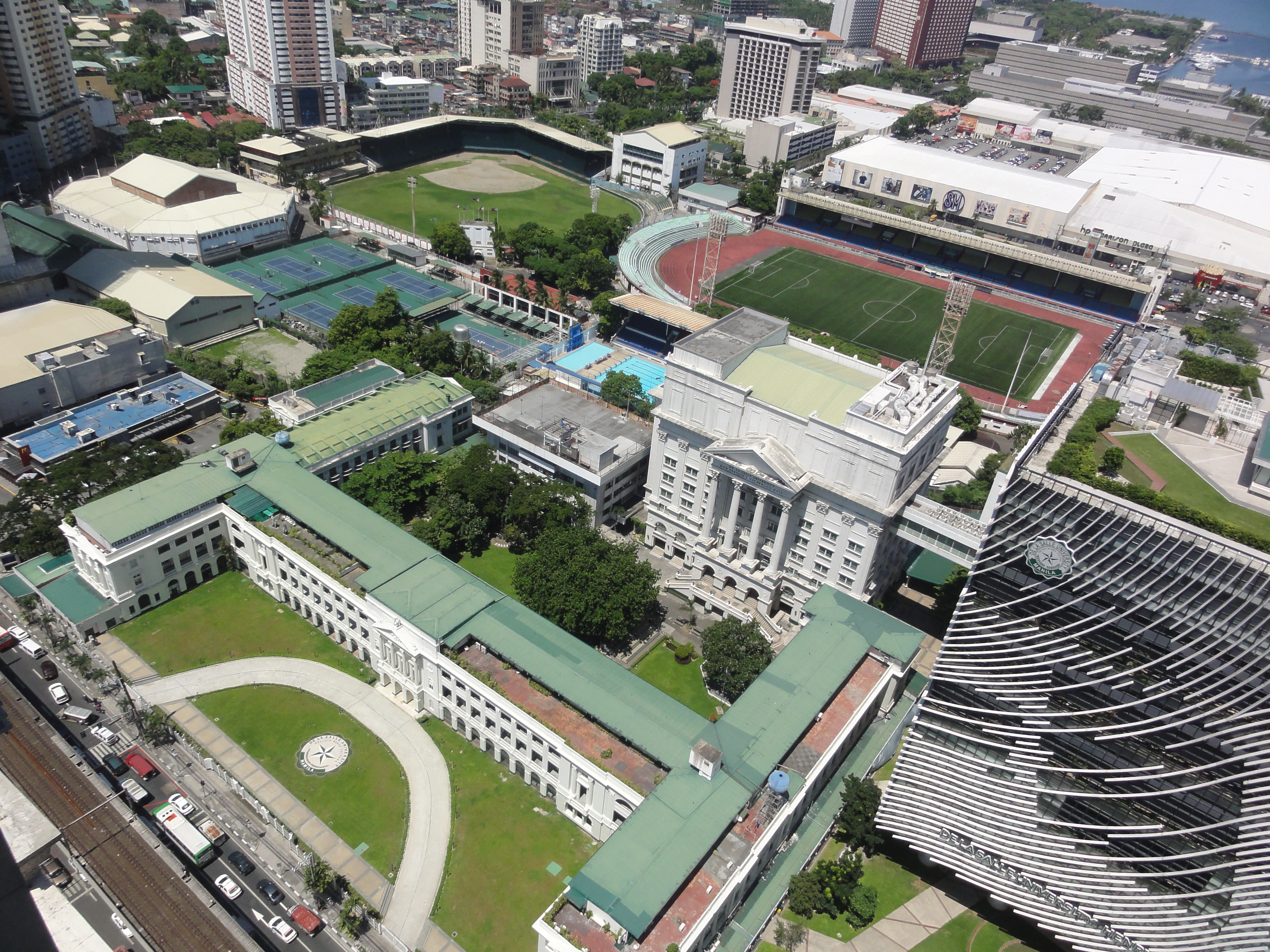
- De La Salle University, the oldest constituent institution of De La Salle Philippines
  De La Salle Philippines (16 campuses)
- Mindanao State University System (8 constituent universities, 3 attached colleges)
- St. Paul University System (7 campuses)
- University of Perpetual Help System (4 DALTA campuses, 5 JONELTA campuses)
- University of the Philippines System (9 constituent universities, with 10 campus locations)
- University of Santo Tomas System (5 campuses)

==== Taiwan ====
- National Taiwan University System (3 campuses)
- University System of Taiwan (4 campuses)
- Taiwan Comprehensive University System (4 campuses)
- University System of Taipei (3 campuses)

==== Thailand ====
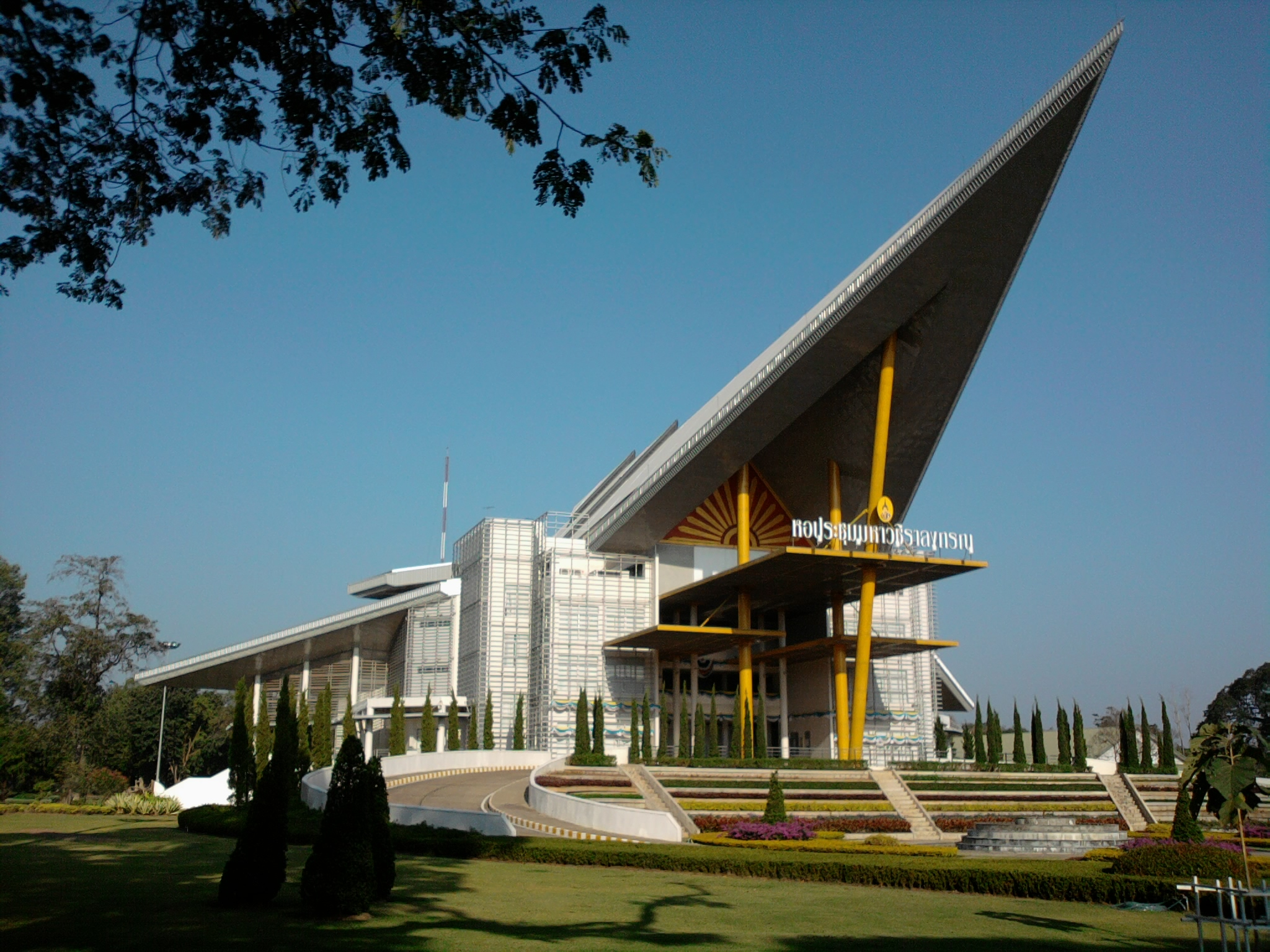
- Sakon Nakhon Rajabhat University is one of 38 universities that comprise the Rajabhat University system
  Rajabhat University system (38 universities)
- Rajamangala University of Technology (9 universities)

==== Vietnam ====
- Vietnam National University, Hanoi (9 universities, 3 schools)
- Vietnam National University, Ho Chi Minh City (8 universities, 1 schools, 1 branch and 1 institute)
- University of Da Nang (6 universities, 2 schools and 1 branch)
- Hue University (8 universities, 3 schools and 1 branch)
- Thai Nguyen University (7 universities, 2 schools and 1 branch)

=== Europe ===
==== France ====
- University of Lyon (4 constituent universities, 8 Grandes Écoles and 9 associated institutions)
- University of Normandy (3 constituent universities)
- University of Toulouse (an alliance of 3 constituent universities and 27 institutes)
- University of Burgundy-Franche-Comté (3 constituent universities and 3 Grandes Écoles)
- Paris-Est Sup University Group (2 constituent universities)
- Angers - Le Mans Community of Universities (2 constituent universities)

==== Greece ====
- State University System of Greece

==== Ireland ====
- National University of Ireland (4 constituent universities, 2 recognised colleges and associated institutions, and 4 colleges linked with constituent universities)

==== United Kingdom ====
England

- University of London (17 constituent colleges)

Scotland

- University of the Highlands and Islands (13 colleges and institutes)

=== South America ===
==== Brazil ====
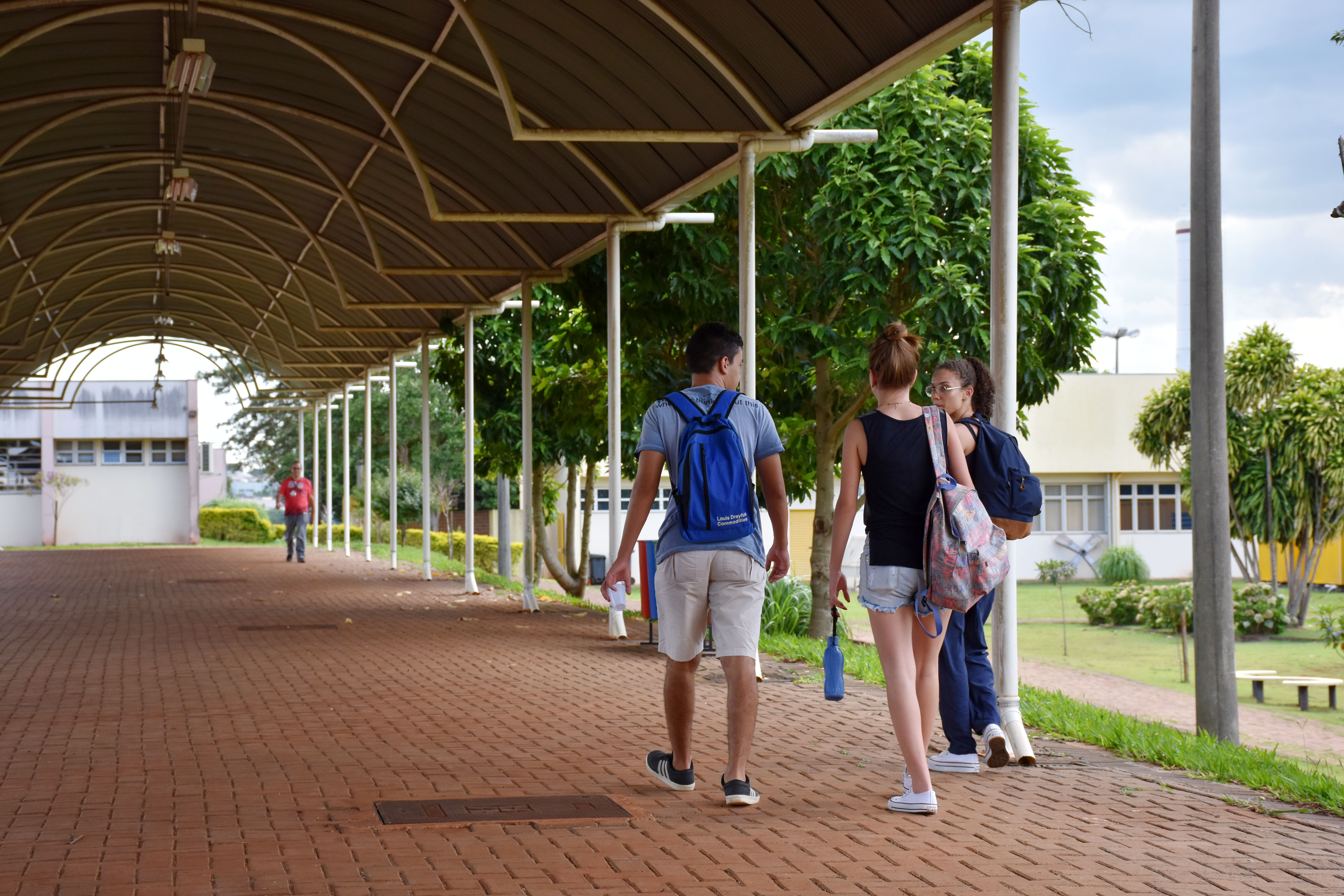
The Apucarana Campus of the Federal University of Technology – Paraná

- Federal University of Technology – Paraná (campuses in 13 cities in the state of Paraná)
- São Paulo State University (campuses in 24 cities in the state of São Paulo)
- Bahia State University (campuses in 24 cities in the state of Bahia)
- State University of Western Paraná (campuses in 5 cities in the state of Paraná)
- Amazonas State University ("campuses" in 19 cities in the state of Amazonas)

=== North America ===
- DeVry University (23 major campuses in the United States and Canada)

==== Canada ====
- Université du Québec (10 universities, schools and institute)
- Canadian Military College system

==== Mexico ====
- Anahuac University Network: a private university system with 8 campuses throughout Mexico, plus some allied institutions located in Spain, Italy, United States, Chile and France.

==== Puerto Rico ====
- Ana G. Méndez University System (5 campuses) It also has 3 sub-systems and a research center. Each of the campuses have off-campus centers that function independently and thus act as individual campuses.
- Interamerican University of Puerto Rico (9 campuses)
- Pontifical Catholic University of Puerto Rico (4 campuses)
- NUC University (6 campuses)
- University of Puerto Rico (11 campuses)

==== United States ====
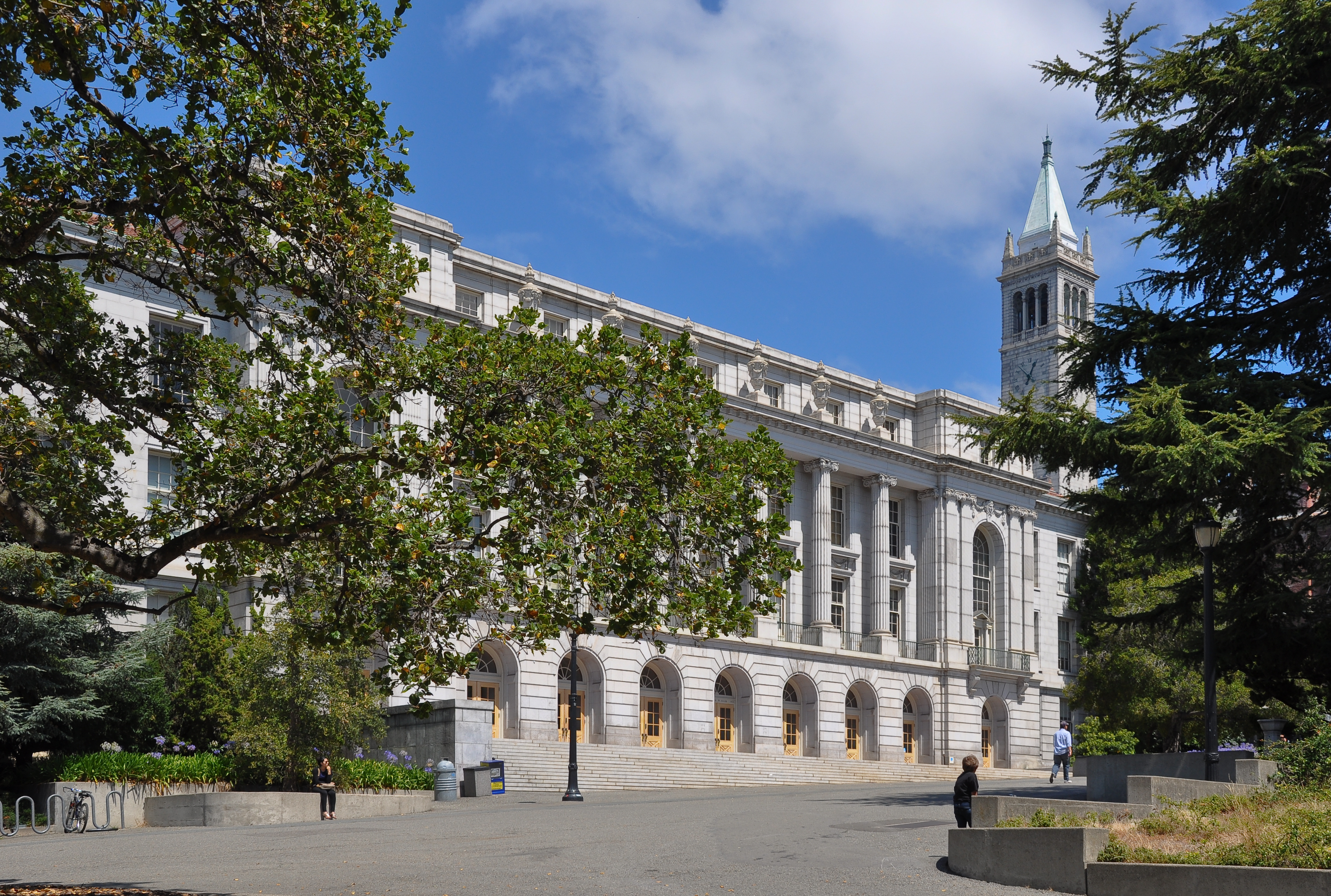
The University of California system is a prestigious public university system

===== State university systems =====
- University of Alabama System (3 campuses)
- Auburn University System (2 campuses)
- University of Alaska System (3 campuses)
- Arizona Board of Regents (3 universities)
- University of Arkansas System (5 universities, 1 medical school, 2 law schools, 1 graduate school for public service, 5 community colleges, 1 division of agriculture)
- Arkansas State University System (10 campuses)
- University of California (10 campuses under direct administration, plus an independently administered law school)
- California State University (23 campuses)
- University of Colorado (4 campuses)
- Colorado State University System (3 campuses)
- Connecticut State Colleges & Universities (CSCU) (17 campuses)
- University of Connecticut (5 campuses)
- State University System of Florida (12 institutions)
- University System of Georgia (26 colleges and universities)
- University of Hawaiʻi System (3 universities and 7 community colleges)
- University of Illinois system (3 institutions)
- Southern Illinois University (2 institutions and multiple campuses)
- Indiana University (9 campuses)
- Purdue University System (5 campuses)
- Louisiana State University System (2 medical schools, 1 law school, 1 dental school, 1 veterinary school) (10 campuses)
- University of Louisiana System (9 campuses)
- Southern University System (5 campuses)
- University of Maine System (7 campuses)
- University System of Maryland (13 campuses)
- University of Massachusetts System (5 campuses)
- University of Michigan (3 campuses)
- University of Minnesota system (5 campuses)
- Minnesota State (30 state colleges, 7 state universities, in total operate 54 campuses)
- University of Missouri System (4 campuses)
- Montana University System (14 campuses)
- University of Nebraska system (4 campuses)
- Nebraska State College System (3 campuses)
- Nevada System of Higher Education (2 universities, one state college, 4 community colleges, and one research institute)
- University System of New Hampshire (4 campuses)
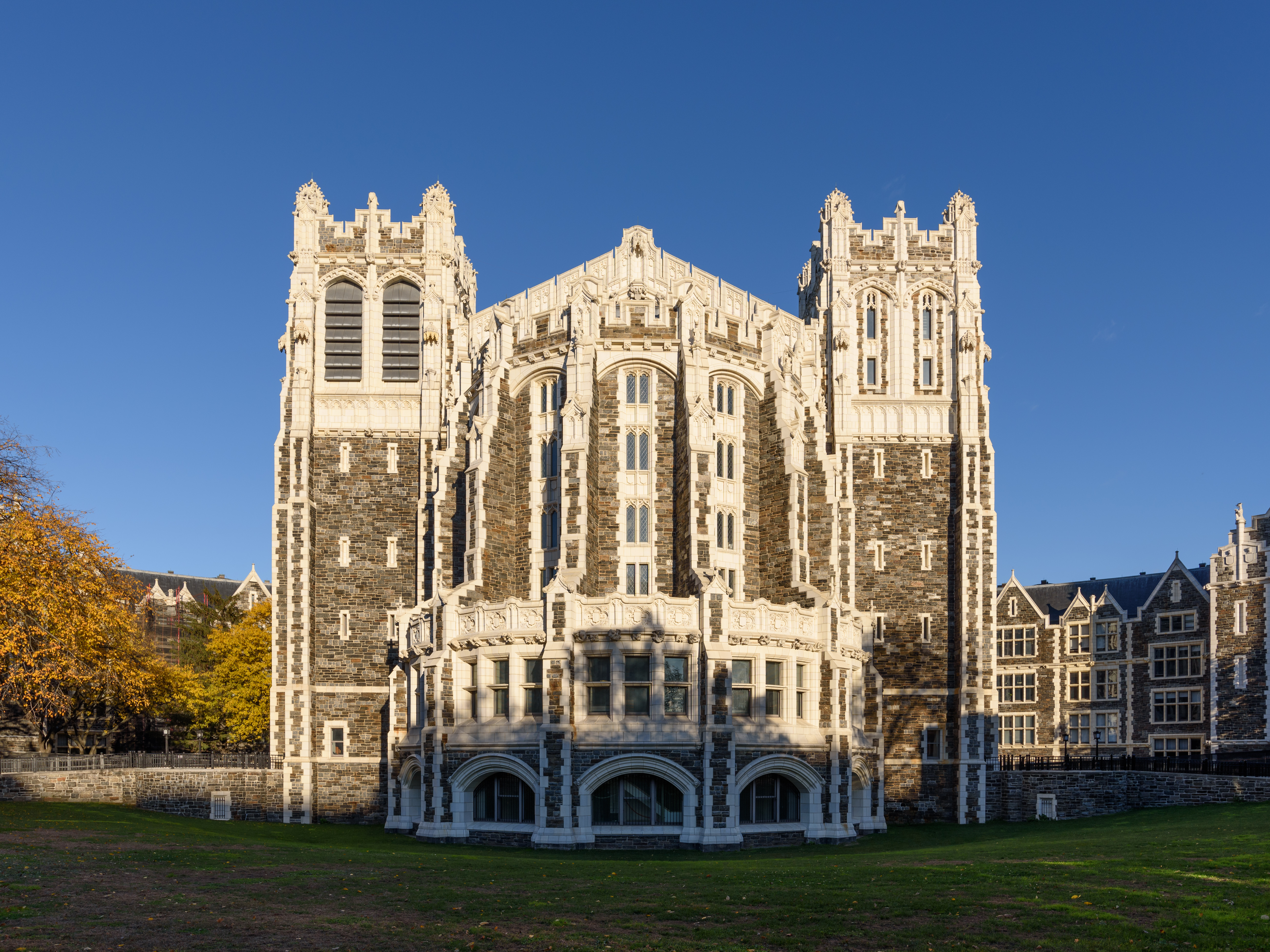
- City College of New York, part of the City University of New York
  City University of New York (24 campuses)
- State University of New York (64 campuses)
- University of North Carolina (16 campuses, plus one affiliated high school)
- North Dakota University System (11 campuses)
- University System of Ohio (13 campuses with 23 2-year institutions)
- Oklahoma State University System (4 university campuses and 2 health centers)
- Regional University System of Oklahoma (RUSO) (6 universities on 12 campuses)
- Oregon University System (7 institutions; defunct)
- Commonwealth System of Higher Education (4 institutions with 33 campuses)
- Pennsylvania State System of Higher Education (14 institutions with 20 campuses)
- University of South Carolina System (8 campuses)
- University of Tennessee system (5 campuses)
- Tennessee Board of Regents (6 universities, 13 community colleges, 26 technology centers)
- University of Houston System (4 institutions and 2 multi-institution teaching centers)
- University of North Texas System (3 institutions)
- University of Texas System (14 institutions)
- Texas A&M University System (11 institutions)
- Texas State University System (7 institutions)
- Texas Tech University System (5 institutions)
- Troy University System (4 campuses, 23 support sites)
- Utah System of Higher Education (16 institutions)
- Vermont State Colleges (5 campuses)
- Virginia Commonwealth University (2 campuses)
- University of Virginia (2 campuses)
- University of Wisconsin System (13 institutions, 26 campuses)

===== Public community college systems =====
Some state university systems in the list above also include community colleges.

- Alabama Community College System (24 community and technical colleges)
- Alamo Colleges District (5 colleges)
- California Community Colleges System (116 campuses)
- Colorado Community College System (13 colleges)
- Connecticut State Community College (12 campuses)
- Florida College System (28 campuses)
- Technical College System of Georgia (22 colleges)
- Illinois Community College System (48 community colleges and one multi-college center)
- Eastern Iowa Community Colleges (3 campuses)
- Ivy Tech Community College of Indiana (23 campuses)
- Kentucky Community and Technical College System (16 campuses)
- Lone Star College System
- Louisiana Community and Technical College System (10 campuses)
- Community College System of New Hampshire (7 colleges)
- North Carolina Community College System (58 colleges)
- Maine Community College System (7 campuses)
- Maricopa County Community College District (11 campuses + 2 skills centers)
- South Carolina Technical College System (16 colleges)
- Virginia Community College System (23 campuses)
- Washington Community and Technical Colleges (34 institutions)
- Wisconsin Technical College System (16 institutions)

===== Military service school systems =====
- Air University
- Army University (170 schools and campuses)
- Marine Corps University

===== Private university systems =====
- American Public University System (2 for-profit online universities)
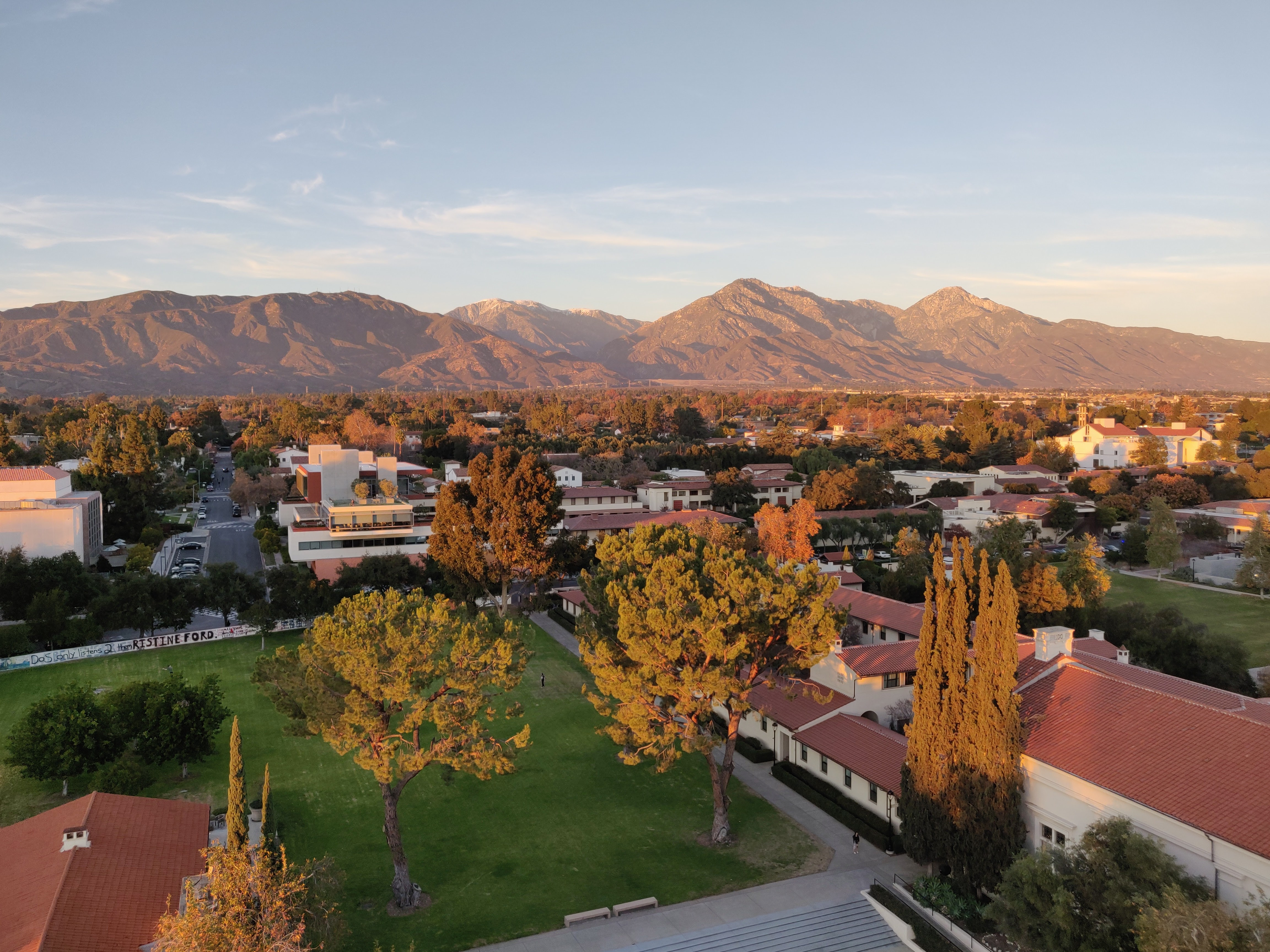
- The Claremont Colleges are an academic consortium of seven independent private institutions, most of which have adjacent campuses
  Claremont Colleges (7 institutions)
- Saint Mary's University of Minnesota (3 campuses)
- Johnson & Wales University (2 campuses around the United States)
- Brigham Young University System (5 institutions—Provo, Hawaii, Idaho, LDS Business College, and online Global Pathways)
- Touro University System (11 undergraduate institutions, 12 graduate schools)

== See also ==
- Affiliating university
- Colleges within universities in the United Kingdom
