= Couperin (consortium) =

Network of French academic institutions dealing with access to scientific publications

COUPERIN (Consortium unifié des établissements universitaires et de recherche pour l'accès aux publications numériques) (English: Unified Consortium of Higher Education and Research Organizations for Access to Digital Publications) is an academic consortium in France. Formed in 1999, it includes more than 250 universities, research organizations, Grandes écoles (schools), COMUE, and others. The consortium negotiates with publishers the prices and conditions of access to scientific publications and other digital resources for the benefit of its members. It promotes open science, particularly with regard to scientific publications, both nationally and internationally. It is headquartered in Paris.

== Members ==
As of 2018, members of the Couperin consortium include the following institutions.

=== Universities ===
- Bordeaux INP
- Centre universitaire de formation et de recherche de Mayotte
- COMUE - Lille Nord de France
- COMUE - Normandie Université
- COMUE - Paris Sciences et Lettres
- COMUE - Sorbonne Universités
- COMUE - Université Bretagne Loire
- COMUE - Université confédérale Léonard de Vinci
- COMUE - Université de Lyon
- COMUE - Université fédérale de Toulouse Midi-Pyrénées
- COMUE - Université Paris Saclay
- COMUE - Université Paris Seine
- Conservatoire national des arts et métiers
- Ecole des hautes études en sciences sociales
- École française d'Athènes
- École française de Rome
- École pratique des hautes études
- Fondation Maison des sciences de l'Homme
- Institut Catholique d'Etudes Supérieures
- Institut Catholique de Paris
- Institut d'Etudes Politiques de Bordeaux (Sciences Po Bordeaux)
- Institut d'Etudes Politiques de Grenoble (Sciences Po Grenoble)
- Institut d'Etudes Politiques de Lyon (Sciences Po Lyon)
- Institut d'Etudes Politiques de Paris (Sciences Po Paris)
- Institut National d'Histoire de l'Art
- Institut national polytechnique de Toulouse
- Institut national supérieur de formation et de recherche pour l'éducation des jeunes handicapés et les enseignements adaptés (Inshea)
- Institut national universitaire Champollion
- Institut supérieur de mécanique de Paris (SupMeca)
- Muséum National d'Histoire Naturelle
- Observatoire de Paris-Meudon
- Pôle universitaire Léonard-de-Vinci
- Université catholique de l'Ouest
- Université catholique de Lyon
- Université Claude Bernard (Lyon I)
- Université Clermont-Auvergne
- Université d'Aix-Marseille
- Université d'Angers
- Université d'Artois
- Université d'Avignon et des Pays de Vaucluse
- Université d'Evry-Val-d'Essonne
- Université d'Orléans
- Université de Bordeaux
- Université de Bourgogne
- Université de Bretagne occidentale
- Université de Bretagne-Sud
- Université de Caen Basse-Normandie
- Université de Cergy-Pontoise
- Université de Corse Pasquale Paoli
- Université de Franche-Comté
- Université de Haute-Alsace
- Université de la Guyane
- Université de la Nouvelle-Calédonie
- Université de la Polynésie Française - Tahiti
- Université de La Réunion
- Université de La Rochelle
- Université de Lille I Sciences et technologies
- Université de Lille II Droit et Santé
- Université de Lille III Sciences humaines et sociales
- Université de Limoges
- Université de Lorraine
- Université de Montpellier
- Université de Nantes
- Université de Nice Sophia Antipolis
- Université de Nimes
- Université de Paris Ouest Nanterre La Défense (Paris X)
- Université de Pau et des Pays de l'Adour
- Université de Perpignan Via Domitia
- Université de Picardie Jules Verne
- Université de Poitiers
- Université de Reims Champagne-Ardenne
- Université de Rennes I
- Université de Rennes II Haute-Bretagne
- Université de Rouen
- Université de Savoie
- Université de Strasbourg
- Université de technologie de Belfort-Montbéliard
- Université de technologie de Compiègne
- Université de technologie de Troyes
- Université de Toulon
- Université de Toulouse I Capitole
- Université de Toulouse Jean Jaurès (Toulouse II le Mirail)
- Université de Valenciennes et du Hainaut-Cambrésis
- Université de Versailles St Quentin en Yvelines
- Université des Antilles
- Université du Havre
- Université du Littoral Côte d'Opale
- Université du Maine
- Université François Rabelais (Tours)
- Université Grenoble Alpes
- Université Jean Monnet Saint-Etienne
- Université Jean Moulin (Lyon III)
- Université Louis Lumière (Lyon II)
- Université Michel de Montaigne (Bordeaux III)
- Université Panthéon-Assas (Paris II)
- Université Panthéon-Sorbonne (Paris I)
- Université Paris Descartes (Paris V)
- Université Paris Diderot (Paris VII)
- Université Paris Est Marne-la-Vallée
- Université Paris XIII Paris Nord
- Université Paris-Sorbonne (Paris IV)
- Université Paul Sabatier (Toulouse III)
- Université Paul Valéry (Montpellier III)
- Université Pierre et Marie Curie (Paris VI)
- Université Sorbonne Nouvelle (Paris III)
- Université Vincennes-Saint Denis (Paris VIII)

=== Research organizations ===
- Agence Nationale de Sécurité des Médicaments et des produits de santé
- Agence nationale de sécurité sanitaire de l'alimentation, de l'environnement et du travail
- Bureau de recherches géologiques et minières
- Centre de coopération internationale en recherche agronomique pour le développement
- Centre national d'études spatiales
- Centre national de la recherche scientifique
- Commissariat à l'énergie atomique
- Eurecom
- IFP Energies nouvelles
- Institut de Physique du Globe de Paris
- Institut de Radioprotection et de Sûreté Nucléaire
- Institut de Recherche en Sciences et Technologies pour l'Environnement et l'Agriculture
- Institut de Recherche et de Documentation en Economie de la Santé
- Institut de recherche et de sécurité pour la prévention des accidents du travail et des maladies professionnelles
- Institut de Recherche pour le Développement
- Institut de Recherches Economiques et Sociales
- Institut Français de Recherche pour l'Exploitation de la Mer
- Institut Français des Sciences et Technologies des Transports, de l'aménagement et des Réseaux
- Institut National de l'Environnement Industriel et des Risques
- Institut national de l'information géographique et forestière
- Institut National de la Recherche Agronomique
- Institut National de la Santé et de la Recherche Médicale
- Institut National de Recherche en Informatique et en Automatique
- Institut Pasteur
- Joint ILL-ESRF Library (Institut Max von Laue-Paul Langevin)
- Laboratoire National de l'Eau et des Milieux Aquatiques
- Laboratoire National de Métrologie et d'Essais
- Office National d'Etudes et de Recherches Aérospatiales - The French Aerospace Lab
- Organisation de Coopération et de Développement Economiques

=== Grandes écoles ===
- Agrocampus Ouest
- AgroParisTech
- Agrosup Dijon
- Arts et Métiers ParisTech
- Audencia Business School
- Bordeaux Sciences Agro (ex Enita Bordeaux)
- Centrale Supelec
- Chimie ParisTech (ex Ecole Nationale Supérieure de Chimie de Paris)
- Ecole centrale de Lille
- Ecole centrale de Lyon
- Ecole centrale de Marseille
- Ecole centrale de Nantes
- Ecole d'Ingénieurs en génie des systèmes industriels
- Ecole de biologie industrielle
- Ecole de management de Normandie
- Ecole des Hautes Etudes Commerciales de Paris
- Ecole des hautes études de santé publique
- Ecole des Mines d'Albi-Carnaux
- Ecole des Mines d'Alès
- Ecole des Mines de Douai
- Ecole des Mines de Saint-Etienne
- Ecole nationale d'ingénieurs de Saint-Etienne
- Ecole nationale de formation agronomique
- Ecole nationale de l'aviation civile
- Ecole nationale des Chartes
- Ecole nationale des Ponts et Chaussées (Ponts ParisTech)
- Ecole nationale des Travaux publics de l'Etat
- Ecole nationale du Génie de l'Eau et de l'Environnement de Strasbourg
- Ecole nationale supérieure d'ingénieurs de Caen
- Ecole nationale supérieure de chimie de Montpellier
- Ecole nationale supérieure de l'électronique et de ses applications
- Ecole Nationale Supérieure de Mécanique et d'Aérotechnique
- Ecole Nationale Supérieure de Mécanique et des Microtechniques
- Ecole nationale supérieure de techniques avancées
- Ecole nationale supérieure de techniques avancées - Bretagne (ex ENSIETA)
- Ecole nationale supérieure des arts et industries textiles
- Ecole nationale supérieure des Mines de Paris (Mines ParisTech)
- Ecole nationale supérieure des sciences de l'information et des bibliothèques
- Ecole nationale vétérinaire d'Alfort
- Ecole navale – Groupe des écoles du Poulmic
- Ecole normale supérieure de Lyon
- Ecole normale supérieure de Paris
- École normale supérieure Paris-Saclay
- Ecole polytechnique
- École Supérieure d'Ingénieur d'Agro-Développement International (ISTOM)
- Ecole supérieure de chimie physique électronique de Lyon
- Ecole Supérieure de Commerce de Paris
- Ecole supérieure de physique et de chimie industrielles
- École supérieure des sciences commerciales d'Angers
- Ecole supérieure des sciences économiques et commerciales
- Ecole Supérieure des Technologies Industrielles Avancées (ESTIA)
- EM LYON Business School
- ESCEM - Ecole de management
- ESIEE Paris
- Grenoble Ecole de Management
- Groupe des Ecoles Nationales d'Economie et Statistique
- Groupe ESA - École supérieure d'agricultures d'Angers
- Groupe ESC Troyes
- IMT Atlantique Bretagne - Pays de Loire
- INSEAD
- Institut agronomique méditerranée de Montpellier
- Institut catholique d'arts et métiers de Nantes
- Institut catholique d'arts et métiers de Toulouse
- Institut National des Sciences Appliquées Centre Val de Loire
- Institut Mines-Télécom Business School
- Institut National des Sciences Appliquées de Lyon
- Institut National des Sciences Appliquées de Rennes
- Institut National des Sciences Appliquées de Rouen
- Institut National des Sciences Appliquées de Strasbourg
- Institut National des Sciences Appliquées de Toulouse
- Institut national du service public
- Institut Polytechnique LaSalle Beauvais
- Institut supérieur d'agriculture Rhône-Alpes
- Institut Supérieur de Commerce
- Institut Supérieur de l'Aéronautique et de l'Espace (ex Supaero)
- Institut Supérieur international du parfum, de la cosmétique et de l'aromatique alimentaire
- Kedge Business School
- Montpellier SupAgro
- Neoma Business School
- Novancia Business School Paris
- ONIRIS - Ecole Nationale Vétérinaire, Agroalimentaire et de l'Alimentation Nantes Atlantique
- SIGMA Clermont
- SKEMA Business school
- Sup'Biotech
- Télécom ParisTech
- Télécom SudParis
- Toulouse Business School
- VetAgro Sup

=== Libraries ===
- Bibliothèque nationale de France
- Bibliothèque nationale et universitaire de Strasbourg
- Bibliothèque universitaire des langues et civilisations

=== Other ===
- American University of Paris
- Assistance publique - Hôpitaux de Marseille
- Assistance publique - Hôpitaux de Paris
- Centre d'études et d'expertise sur les risques, l'environnement, la mobilité et l'aménagement
- Centre d'études et de recherches sur les qualifications
- Centre hospitalier de Cayenne Andrée Rosemon
- Centre hospitalier de Gonesse
- Centre hospitalier de la Côte Basque
- Centre hospitalier régional d'Orléans
- Centre hospitalier régional de Metz Thionville
- Centre hospitalier régional universitaire de Lille
- Centre hospitalier territorial de Nouvelle-Calédonie
- Centre Hospitalier Universitaire de Bordeaux
- Centre hospitalier universitaire de Nice
- Centre hospitalier universitaire de Nîmes
- Centre hospitalier universitaire de Pointe-à-Pitre Abymes
- Centre scientifique et technique du bâtiment
- Cité internationale universitaire de Paris
- Collège de France
- Direction de l'enseignement militaire supérieur - Centre de documentation de l'Ecole militaire
- Groupe hospitalier du Havre
- Groupement hospitalier de territoire Nord-Ouest Vexin Val d'Oise
- Hospices civils de Lyon
- Institut National de Recherche en Archéologie Préventive
- Institut National de Veille Sanitaire
- Institut National du Sport, de l'Expertise et de la Performance
- ISTP France
- Musée du Quai Branly
- Unicancer
- Université catholique de Lille

== See also ==
- Open access in France
