= Paris Lumières University Group =

French association of universities and higher education institutions

Coordinates: 48.9039°N 2.2138°E

Université Paris Lumières was an association of universities and higher education institutions (ComUE) for institutions of higher education, research and culture in the Île-de-France (including Paris) region of France.

The association was created as a ComUE according to the 2013 Law on Higher Education and Research (France), effective 29 December 2014. The association disappears in 2024.

== Members ==
Founding members of Université Paris Lumières are:

- Paris Nanterre University
- University of Paris 8 Vincennes-Saint-Denis
- Centre national de la recherche scientifique (CNRS)

The ComUE also has thirteen associate members:

- Archives nationales (France)
- Bibliothèque nationale de France
- CEDIAS - Musée social
- Centre Pompidou
- Collège international de philosophie
- Crédit municipal de Paris
- Louis Lumière College
- INA - Institut national de l'audiovisuel
- INS-HEA
- La maison des cultures du Monde
- Cité nationale de l'histoire de l'immigration
- Musée du quai Branly
- Pôle Sup'93

== See also ==
- Institut national supérieur de formation et de recherche pour l'éducation des jeunes handicapés et les enseignements adaptés
