= Pierre Rosenthal =

French role-playing game designer and author (1961–2026)

- Rosenthal in 2018
- Born: 8 March 1961
- Died: 4 November 2026 (aged 65)
- Education: École nationale supérieure d'ingénieurs de Caen
- Occupations: Game designer and author

Pierre Rosenthal (French: [pjˈɛʁ ʁozɑ̃tˈal]; 8 March 1961 – 4 November 2026) was a French role-playing game designer and author. He invented the French term rôliste (role-playing game player), and registered its trademark to ensure it could never be used for commercial gain.

== Biography ==
Reading the magazine Métal Hurlant at age 15, Rosenthal learned about the fantasy role-playing game Dungeons & Dragons, but he did not play his first game until several years later. He submitted comics to the magazine while still in prep school. While attending classes at the École nationale supérieure d'ingénieurs de Caen in the late 1970s, he became a science fiction columnist for Métal Hurlant.

Rosenthal graduated in 1981, and three years later, submitted a role-playing scenario to the French games magazine Casus Belli. This marked the beginning of his collaboration with the magazine; he became deputy editor, and for special issues, he was editor-in-chief.

== Author ==
In 1986, Rosenthal self-published the role-playing game SimulacreS, a rules-light game with a generic setting. Rosenthal noted that it "was designed with three objectives: to allow for an introduction to role-playing, to allow for quick gameplay, and to discover new settings."

The same year, Rosenthal set a version of the rules in the world of the comic book series Les Aventures d'Alef-Thau; it was enclosed in one of the comics, La Roi bourgne (The One-Eyed King) as a booklet titled La Fleur de l'Asiamar (The Flower of Asiamar). In 1988, Casus Belli published the game rules for SimulacreS in a special edition.

Between 1987 and 1988, Rosenthal wrote four interactive adventures for a paperback series called the Bob Morane Magazine, as well as four adventure gamebooks.

In 1989 Rosethal created the science fiction role-playing game Athanor, la terre des mille mondes (Athanor, the land of a thousand worlds). A few scenarios for the game appeared in Casus Belli.

== "Rôliste" ==
Rosenthal invented the term "rôliste" in the early 1990s to describe players of role-playing games. Worried that some company would attempt to trademark the term for commercial gain, he registered the term with the National Institute of Industrial Property, then authorized the use of the term freely. The word rôliste entered the French dictionaries Le Petit Robert and Larousse in 2017.

== Translator ==
After the publication of the collectible card game Magic: The Gathering, Rosenthal worked with the game publishers Wizards of the Coast from 1994 to 2001 to translate the never-ending supply of new cards into French.

Rosenthal then moved to Ubisoft to work on debugging and translating the massively multiplayer online role-playing game Everquest to French.

From 2004 to 2021, he worked for Blizzard Entertainment. He also partially corrected the French translation of World of Warcraft before its release.

== Death ==
Rosenthal died due to heart problems on 4 November 2026, at the age of 65.

== Games ==
- SimulacreS (1986)
- Athanor (1989)
- Capitaine Vaudou (1991)

== Gamebooks ==
- Perceval le Gallois (1987)
- Les Combattants de l'ombre (1987)
- Le Prisonnier (1988)
- Empire : une entreprise impitoyable dont vous êtes le p.-d.-g. (1988)
