= Autonomous university =

University high degree of autonomy from the state

Autonomous university typically refers to a university that exercises a high degree of autonomy from the state. The main dimensions of university autonomy are academic, organizational, financial and staffing autonomy.

The 1988 Magna Charta Universitatum defines the first fundamental principle of a university to be an "autonomous institution" whose "research and teaching must be morally and intellectually independent of all political authority and economic power". Different countries have their own implementation of university autonomy.

== By country ==
=== China ===
In 2011, the Southern University of Science and Technology launched in Shenzhen, Guangdong. It was marketed as China's first "autonomous" university, though the level of autonomy from state institutions is disputed.

=== Latin America ===
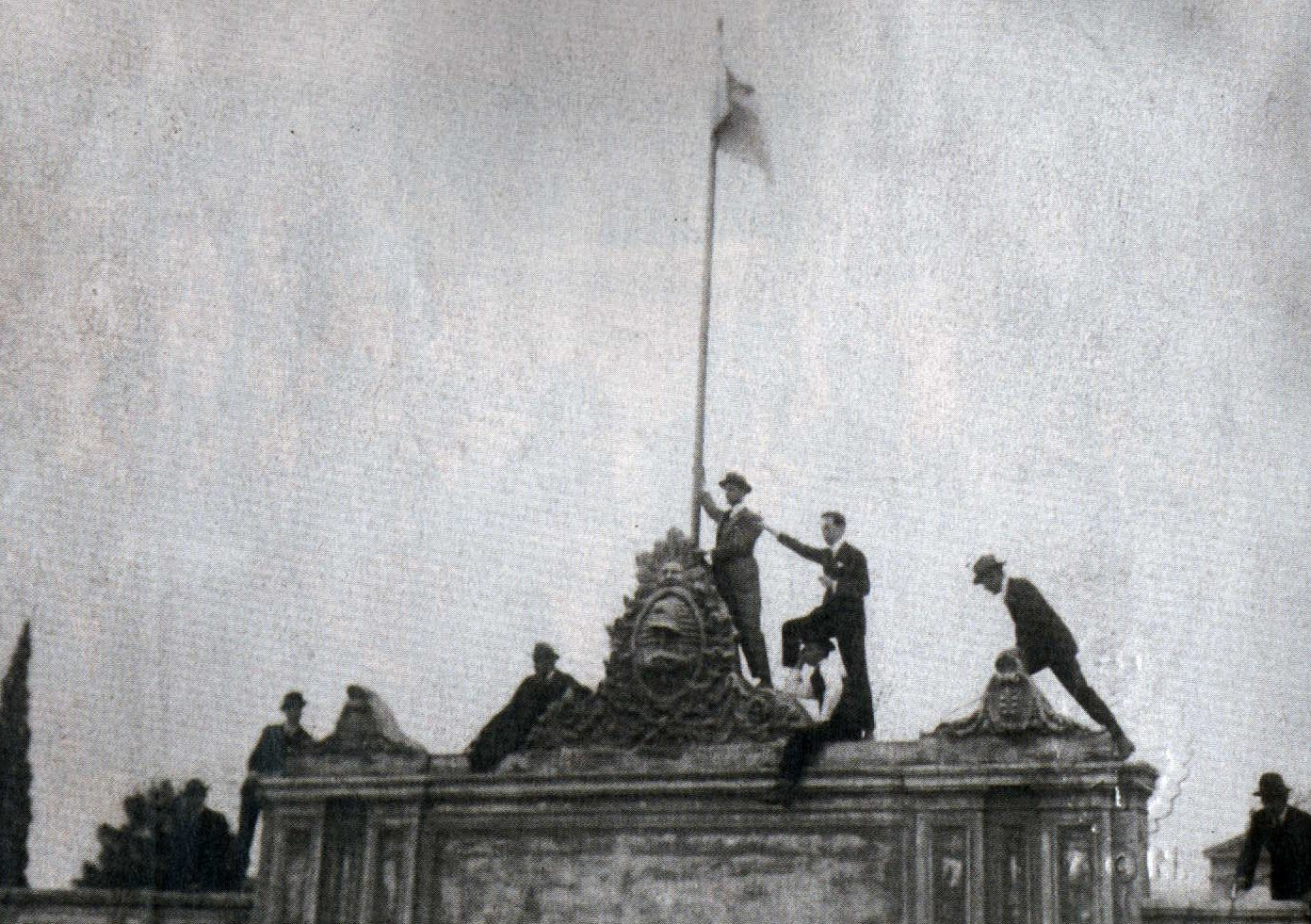
Students raise the flag of Argentina at the National University of Córdoba

Many Latin American countries and their universities have been affected by authoritarian dictatorships. Student revolts starting from the National University of Córdoba in Argentina through to Mexico, expanded the concept of university autonomy in many of these countries, where it is often constitutionally guaranteed.

These include Argentina, Bolivia, Chile, Colombia, Costa Rica, Dominican Republic, El Salvador, Guatemala, Honduras, Mexico, Nicaragua, Panama, Peru and Venezuela.

=== Portugal ===
The Autonomous University of Lisbon is the first private university in Portugal.

=== Singapore ===
In Singapore, autonomous universities are universities that are publicly funded but are autonomous from the state. All public universities in Singapore are autonomous.

=== Spain ===
In Spain, autonomy is guaranteed to universities under Section 27 of the Spanish Constitution, which states that the "autonomy of Universities is recognized, under the terms established by the law."

== See also ==
- Virtual university
- Private university
- University reform
- Argentine university reform of 1918
