= Svetlana Mintova =

Zeolite scientist

Mintova in 2022

Svetlana Mintova is a chemist, materials scientist, and nanoscientist whose research involves the preparation of zeolites and related porous materials at the nanoscale, and their applications including catalysis, sorption, biomedicine, and optics. Educated in Bulgaria, she works in France and China as a director of research (exceptional class) for the French National Centre for Scientific Research (CNRS) and head of the Center for Zeolites and Nanoporous Materials at Normandy University in Caen, as research director for the Sino-French International Laboratory on Zeolites, and as an invited professor at the China University of Petroleum in Qingdao.

== Education and career ==
Mintova worked as a researcher for the Bulgarian Academy of Sciences in Sofia from 1985 to 1998. She received a Ph.D. from the Technical University, Sofia in 1992, and made postdoctoral research visits to the Luleå University of Technology in Sweden in 1996–1997 and Purdue University in the United States in 1997–1999.

From 1999 to 2005 she worked as a docent in physical chemistry at LMU Munich in Germany. She joined CNRS as a research scientist in 2006, initially affiliated with the Laboratory of Materials with Controlled Porosity at the University of Upper Alcase, where she received a habilitation in 2007. In 2009 she was promoted to director of research, and moved to the Laboratory of Catalysis and Spectrochemistry at Normandy University. She became head of the Center for Zeolites and Nanoporous Materials in 2021.

== Recognition ==
Mintova and her coauthor Valentin Valtchev were the inaugural recipients of the Crønstedt Award of the Federation of European Zeolite Associations, in 2014, and the 2016 recipients of the Donald W. Breck Award of the International Zeolite Association. Mintova received the research prize in chemistry of La Recherche magazine in 2016.

She was named as a knight in the Ordre national du Mérite in 2015, and elected to Academia Europaea in 2025.
