= Reform =

Improvement of what is wrong or corrupt

Reform refers to the improvement or amendment of what is wrong, corrupt, unsatisfactory, etc. The modern usage of the word emerged in the late 18th century and is believed to have originated from Christopher Wyvill's Association movement, which identified "Parliamentary Reform" as its primary aim. Reform is generally regarded as antithetical to revolution.

Developing countries may implement a range of reforms to improve living standards, often with support from international financial institutions and aid agencies. This can involve reforms to macroeconomic policy, the civil service, and public financial management.

In politics, there is debate over what constitutes reform vs. revolution, and whether all changes labeled "reform" actually represent progress. For example, in the United States, proponents of term limits or rotation in office consider it a revolutionary method (advocated as early as the Articles of Confederation) for rooting out government corruption by altering basic political connections between incumbents and constituents. (Note: On term limits reform, see U.S. Term Limits. On more radical/revolutionary changes, including term limits, see, e.g., Robert Struble Jr., Treatise on Twelve Lights: To Restore America the Beautiful under God and the Written Constitution, 2007–08 edition.) Opponents say that congressional term limits can create perverse incentives, and hinder reform, by taking power away from voters and encouraging "revolving door" politics.

A government's ability to implement reforms, referred to as its state capacity, is constrained by the prevailing political system.

== Re-form ==
When used to describe something which is physically formed again, such as re-casting (moulding) or a band that gets back together, the proper term is re-form (with a hyphen), not "reform".

== See also ==
- Catalytic reforming
- Education reform
- Electoral reform
- Land reform
- Microeconomic reform
- Monetary reform
- Progressivism
- Reform (Religion)
- La Reforma
- Reformism
- Security sector governance and reform
- Tax reform
- University reform
- Wall Street reform
