= Leonardo da Vinci University Group =

Leonardo da Vinci consolidated University (French: Université confédérale Léonard de Vinci) is the association of universities and higher education institutions (ComUE) for institutions of higher education and research in the French regions of Centre-Val de Loire and part of the Nouvelle-Aquitaine.

The university was created as a ComUE according to the 2013 Law on Higher Education and Research (France), effective 13 July 2015. Its creation effected a merger between the previously organized associations Centre-Val de Loire University and Limousin Poitou-Charentes Association of Universities.

== Members ==
The ComUE brings together the following institutions:

- University of Limoges
- University of Orléans
- University of Poitiers
- François Rabelais University (Tours)
- École nationale supérieure de mécanique et d'aérotechnique
- INSA Centre Val de Loire
