= Romain Garnier =

French linguist and writer (born 1976)

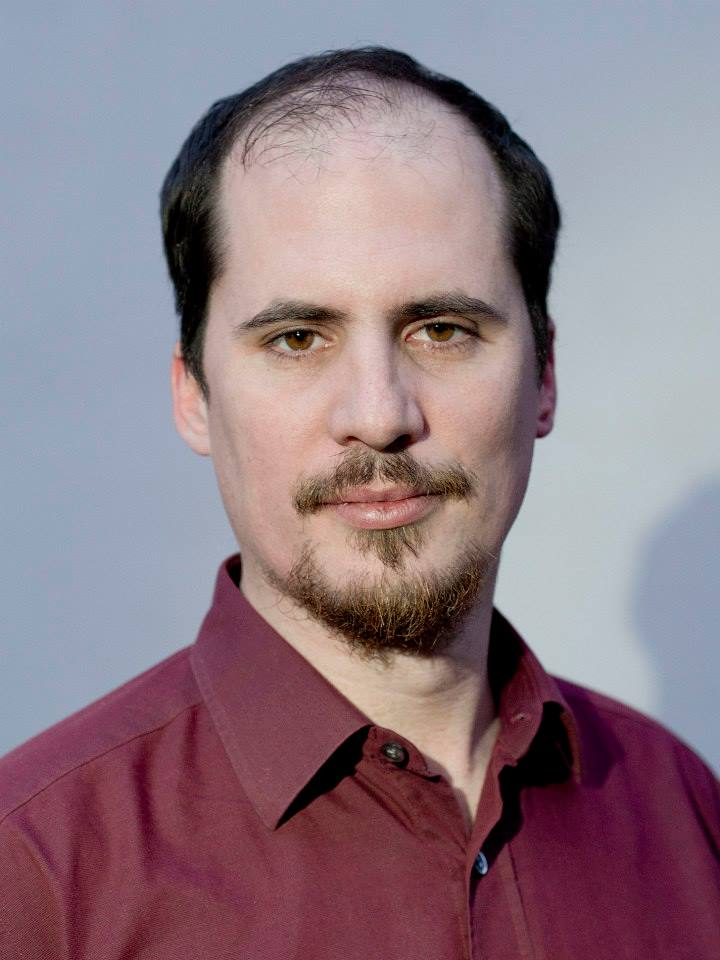
- Born: 30 December 1976 (age 49); Toulon, France

Academic background
- Academic advisors: Charles de Lamberterie, Georges-Jean Pinault

Romain Garnier (born 1976) is a French linguist who specializes in Latin, Greek, Lydian language and Indo-European linguistics. He has been an Assistant Professor (Maître de Conférences) since 2005 at the University of Limoges. He was the recipient of the Prix Émile Benveniste awarded in 2010 by the Académie des Inscriptions et Belles-Lettres, and became a member of the Institut Universitaire de France in 2013.

== Life and career ==
He has authored more than 50 articles and two books on Indo-European linguistics. His main contributions concern the etymology, phonology and morphology of Proto-Indo-European and Indo-European languages, especially Latin and Greek. His book on the Latin verbal system was favorably received, as shown by positive reviews by the American linguist Andrew Miles Byrd (University of Kentucky) in Kratylos^{,}^{[N 1]} and by the French linguist Jean-Paul Brachet (Paris-Sorbonne University) in the Bulletin de la Société de Linguistique de Paris.

He was invited in 2015 by the French popular science journal La Recherche to represent the point of view of linguists on the Indo-European theory in a debate with the French archeologist Jean-Paul Demoule, following the publication of a book in which the latter expresses skepticism about the Indo-European hypothesis.

He also published two novels in French, in 2010 and 2017. A Czech translation of his first novel, L'Héritage de Glace, was published in 2012.

Along with linguist Xavier Delamarre, he is the founding editor of the French academic journal Wékwos dedicated to Indo-European studies (founded in 2014).

== Books ==
Academic:

- 2004. Thèmes grecs, Ophrys, 224 pages (book written with Lucien Pernée) ISBN 9782708010895
- 2008. Textes épiques sanskrits, Ophrys, 225 pages ISBN 9782708011571
- 2010. Sur le vocalisme radical du verbe Latin, Innsbrucker Beiträge zur Sprachwissenschaft, Innsbruck, 134, 519 pages ISBN 9783851247206
- 2017. La Dérivation inverse en latin, Innsbrucker Beiträge zur Sprachwissenschaft, Innsbruck, 157, 524 pages ISBN 9783851247442
- 2017. Scripta Selecta, Les Cent Chemins, Paris, 547 pages ISBN 9781546869368

Novels:

- 2010 L'Héritage de Glace, Paris, Plon. ISBN 9782259211192.
- 2012 Mrazivé dědictví, Prague, PLUS ISBN 9788025901274 (Czech translation of L'Héritage de Glace)
- 2017 L'encre et la chair, Paris, Les Cent Chemins ISBN 9781546869443 (Follow-up to L'Héritage de Glace)

Essays:

- 2012 De Gaulle campagne algérienne, Éditions Elytel, Paris, co-authored with Pierre Jaylet ISBN 9782917182048
- 2014 Oradour-sur-Glane : autopsie d’un massacre, Éditions Elytel, Paris ISBN 9782917182086

== Notes ==
1.For instance, Andrew Byrd states in his review that "G[arnier] has done an admirably thorough job in his analysis of the Latin verbal system and has successfully convinced me that "(i)l y a en latin tout un vaste héritage fort archaïque que ne reflète pas du tout la doctrine reçue, telle qu'elle fut professée par les fondateurs de la discipline indo-européenne, et où l'on tient le latin pour une langue innovante" [… that Latin displays a vast amount of archaic inherited data, which is very different from what is usually said, following the teachings of the founders of Indo-European studies who viewed Latin as an innovative language]."
