= François Pairault =

French historian

François Pairault, born in 1940, is a French historian.

== Biography ==
=== Education ===
François Pairault received his doctorate of history in 1989.

=== Career ===
He is a specialist of political and social history of Bonapartism. He is also the honorary master of conferences in contemporary history at the University of Limoges.

He devoted several years to the study of unpublished archives conserved by the descendants of Gaspard Monge, founder of the École polytechnique.

Pairault is a member of the Academy of Angoumois.

He also served for many years as an elected representative of the city of Angoulême (Charente), where he served as Deputy Mayor in charge of culture.

He has also been published in several historical works, notably on the history of the region of Poitou-Charentes during the First World War.

=== Family ===
He is the father of Louis-Gilles Pairault.

== Works ==
- Regnaud de Saint-Jean-d'Angély ou la fidélité à l'Empereur (1760-1819), Saintes, Le Croît Vif, 2016.
- Maires courage de La Rochelle (en coll.), Saintes, Le Croît Vif, 2014.
- Un amour allemand, La Crèche, Geste éditions, 2011.
- Saint-Jean d'Angély des origines à nos jours, Bordessoules, 2010.
- Les Poilus en image (1914-1918)s, La Crèche, Geste éditions, 2008.
- Madame Monge, comtesse de Péluse (1747-1846), Les Amis de l'Ardenne, 2006.
- Monsieur le Baron : Eugène Eschassériaux, éminence grise du bonapartisme, 1823-1906, préface de René Rémond, Paris, Le Croît vif, 2004 (ouvrage couronné en 2005 par le Grand Prix du Bonapartisme décerné par le Centre d'Études et de Recherche sur le Bonapartisme).
- Bon souvenir des colonies, Paris, Tallandier, 2003.
- Images de Poilus : la Grande Guerre en cartes postales, Paris, Tallandier, 2002.
- La Charente, 1900-1920, Clermont-Ferrand, De Borée, 2002.
- Gaspard Monge, le fondateur de Polytechnique, Paris, Tallandier, 2000.
- Mémoires d'un grand notable bonapartiste : le baron Eugène Eschassériaux (1823-1906), Pons, Université francophone d'été Saintonge-Québec, 2000.
- L'Europe de la préhistoire à nos jours (en coll.), Horvath, 1991.
- La Charente autrefois, Le Coteau, Horvath, 1990, rééd. 1994.
- La Charente de la préhistoire à nos jours (en coll.), Bordessoules, 1986.
