= University of Champagne =

University Profile

The University of Champagne (Université de Champagne) was the association of universities and higher education institutions (ComUE) combining higher education and research in the French region of Champagne-Ardenne.

The university was created as a ComUE according to the 2013 Law on Higher Education and Research (France), effective May 19, 2015. It replaced, in part, a previous grouping (PRES) known as l'« Université fédérale européenne Champagne Ardenne Picardie ». It was dissolved in the end of 2017.

== Members ==
The University of Champagne brings together the following institutions:

- University of Reims Champagne-Ardenne,
- University of Technology of Troyes,
- Groupe École supérieure de commerce de Troyes,
- EPF - École d'ingénieurs,
- ESAD de Reims,
- Arts et Métiers ParisTech,
- Institut régional du travail social of Champagne-Ardenne .
