= Normandy University Group =

Normandy University (Normandie université) is the association of universities and higher education institutions (ComUE) for institutions of higher education and research in the French region of Normandy.

The university was created as a ComUE according to the 2013 Law on Higher Education and Research (France), effective 29 December 2014.

== Members ==
Normandy University brings together the following institutions:

- University of Caen Lower Normandy
- University of Rouen
- University of Le Havre
- Institut national des sciences appliquées de Rouen
- École de management de Normandie
- École nationale supérieure d'ingénieurs de Caen
- École nationale supérieure d'architecture de Normandie
- XL-Chem Graduate School of Research
