= University reform =

Type of education reform

University reform is a type of education reform applied to higher education.

Examples include:

- Bologna Process
- Chilean university reform
- Reform of French universities
  - Law on Higher Education and Research (2007)
  - Liberties and Responsibilities of Universities (2013)
- Norwegian university college reform
- University Reform (Turkey)

== Historic ==
- Argentine university reform of 1918
- Oxford University Act 1854

== See also ==
- Higher education accreditation
