= Louis Pérouas =

French historian

Louis Pérouas (9 September 1923, in Rennes – February 2011, in Limoges) was a French historian, a specialist in the history of the French Catholic Church.

Ordained a priest in 1949, he became a missionary of the Society of Mary. He pursued postgraduate studies in history at the University of Lille and joined the CNRS in 1962 as a researcher and then research director working in Limoges in connection with the Department of History of the University of Limoges.

== Main works and publications ==
- 1964: Le diocèse de La Rochelle de 1648 à 1724, sociologie et pastorale, SEVPEN, 532 pages
- 1985: Refus d'une religion, religion d'un refus, en Limousin rural, 1880-1940, Éd de l'École des hautes études en sciences sociales
- 1988: La Révolution française, une rupture dans le christianisme ?, le cas du Limousin, 1775-1822, Éd Les Monédières
- 1989: Grignion de Montfort et la Vendée, Éditions du Cerf
- 1993: Une religion des Limousins ? approches historiques, L'Harmattan
- 1994: Histoire religieuse des Creusois, Société des sciences naturelles et archéologiques de la Creuse
- 1996: Claude et ses frères, Éd Don Bosco
- 1996: Prêtres ouvriers à Limoges : des trajectoires constratées, L'Harmattan
- 2002: Culte des saints et anticléricalisme : entre statistiques et culture populaire, Musée du Pays d'Ussel
- 2003: L'Église au prisme de l'histoire : regards sur un demi-siècle de recherches et d'engagements, L'Harmattan
- 2005: Lettre ouverte à des amis francs-maçons, Éd Les Monédières
