= Cherno Omar Barry =

Gambian civil servant and academic

- Awards: Legion of Honour (2018)

Academic background
- Education: PhD in Education and Literature
- Alma mater: University of Limoges; Saint Mary's University; Center for Applied Linguistics; The Gambia College; Armitage High School

Cherno Omar Barry is the current Vice-Chancellor of the International Open University, president of the Writers Association of The Gambia (WAG), former executive secretary at the National Human Rights Commission and permanent secretary in several Gambian ministries.

== Literary works ==
- Barry, Cherno Omar (2016). Lenrie Peters: Trailblazer of Gambian Literature. Global Hands. ISBN 978-0995646049.
- Barry, Cherno Omar, Jean-Marie Grassin, and Jean-Dominique Pénel. L'école et la littérature en Gambie. S.l.): [s.n.), 2002.
- Barry, Cherno Omar. La représentation de l'école dans la littérature gambienne: mémoire présenté en vue de la Maîtrise-ès-Lettres (Mention Littérature Comparée). 2001.
- Barry, Cherno O, Jean-Marie Grassin, and Jean-Dominique Pénel. La Représentation De L'école Dans La Littérature Gambienne. S.l.: s.n., 2001. Print.

== Awards ==
- Legion of Honour (2018)
- Médaille d’Or de la Fondation Alliance Francaise
- Prix Aminata Maiga Ka de la Nouvelle
