= Burgundy - Franche-Comté University Group =

Coordinates: 47.1918°N 5.0229°E

University Burgundy Franche-Comté (Université Bourgogne Franche-Comté) is the association of universities and higher education institutions (ComUE) for institutions of higher education and research in the French region of Bourgogne-Franche-Comté. Its headquarters are in Besançon.

The university was created as a ComUE according to the 2013 Law on Higher Education and Research (France), effective 1 April 2015.

== Members ==
University of Burgundy - Franche-Comté brings together the following institutions:

- University of Burgundy;
- University of Franche-Comté;
- Université de technologie de Belfort-Montbéliard;
- École nationale supérieure de mécanique et des microtechniques;
- AgroSup Dijon
- Burgundy School of Business.
