= University of Limoges =

University in Limoges, France

Coordinates: 45.8264°N 1.2583°E

- Université de Limoges
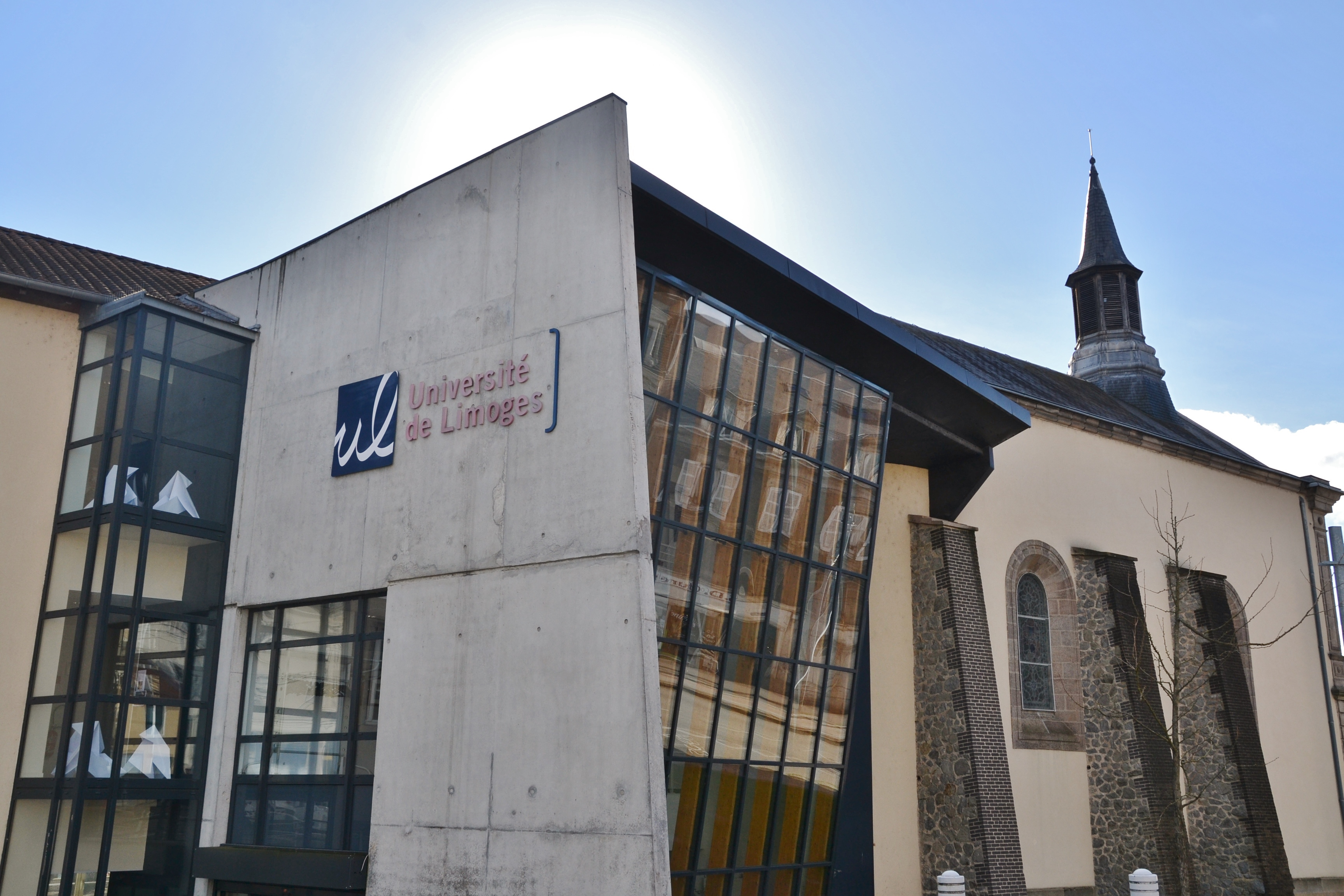
- Administration portal
- Type: Public
- Established: 1968
- Affiliations: Leonardo da Vinci consolidated University, European University Association, Couperin (consortium)
- Chancellor: Luc Johann; Rector of the Academy of Limoges
- President: Alain Célérier
- Academic staff: 1200
- Administrative staff: 538
- Students: 16,548
- Location: 33 rue François Mitterrand, BP 23204, Limoges, France
- Campus: Vanteaux, La Borie, Turgot, Forum, Marcland, Ester Technopôle, Guéret, Ahun, La Souterraine, Tulle, Brive, Neuvic, Égletons, Meymac
- Website: www.unilim.fr
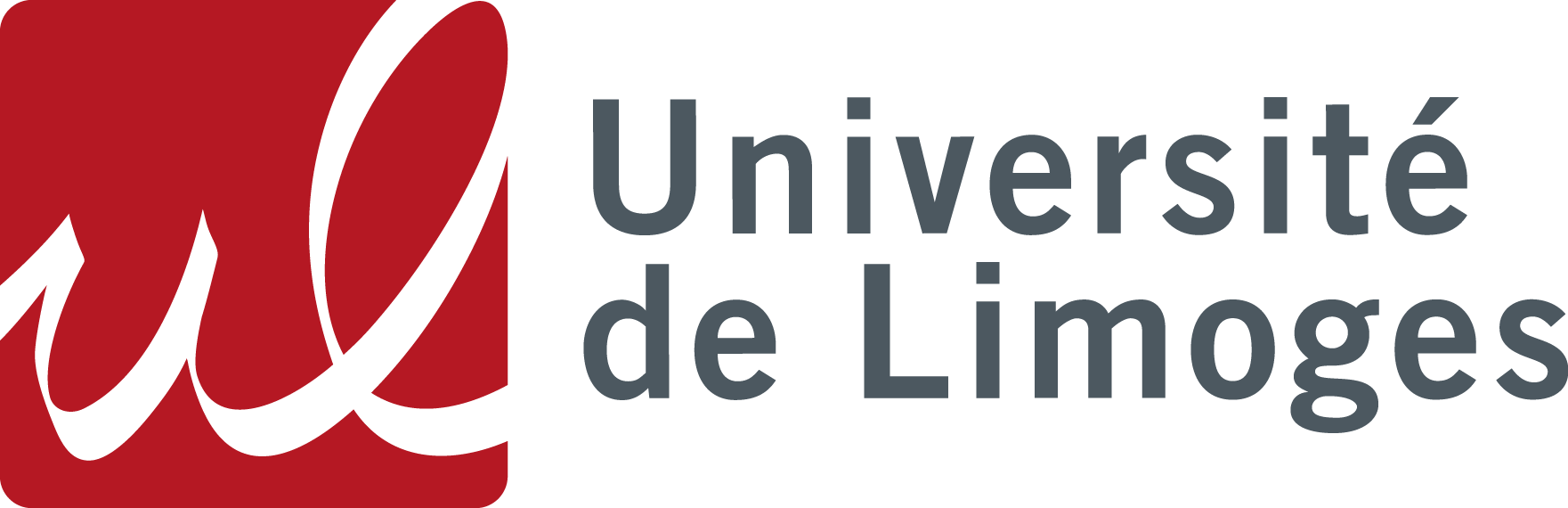

The University of Limoges (French: Université de Limoges) is a French public university, based in Limoges. Its chancellor is the rector of the Academy of Limoges (an administrative district in France for education and research). It counts more than 16,000 students and near 1,000 scholars and researchers. It offers complete curricula up to the doctorates and beyond in the traditional areas of knowledge. It was structured in October 1968 by the grouping of higher education institutions in Limoges. The oldest historical continuity is that of the faculties of pharmacy and medicine dating back to 1626.

It is one of the main higher education institutions in the Nouvelle-Aquitaine region. As of July 2015 it is a member of the Leonardo da Vinci consolidated University (Université confédérale Léonard de Vinci) along with the University of Poitiers, the University of La Rochelle, François Rabelais University and several engineering schools. University of Limoges is ranked as the top 50 among the universities in France.

University of Limoges is in the top 7% of universities in the world, ranking 29th in the France as 2020. Ranks 1st among universities in Limoges.

== History ==
The university of Limoges was created in 1968 by the incorporation into a single institution of various research schools of higher learning in Limoges, some of them previously affiliated to the University of Poitiers. At the time of its creation it counted 7,000 students and soon expanded to 15,000 making it a middle size university in France.

It inherits from a long tradition of research, innovation and teaching possibly dating back in the Middle Ages from the famed Abbaye Saint-Martial de Limoges founded in 848 and suppressed by the French Revolution in 1891, which was a major intellectual center in medieval Europe (technology of materials, enamel, manuscripts, scholarship, liturgy, theater, etc.). The modern School of Medicine and Pharmacy was created in 1626 (the present day's university council meets in the "Salle Saint-Alexis", the 17th century former chapel of the old Hôtel-Dieu University Hospital).

== Academics ==
The university offers bachelor, master and doctorate degrees in line with the Bologna Process. There are five main departments:

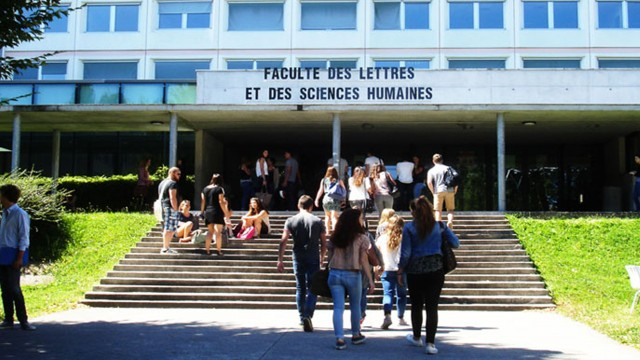
Department of Literature and Humanities, University of Limoges

- Department of Law and Economics
- Department of Literature and Humanities
- Department of Medicine
- Department of Pharmacy
- Department of Sciences and Technology

== Institutes and schools ==
- University Institute of Technology (Institut universitaire de technologie du Limousin)
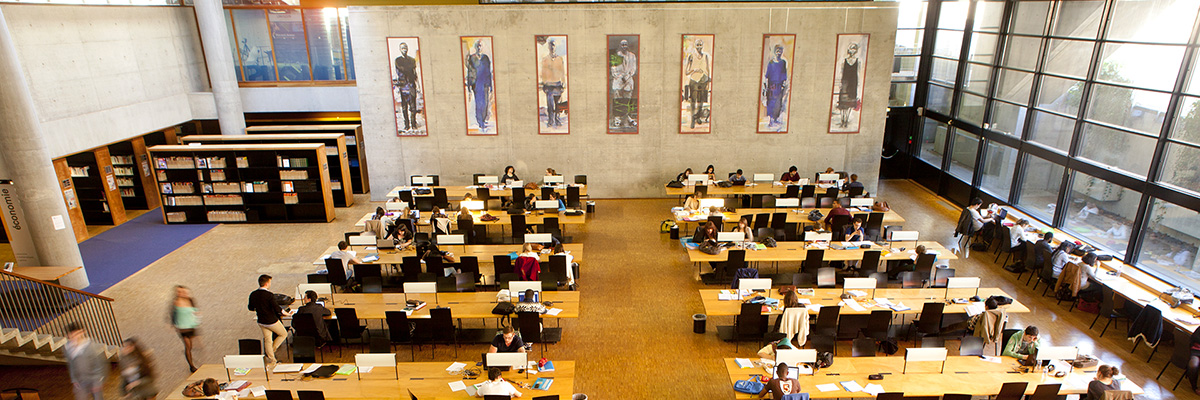
  University Library
- Institut d'Administration des Entreprises (IAE Limoges)
- Institut de préparation à l'administration générale (IPAG),
- Institut du Limousin de Formation aux Métiers de la Réadaptation (ILFOMER),
- École supérieure du professorat et de l'éducation (ESPE),
- ENSIL-ENSCI (Graduate Engineering School).

In addition, 3iL, School of Computer Engineering is associated with the University.

== Research ==
The University of Limoges has grouped its research laboratories into five major institutes:

- XLIM UMR CNRS 7252, a multidisciplinary research institute, in association with the Centre national de la recherche scientifique (CNRS), is the result of the merger of four laboratories (LACO, LMSI, UMOP, IRCOM). It brings together more than 500 professors, CNRS researchers and doctoral students working in computer science, mathematics, optics, electromagnetism or electronics.

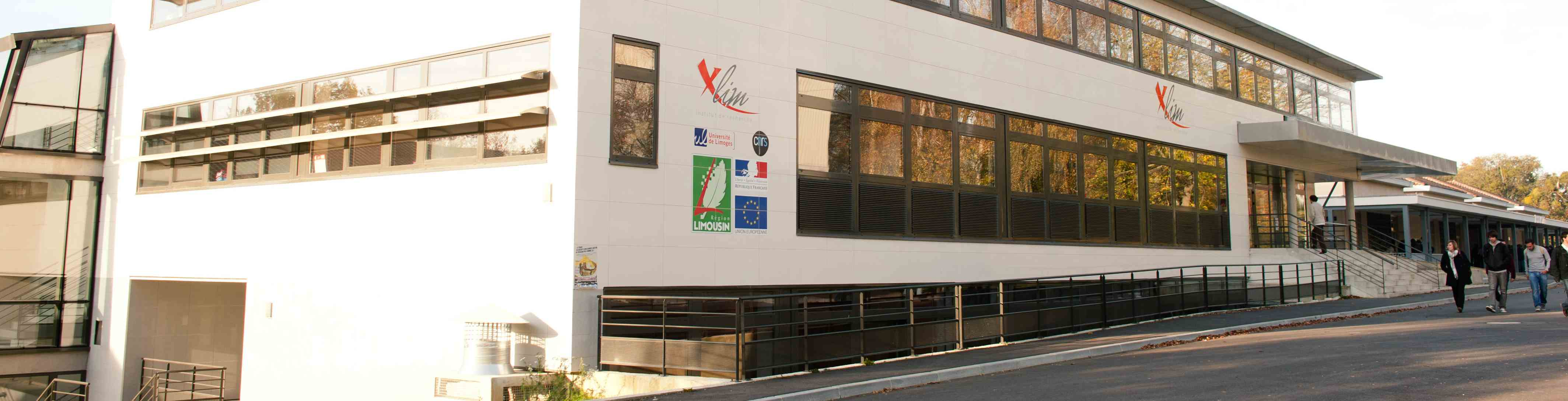
XLIM, French National Research Institute in Electronics, Photonics & Computer Science, CNRS

- IPAM (Institut des Procédés Appliqués aux Matériaux), bringing together two laboratories from the University and the École nationale supérieure de céramique industrielle, working on materials and process engineering.
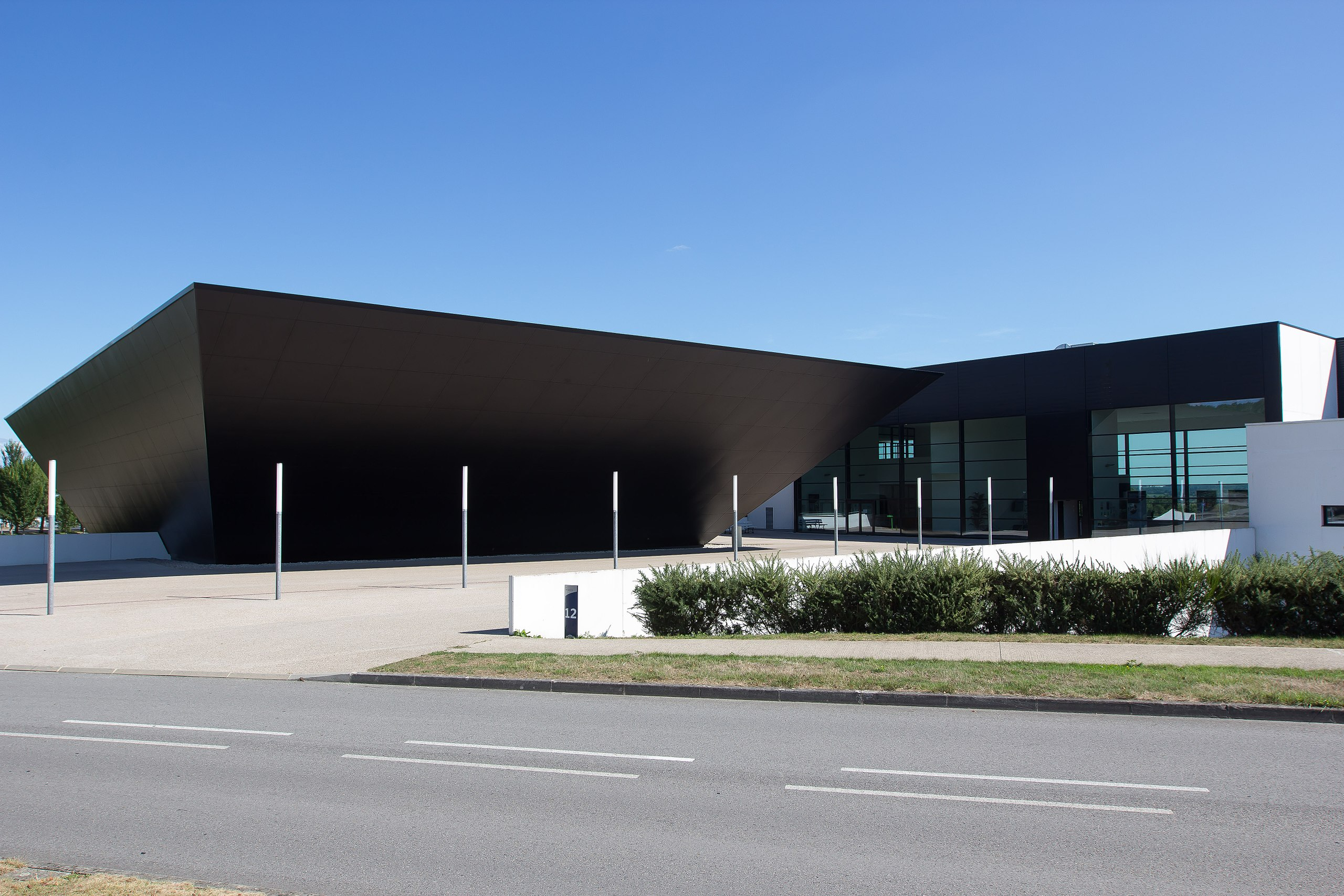
  IRCER, National Institute of Research on Ceramics & Materials, UMR 7315 CNRS
- GEIST (Genomics, Environment, Immunity, Health and Therapeutics).
- SHS (Human and Social Sciences).
- GIO (Governance of Institutions and Organisations).

The University also supports the activities of the NGO Europa, which is based in Limoges and is involved in the field of European public policies.

== Notable faculty ==
- Claude-Auguste Lamy (1820-1878) - chemist who discovered the element thallium
- Louis Pérouas (1923-2011) - specialist in the history of the French Catholic Church
- François Pairault (born 1940) - historian
- Jacques Fontanille (born 1948) - semiotician; university president
- Bertrand Lançon (born 1952) - historian and novelist, specialist of late Antiquity
- Nicole Belloubet (born 1955) - jurist; university rector; Socialist politician; government minister
- Bertrand Westphal (born 1962) - comparative literature and literary theory
- Romain Garnier (born 1976) - linguist who specialises in Latin and Indo-European linguistics
- Pierre Dusart - mathematician

== Notable alumni ==
- Sheila Abed - Paraguayan lawyer and politician
- Abdoulkader Kamil Mohamed (born 1951 in Souali, Djibouti) - politician; Prime Minister of Djibouti
- Amadou Koné (born 1953) - writer from Cote d'Ivoire
- David Jaomanoro (1953-2014) - Malagasy writer, playwright and poet
- Silvia Fernández de Gurmendi (born 1954) - Argentine lawyer, diplomat and judge
- Yolaine de Courson (born 1954) - politician LREM
- Sophie Dessus (1955-2016) - Socialist politician
- Faustine Fotso (born 1965) - computer scientist, environmentalist, lawyer and politician from Cameroon
- Mamadou Tangara (born 1965) - diplomat and politician from Gambia
- Zinedine Zidane (born 1972) - professional footballer; Sports Manager
- Christophe Jerretie (born 1979) - politician LREM
- Cherno Omar Barry - university administrator from Gambia

== See also ==
- Université de Limoges in the French Wikipedia
- List of public universities in France by academy
