= Xavier Delamarre =

French linguist (born 1954)

- Born: 5 June 1954 (age 72)
- Citizenship: French
- Occupations: Linguist, lexicographer

Academic background
- Education: IEP Paris (1977), INALCO (1978)

Academic work
- Discipline: Celtic linguistics
- Sub-discipline: Etymology, onomastics, toponymy, lexicography
- Institutions: CNRS
- Notable works: Dictionnaire de la langue gauloise (2001); Dictionnaire des thèmes nominaux du gaulois (2019–)

Xavier Delamarre (French pronunciation: [ɡzavje dəlamaʁ]; born 5 June 1954) is a French linguist and lexicographer. He is regarded as one of the world's foremost authorities on the Gaulish language.

With linguist Romain Garnier, Delamarre is the co-publishing editor of Wékwos, a journal founded in 2014 and devoted to Indo-European comparative linguistics.

== Career ==
Born on 5 June 1954, Xavier Delamarre graduated from Sciences Po in 1977, then studied the Lithuanian language at INALCO. In 1984, he published Le Vocabulaire indo-européen, a lexicon of Proto-Indo-European words. In 2001, Delamarre published an influential etymological dictionary of the Gaulish language entitled Dictionnaire de la langue gauloise. A second enlarged edition was issued in 2003.

Alongside his research in Indo-European and Celtic linguistics, Delamarre followed a career of diplomat from 1984 to 2014. He worked for the French diplomatic post in Helsinki (1984–86), then in Harare (1989–92), Vilnius (1992–97), Osaka (1997–98), and Ljubljana (1998–2000). From 2004 to 2006, Delamarre served as first counsellor at the French embassy in Helsinki, then as special adviser for international cooperation to the Secretary-General of the French government from 2008 to 2014. He retired from diplomatic duties in 2014 to focus on linguistic studies.

Since 2019, Delamarre has been an associate researcher for the CNRS-PSL AOrOc laboratory (Archéologie & Philologie d'Orient et d'Occident). Along with Pierre-Yves Lambert, he is also the co-administrator of Thesaurus Paleo-Celticus, a CNRS project launched in 2019 and aiming to update and replace Alfred Holder's Alt-celtischer Sprachschatz (1913).

== Works ==
- Le Vocabulaire indo-européen: lexique étymologique thématique. Adrien Maisonneuve. 1984. ISBN 978-2-7200-1028-6.
- Dictionnaire de la langue gauloise: Une approche linguistique du vieux-celtique continental (2 ed.). Errance. 2003 [2001]. ISBN 9782877723695.
- Noms de personnes celtiques dans l'épigraphie classique. Nomina Celtica Antiqua selecta Inscriptionum. Errance. 2007. ISBN 978-2-87772-350-3.
- Noms de lieux celtiques de l'Europe ancienne. -500 – +500. Dictionnaire. Errance. 2012. ISBN 978-2-87772-483-8.
- Les Noms des Gaulois. Studies in Old Celtic Names. Les Cent Chemins. 2017. ISBN 978-1-5468-6932-0.
- Une Généalogie des Mots. De l'Indo-Européen au Français : Introduction à l'étymologie lointaine. Errance. 2019. ISBN 978-2-87772-634-4.
- Dictionnaire des thèmes nominaux du gaulois. Ab-/Iχs(o)-. Vol. 1. Les Cents Chemins. 2019. ISBN 978-1-7980-5040-8.
- Dictionnaire des thèmes nominaux du gaulois. Lab-/Xantus. Vol. 2. Les Cents Chemins. 2023. ISBN 978-2957086030.
