= Paris-Est Sup University Group =

French association of universities

Paris-Est Sup
- Type: Public
- Established: 2014 (2007)
- Location: Marne-la-Vallée, France
- Website: Official website in English

The Paris-Est Sup is an association of universities and higher education institutions (ComUE) federating two universities and other institutions of higher education and research in the Paris-Est (eastern Paris) region.

Originally organized as a Pôle de recherche et d'enseignement supérieur (PRES) in March 2007, the founding members were University of Marne-la-Vallée and École Nationale des Ponts et Chaussées.

In application of the Law on Higher Education and Research (France), the University of Paris-Est became an association of universities and higher education institutions (ComUE) on 1 March 2015.

== Members ==
The founding members, according to the statute of the ComUE:

- ESIEE Paris
- École des ponts ParisTech
- École nationale vétérinaire d'Alfort
- Centre national de la recherche scientifique
- Institut français des sciences et technologies des transports, de l'aménagement et des réseaux
- Université Paris-Est Créteil
- Gustave Eiffel University
