= Faustine Fotso =

Cameroonian computer scientist and lawyer (born 1965)

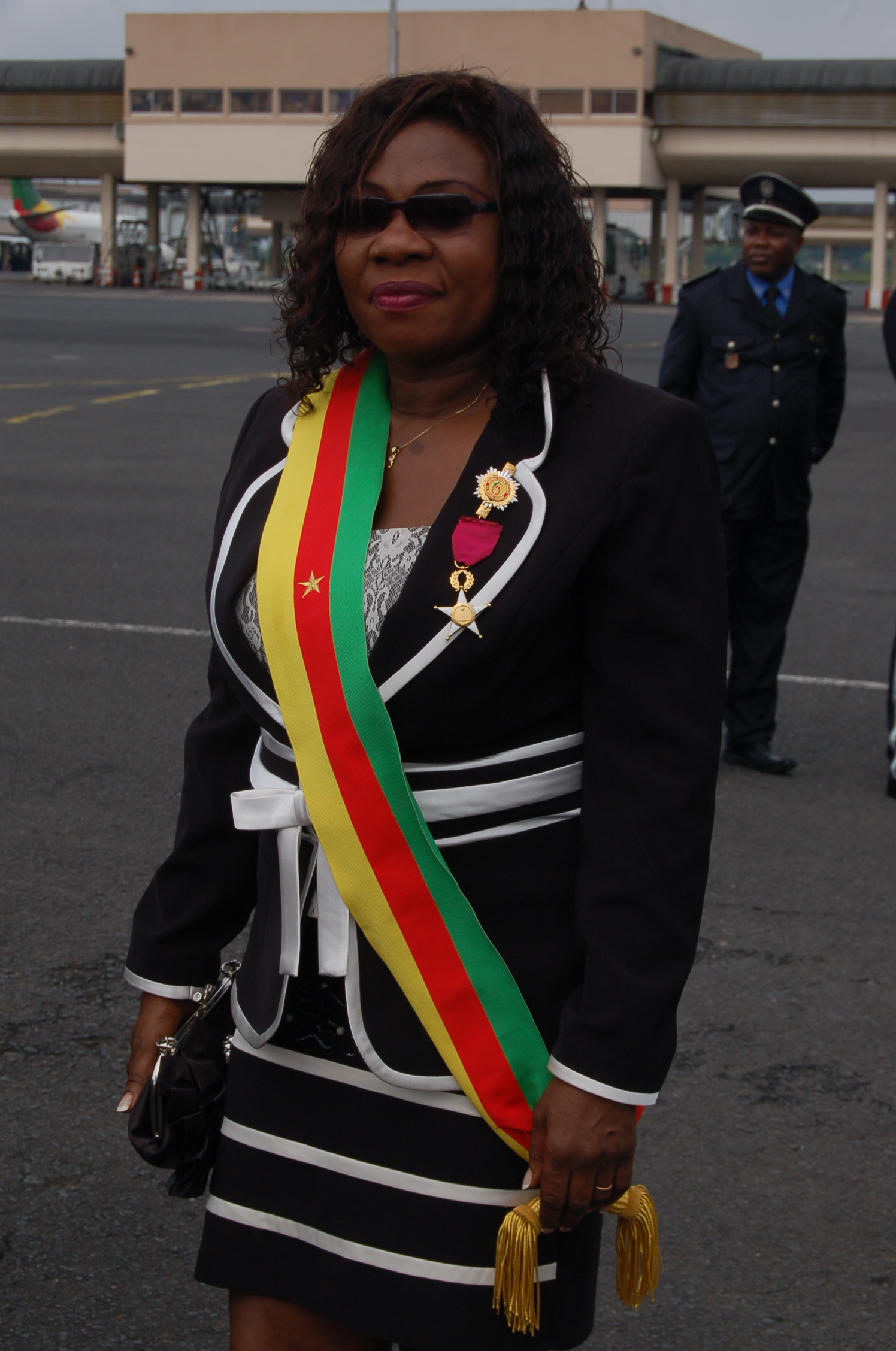
- Fotso at Douala International Airport to welcome President Paul Biya
- Born: Faustine Villanneau Chebou Kamdem; 12 June 1965 (age 61)
- Occupations: Computer scientist, environmentalist and lawyer
- Spouse: Lucas Fotso
- Children: 5

The Honorable Faustine Villanneau Chebou Kamdem Fotso (born 12 June 1965) is a computer scientist, environmentalist and lawyer from Cameroon.

== Career ==
In 2012, Fotso was 1st Deputy Mayor of Baham, a town in Western Cameroon. In 2013, she was elected MP in the National Parliament Assembly, representing the highlands of the Western Region. She sits on the Constitutional Laws Committee and belongs to the Cameroon People's Democratic Movement.

== Academic works ==
Fotso wrote the publication Environmental Impact Study in French and Cameroonian Law in 2009 as part of the Masters Program of International and Environmental Law at the University of Limoges.

== Charitable works ==
Fotso is the founder of the charitable association "Flame of Love, of Peace and Justice", which had its inaugural meeting on 20 September 2016.

== Awards ==
On 20 May 2016, Fotso was awarded the civilian medal in the rank of officer of the order of value at the 44th National Day of Unity in Baham.

== Personal life ==
Fotso is married to Lucas Fotso, regional director for the Cameroon electric company Aes Sonel Littoral. Together they have five children.
