= Béatrice Galinon-Mélénec =

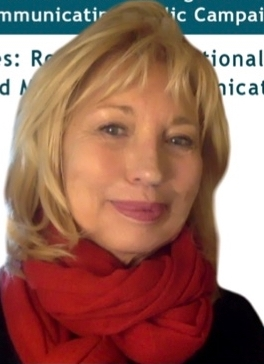
- 2021
- Born: 1949 (age 76–77); Lille, France
- Education: Paris V
- Known for: Founded the human-trace and sign-trace paradigms
- Scientific career
- Fields: Information sciences, communication sciences, communication anthropology
- Workplaces: University of Le Havre; CNRS-IDEES 6266
- Doctoral advisor: Gabriel Langouët

Béatrice Galinon-Mélénec (born 1949) is a French semiotician. She is professor emeritus of communication studies, specializing in the fields of anthropology of communication and the analysis of the non-verbal dimension of interpersonal communication situations. Her approach to the interpretation of signs is based on the new wave of semiotics, known as anthroposemiotics where embodied semiotics takes a central position.

== Biography ==
Galinon-Mélénec studied economics at the University of Toulouse, obtaining a doctorate from the University of Paris V-Sorbonne University of Sorbonne in Education Sciences in 1988 under the supervision of the sociologist, Gabriel Langouët. She was appointed associate professor at the Institut des Sciences de l'Information et de la Communication in 1989 at Bordeaux Montaigne University, and in 2002 became a University Professor of Information and Communication Sciences at University of Le Havre, at Le Havre's Institute of Technology.

At Bordeaux, she contributed to the launch in 1992, then to the development of the journal Communication & Organisation. She set up the CDHET (Research Network for Communication and Human Development, Enterprises and Territories), a research group which in 2000 opened up to interdisciplinary and inter-university research into the relationship between animal behavior and human behavior. Since 2008, she has been a permanent member of the joint research unit (UMR) of the Centre national de la recherche scientifique CNRS-IDEES 6266 (National Centre for Scientific Research – Identities and Differentiation of the Environment of Spaces and Societies) at Normandie Université, where she supervises the Human Trace programme.

In 2011, she founded the International Research Group: Human Traces. Since 2014, a network of researchers from various scientific backgrounds has been working on traces as part of the e-Laboratory on Human-Trace-Complex System Digital Campus UNESCO.

Since 2011, she has directed the Homme Trace series for CNRS éditions. This is a collection of works regularly publishing articles by research scientists contributing to the emergence of the new French school of thinking with respect to trace.

Since 2018, she is emeritus professor and continues to support the development of an ecosystemic vision of the concept of trace.

== Research work ==
=== Deconstruction of the concept of "trace" ===
Béatrice Galinon-Mélénec denounces the simplification of the use of the notion of trace which, contrary to appearances, needs to be analyzed in all its complexity. In her publications, she unveils the processes at work in human interpretation of the trace and, in line with the works of Jacques Derrida, encourages scientists who are concerned with epistemology to proceed with a systematic "deconstruction" of the term. In order to communicate more effectively, she describes the different uses of the term "trace" in plain language, shows that the "trace does not speak", that it is human beings who interpret a part of reality, calling it trace in terms of semiotic dynamics issuing from their relationship that is aware of the reality of their history. She reveals to the wider public, therefore, the existence of "the making of the trace" (2015), which includes the processes which lead to the perception and interpretation of the trace.

=== Sign-traces, relational embodied semiotics, anthroposemiotics ===
With the observation that everything that is potentially visible cannot necessarily be seen, Béatrice Galinon-Mélénec starts from the hypothesis that signs only appear to individuals who are predisposed to receive them; this depends on their body-traces, i.e. a body in which is recorded every consequence of the individuals' interactions with the environments they have passed through over time. For the author, a human being's body-trace, (there is no separation between the body and the mind) possesses a plasticity which is the result of the interactions with the surroundings in which he/she lives (nature, culture, techniques, society, etc.)

The interactions of a body with its surroundings, being specific to each individual, the resulting body-trace is recorded in a difference, which modulates the reception of what is perceptible. To signify that the perception and interpretation of the sign are the consequences, the author suggests the term sign-trace. The interpretation that each human makes of the real arises from anthroposemiotics in which the signs appear as the result of an interaction between an individual's body-trace and reality. This is assumed to exist in itself ("the reality itself") and is only accessible to humans through their body and a human's interpretation can therefore only be an "anthropo-centred reality".

"Relational embodied semiotics", which analyzes bodies' interaction of sign-traces, has been used by researchers or professionals to analyze interpersonal communication situations where the body is present. In this context, the interpretation of signs emitted by bodies appears as if recorded in a systemic dynamic linking the body-trace of the interpreted and the body-trace of the interpretant within a complex where bodies in co-presence are moved by permanent interactions of traces.

This approach finds its applications in various domains – internal business communication, recruitment, " doctor-patient relationships – and puts into perspective the biases introduced by remote communication.

=== Ichnos-anthropos (human-trace) at the heart of general ichnology ===
The human being is a human trace (ichnos-anthropos) whose body traces carry the "consequence-traces" of interactions of inside-outside dualism. According to the author, body-trace and environment-trace have been retro-acting in a systemic dynamic since the beginning of humanity, which explains the co-evolution of species and the environment which she analyzes using her "theory of General Ichnology". She demonstrates the interest of her applications by analyzing dangerous situations experienced by her contemporaries in the context of the digital society (2009) which she analyzes using her "theory of General Ichnology" and the health crisis of 2020.

The interpretation that the Ichnos-Anthropos makes of the real comes from anthroposemiotics, where signs appear as the result of an interaction between the body-trace of Ichnos-Anthropos and the reality-trace of the world. With the anthropological Human-Trace paradigm, Béatrice Galinon-Mélénec sets the figurative stage of homo (sapiens or otherwise) from any era whose body carries traces (ichnos) of the past (his or those of humans who have preceded him) and whose present relationship with the world participates permanently in the production of a future integrating the "consequence-traces" of his present actions. As the "Human-Trace" term was circulated and appropriated by other authors, it lost the paradigmatic dimension initially sought by the author. The effect of this being a preference for the Greek translation of "Ichnos-Anthropos" for instances referring to it in the strict sense of the paradigm.

=== Influence ===
There has been a growing interest in the terms "human trace", "body-trace" and "sign-trace". Nevertheless, if reference is made to certain indexing tools like Google Scholar, citations lead us to conclude that their uses in French articles in the humanities between 2008 and 2018 were more often linked to the evocative power of the words that form them than the systemic, dynamic and multi-scale perspective that they encompass for their author. Since 2020, the traces of digital consultations of the works and publications reveal a 60% readership in academia and various geographical horizons: Canada, Indonesie, Italie, Burkina Faso, Maroc, Japon, ...

In 2020, during the COVID-19 pandemic, observations of the consequence-traces of human confinement on the drop in pollution, widens the author's influence which had repeatedly warned about the pragmatic interest of the ecosystem present in the Human-Trace paradigm. The modelling of the semiotic emergence of the "sign-trace" via the "body-trace" – which highlights the specific relationship between a human-trace in constant evolution and a reality-trace constantly evolutionary – acts as a support to psychological, sociological, cognitive and ecological analysis of the observations.

== Main publications ==
=== In English ===
- The Trace Odyssey: A journey Beyond Appearances, London, Willey/Iste Editions, 2021, 150 p. (ISBN 978-1-78630-551-0)

=== In French ===
- L'Homme-Trace: Des traces du corps au corps-trace, Paris, CNRS Editions, 2017, 415 p. (ISBN 978-2-271-11417-4)
- L'Odyssée de la trace 1. Voyage au-delà des apparences, London, ISTE Editions, 2020.
- "Homme-trace" et "signes-traces", deux paradigmes français à l'épreuve des faits., Rouen, Klog Editions, 2012, 125 p. (ISBN 978-2-9539459-7-3)
- L'Homme trace: perspectives anthropologiques des traces contemporaines, Paris, CNRS Editions, 2011, 410 p. (ISBN 978-2-271-07139-2)
- Penser autrement la communication: Du sens commun vers le sens scientifique. Du sens scientifique vers la pratique, Paris/Budapest/Kinshasa etc., L'Harmattan, 2007, 247 p.(ISBN 978-2-296-02658-2)
- Homme/animal: quelles relations? Quelles communications?, Mont-Saint-Aignan, Presses Universitaires Rouen, 2003, 228 p.(ISBN 2-87775-353-0)
- De la formation à l'emploi, le rôle de la communication, Presses Universitaires Pau, 1994, 256 p. (ISBN 978-2-908930-15-3)
- Projet et communication dans les universités, Editions d'Organisation, 1991, 225 p. (ISBN 978-2-7081-1320-6)
- Traces numériques: De la production à l'interprétation, with Sami Zlitni, Paris, CNRS Editions, 2015, 290 p.(ISBN 978-2-271-07239-9)
- L'Homme-trace: Inscriptions corporelles et techniques, with Fabien Lienard and Sami Zlitni, Paris, CNRS Editions, 2015, 284p. (ISBN 978-2-271-08324-1)
- Le corps communicant: le XXIe siècle, civilisation du corps?, with Fabienne Martin-Juchat, Paris, L'Harmattan, 2008, 239p. (ISBN 978-2-296-04597-2)

=== Online articles ===
- Galinon-Mélénec, Béatrice (2017). "From 'Traces' and 'Human Trace' to 'Human-Trace Paradigm'". First Complex Systems Digital Campus World E-Conference 2015. Springer Proceedings in Complexity. pp. 337–349. doi:10.1007/978-3-319-45901-1_36. ISBN 978-3-319-45900-4.
- Galinon-Mélénec, Béatrice (1 June 2015). "À la recherche de la trace". Communication et Organisation (47): 31–50. doi:10.4000/communicationorganisation.4876.
- Galinon-Mélénec, Béatrice (16 December 2014). "The future of the 'Homme-trace'". Netcom. Réseaux, communication et territoires (28–1/2): 107–130. doi:10.4000/netcom.1554.
- Galinon-Mélénec, Béatrice; Martin-Juchat, Fabienne (15 January 2014). "Du « genre » social au « genre » incorporé : Le « corps genré » des SIC". Revue française des sciences de l'information et de la communication (4). doi:10.4000/rfsic.857.
- Galinon-Mélénec, Béatrice (30 July 2013). "Expérience incarnée, construction cognitive et jugement". Revue française des sciences de l'information et de la communication (3). doi:10.4000/rfsic.487.
- "Des signes-traces à l'Homme-trace. La production et l'interprétation des traces placées dans une perspective anthropologique", Intellectica, 2013; read online (http://intellectica.org/fr/des-signes-traces-l-homme-trace-la-production-et-l-interpretation-d es-traces-placees-dans-une perspective anthropoloogique)
