= Reform of French universities =

The Reform of French universities is an extensive overhaul of the French public higher education system. The reform was initiated by Nicolas Sarkozy soon after his election as President of France, in line with his campaign policies. His government passed the bill, Liberties and Responsibilities of Universities in 2007. Its intent was to allow universities more financial autonomy, while reducing the need for government funding. The reform programme was modified by the subsequent François Hollande government in 2013, with the introduction of the Law on Higher Education and Research. The new law aimed to rationalise the geographic coverage of higher education courses and research areas, encouraging merging of some institutions. National limits on certain professional and technical degrees were introduced, along with measures that permitted greater selectivity of students, in alignment with high school academic achievement. Most recently, the "Law on Orientation and Academic Success" was enacted in 2018, extending the measures begun by the Hollande reform.
