= Academic ranks in France =

The following summarizes basic academic ranks in the French higher education system. Most academic institutions are state-run and most academics with permanent positions are civil servants, and thus are tenured (after a one-year probationary period).

Several parallel career paths exist, depending on the type of institution. The three paths correspond to teacher-researchers (enseignants-chercheurs), researchers, and teachers. It is possible to be promoted from one path to another. Several ranks exist within each path. Increases in rank (for example, the promotion from associate professor to full professor) come with an increase in salary and responsibility and are subject to some conditions, such as the habilitation. In most cases, moving to a higher rank requires going through an open recruitment competition, the same procedure used for initially obtaining the position in the lower rank.

Temporary positions include PhD students, postdoctoral researchers, and temporary teachers (usually called vacataires or chargé d'enseignement). There also exist some administrative ranks, held by permanent employees and often elected by their peers, such as university president or dean. Ranks in private schools and grandes écoles are often organized differently.

== Public institutions ==
=== Overview ===
The following table summarizes the various academic titles used in France, determined by the paths (faculty, research, teaching) and the ranks, together with some equivalent titles in schools with special status. The common abbreviation for the title is presented in parentheses after the title.

	Faculty (teacher-researchers)	Research-only	Teaching-only	Part-time
Permanent	Professeur des universités (PR); Directeur d'études (école des chartes, école des hautes études en sciences sociales, école pratique des hautes études, école française d'Extrême-Orient); Astronome (observatoire de Paris); Physicien (Institut de Physique du Globe de Paris); Professeur des universités-praticien hospitalier (Teaching hospitals)	Directeur de recherche (DR)	n/a	Professeur des universités associé
Permanent	Maître de conférences (MCF); Astronome-adjoint (observatoire de Paris); Physicien-adjoint (Institut de Physique du Globe de Paris); Maître de conférences-praticien hospitalier Maître-assistant (Architectural and Agricultural Science Schools, institut Mines-Télécom, Veterinary Schools)	Chargé de recherche (CR)	Professeur agrégé (PRAG); Professeur certifié (PRCE)	Maître de conférences associé
Temporary	Attaché temporaire d'enseignement et de recherche (ATER); Assistant (Agricultural Science Schools, Veterinary Schools); Assistant hospitalo-universitaire (Teaching Hospitals); Chef de clinique des universités-assistant des hôpitaux (Teaching Hospitals)	Post-doctorant	Chargé d'enseignement	
Temporary	Doctorant contractuel chargé d'enseignement	Doctorant contractuel	Chargé d'enseignement	

=== Faculty positions ===
Faculty members are called enseignants-chercheurs (literally, teachers-researchers). In general, their statute is governed by the Decree 84-431 of June 6, 1984 (with some exceptions: for example, faculty members in public hospitals have a statute governed by another decree). They are civil servants, but they benefit from a special statute which guarantees academic freedom. While most civil service roles are only available to citizens of the EU, appointments to these positions are made regardless of citizenship.

After gaining a doctorate from a university, and usually after several years of temporary postdoctoral positions, scholars who wish to enter a permanent academic career may apply for the position of maître de conférences (MCF). To achieve this, they must first be approved by the National Council of Universities, made up of elected and appointed MCFs and university professors. For candidates who have first been approved in this way, the recruitment to positions is carried out in each individual university, mostly by a selection committee of other MCFs and professors, half from the university where the position is available, half from other universities, rather than by administrators. However, the final decision is made by the Academic Council of the university.

The salary scale is national, so pay does not vary from one university to another. A recent reform allows for the possibility of salary modulation in the universities, but for now this remains to be implemented.

After some years in the maître de conférences position, an MCF may apply for a habilitation à diriger des recherches ("habilitation to direct research", HDR), which allows them to supervise doctoral theses. Although this qualification is most commonly pursued by MCFs, it is not restricted to them—postdoctoral researchers and other non‐permanent academics may also apply for the HDR. The HDR is a prerequisite for applying for a position of professeur des universités ("university professor"), whether at their home university or at another institution. Their suitability for such a position will be judged by the National Council of Universities (restricted to full professors). Each individual application is examined by a selection committee, composed exclusively of full professors. Application are mostly judged on their published original research as well as on teaching and administrative duties. In the past, this required a higher doctorate ("state doctorate"). In some fields, such as law, management (gestion), and economics, candidates take the competitive examination known as agrégation; only those achieving the highest grades are appointed.

Note that in French, the word professeur is used much more widely than the English "professor", and when used on its own it suggests a schoolteacher in secondary education. Qualified terms such as professeur des universités are therefore used to clarify the function of the professeur.

In higher educational establishments outside the university system, such as the École polytechnique, teaching staff follow different hierarchies and career paths. In particular, senior staff at the EHESS, EPHE, École des chartes and École française d'Extrême-Orient are called directeurs d'études instead of professeurs des universités.

==== Permanent positions ====
Maître de conférences and Professeurs des universités are both permanent positions. This is not the same as tenure, strictly speaking, but is instead due to the status of civil servant in public universities. Since all French universities are state-run, faculty members are civil servants and enjoy increased employment protection compared to the private sector.

- Professeur des universités (PR, professor) is the highest rank in the faculty path of French academia. In some institutions (école des chartes, école des hautes études en sciences sociales), professors use the title directeur d'études (Director of Studies). According to their statute, professors have priority to teach lectures (as opposed to exercise sessions) and to be elected as director of research units. The rank has three pay grades: 2nd class, 1st class, and exceptional class.
- Maître de conférences (MCF, Assistant professor/Lecturer/Senior Lecturer), is the second rank of the faculty path in French academia. The rank has two pay grades: normal class and outstanding class ("hors-classe": "H.C.").

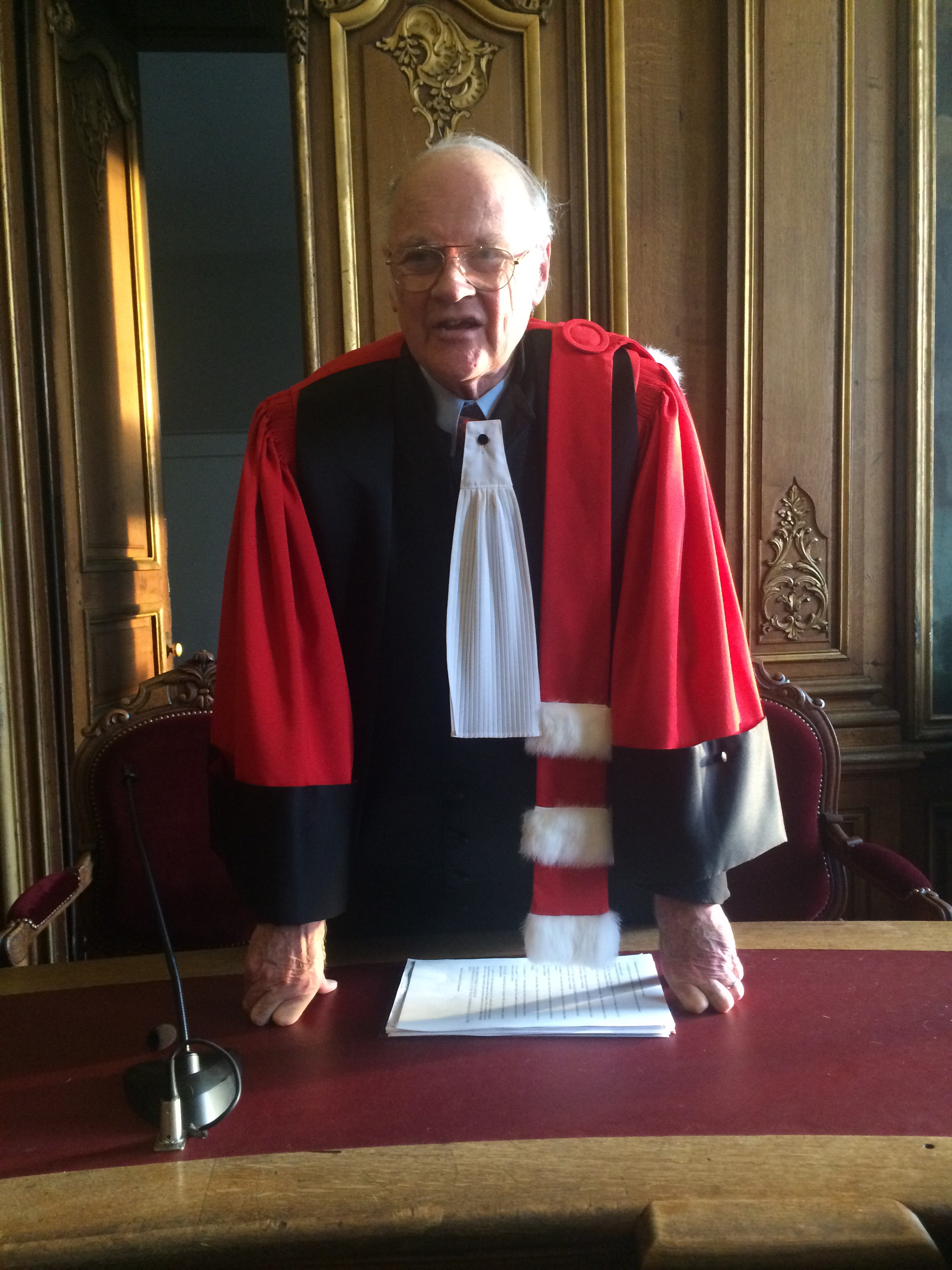
A law full professor wearing his academic robe.

No one can become Professeur or Maître de Conférences without a doctorate. The habilitation (HDR) to direct doctoral theses is a necessary step to be promoted from MCF to PR. There exists no internal promotion to go from MCF to PR. Instead, a candidate must participate in the competition for an open position, usually in a different university. Progression from one pay grade to the next (e.g. 2nd class to 1st class) is internal to the university, and entails an increase in salary and responsibility.

In Law, Political Science, and Economics, it is possible to be recruited directly as a full professor by passing the agrégation (distinct from the secondary school system's agrégation, more widespread). Consequently, some scholars become professors without prior experience as a Maître de conférences. This remains rare however, most of the time the aggregation is a way to accelerate career advancement for the Maîtres de conférences (this is known as the voie courte, or short way, as opposed to the voie longue).

The French Ministry of Higher Education and Research provides a comparative table for faculty ranks in France and worldwide. For example, professeur corresponds to (full) professor in North America and the UK, while maître de conférences corresponds to (tenured) associate professor in North America, or to lecturer/reader/senior lecturer in the UK depending on pay grade and whether the habilitation was obtained or not.

==== Temporary positions ====
- Attaché temporaire d'enseignement et de recherche (ATER, Temporary Research and Teaching Attaché). They have a one-year contract renewable once, except for civil servants, who may hold an ATER position up to 4 years in total. ATERs have the same responsibilities and compensation as many non tenure-track faculty in North America. They do research work, and they also teach 192 hours/year. This kind of position is sometimes used as a "bridge" at the end of a PhD, if the candidate is not able to complete their dissertation in three years and needs an extension.
- Doctorant contractuel (Contractual PhD candidate): PhD candidates who have obtained a specific type of grant to fund their PhD. This grant is a 3-years position (non renewable), and the candidate is an employee of the university during that time. They are expected to work on a dissertation and to participate in research activities. In addition, doctorants are sometimes also chargé d'enseignement, meaning that they teach 64 hours per year, usually at the undergraduate level.

==== Part-time ====
There also exist equivalent ranks as state employees (non civil service) for professors coming from industry and working part-time in a university. These ranks are maître de conférences associé (MAST) and professeur des universités associé (PAST), depending on academic experience. Despite the similarity, "associé" is not synonymous with "associate" (an associate professor is a mid-seniority professor, where a professeur associé is a part-time professor) and would be closer to adjunct.

=== Research-only positions ===
There also exist permanent, research positions, without teaching duties. They are offered by certain public research institutions, the Public Scientific and Technical Research Establishments, for instance the French National Centre for Scientific Research (CNRS), the Institute of Research for Development (IRD), the National Institute of Health and Medical Research (INSERM), or the French Institute for Research in Computer Science and Automation (Inria). Again, people in these positions are civil servants (thus, in this sense, tenured). Their statute is governed by the Decree #2023-1321 of December 27, 2023.

There are two levels, matching those of the teaching-research staff

- Chargé de recherche (CR, Associate Research Professor): equivalent to maître de conférences. It is a permanent research-only position. The pay grades are "normal class" and "outstanding class".
- Directeur de recherche (DR, Research Professor): equivalent to professeur. It is a permanent research-only position. The pay grades are "2nd class", "1st class", and "exceptional class".

The main differences between these research positions and the faculty positions are, of course, the absence of teaching duties, and the ability to move between different labs (for example, a CNRS researcher can request to move to any CNRS lab in France or abroad, whereas a faculty member is employed by a specific university).

Just like for faculty appointments, there are no internal promotion from CR to DR. Instead, each year, national competitions are open to fill new positions, and it is necessary to participate in the national competition to move from one rank to the next. It is possible for a maître de conférences to become directeur de recherches, just like it is possible for a chargé de recherches to become professeurs des universités.

The complete name of the position usually makes the institution explicit, for example directeur de recherche au CNRS, or chargé de recherche à l'INRIA. It has to be noticed that some of these positions can be located not in a laboratory proper to the Public Scientific and Technical Research Establishment, but in a mixed research structure, common with a university (UMR).

These establishments also offer engineer positions that include a research part, besides more technical duties (e.g. preparation of a database, experimental apparatus, etc.): ingénieur d'études may include an important research part, ingénieur de recherche always includes a dominant research part. There also exists some contractual positions (from a few months to a few years).

=== Teaching-only positions ===
- Professeur agrégé (PRAG): Secondary school teachers who received the agrégation (not the similarly named agrégation du supérieur) but who teach at university level.
- Professeur certifié (PRCE): Secondary school teacher teaching at university level. These teachers have a lesser degree than PRAGs, the certification.
- Chargé d’enseignement: Title used broadly for every instructor who teaches at any university on a regular basis, though not at a full-time position.

== Grandes écoles ==
The grandes écoles is a parallel educational system generally attributed to Napoleon. These institutions of higher education each specialize in a specific domain, such as business, political science, or engineering. Some of them are grands établissements (for example Sciences Po Paris) are part of the state university recruitment system. The others – mainly the private schools – follow various guidelines. Among the business schools it is common to follow the North American terminology. That is,

- Chargé d'enseignement or vacataire: Instructor, temporary position.
- Professeur affilié: Adjunct professor.
- Professeur assistant: Assistant professor
- Professeur associé: Associate professor
- Professeur: Full professor.
- Chaired professorships can be given to associate and full professors.

Typically, anyone teaching in a private school will identify themselves publicly as "Professeur" regardless of their internal rank. This is an acceptable practice for tenured or full-time staff (professeurs permanents) and permanently employed part-time staff (professeurs affiliés). It is considered inappropriate for others who teach a single course (vacataires or chargés d'enseignements).

Other titles exist, each with different ranks:

- Lecturer: generally teaches and his research obligations are limited. Other ranks are Senior Lecturer or Principal Lecturer.
- Professor of Practice: typically is an expert in his field. He typically teaches and maintains contacts with the business world. Other ranks are Senior Professor of Practice (rank equivalent to associate professor) or Principal Professor of Practice (rank equivalent to full professor).
- A Teaching Fellow: most of the time teaches full time.

== Administrative ranks ==
Several administrative appointments can be held by academics in France. Most are elected positions, with prerogatives and duties described in the statutes of the relevant organization (university, faculty, research lab...).

- Recteur (Rector): High-level civil servants appointed by the Ministry of education to oversee an educational district called académie. They are also chancellor of the universities in their district, meaning that they administer the real estate owned by the State and used by the university. They are usually chosen from among senior university professors.
- Président de l'université (University President): Elected position, usually held by a professor, for four years. Presides over the Conseil d'administration (Board of Directors), an elected body which governs the university. Usually also presides the Conseil académique (Academic Council), another elected body responsible for defining the University's research policies.
- Doyen (Dean) or Directeur d'unité de formation et de recherche (Director of Teaching and Research Unit): Elected position, chairperson of one of the university schools, called faculté or unité de formation et de recherche. Presides over the Conseil de faculté (Faculty Council) or the Conseil d'UFR (UFR Council), an elected body representing the faculty.
- Directeur d'unité de recherche (Director of Research Unit): Appointed chairperson of a research unit. Presides over the Conseil de laboratoire (Laboratory Council), an elected body representing the research unit. Appoints the Responsables d'équipe (team leaders) who manage the teams that constitute the research unit.
- Directeur d'école doctorale (Director of Graduate School): Appointed chairperson of one of a graduate school.

== See also ==
- Civil Service of France
- University reform in France
