= Le Havre Normandy University =

French university in Le Havre, founded in 1984

Coordinates: 49°29′45″N 0°7′46″E

- Université Le Havre Normandie
- Type: Public
- Affiliations: Global U8 (GU8); Normandy University
- Budget: 69 million euros (2010)
- President: Pedro Lages dos Santos
- Academic staff: 399
- Students: 8,200
- Location: Le Havre, Normandie, Seine-Maritime, France
- Website: www.univ-lehavre.fr
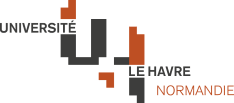

Le Havre Normandy University (French: Université Le Havre Normandie) is a French university located in Le Havre. Along with five other schools, Le Havre Normandy University is a member of Normandy University, an association of universities and higher education institutions.

== Identity in Normandy ==
Le Havre Normandy University (Université Le Havre Normandie) is a French university in the Academy of Rouen, co-founder in 2015 of ComUE Normandy University

It takes part in the XL-Chem Graduate School of Research project, funded by the State via the National Research Agency.

== Digital Campus / Network Unesco ==
Le Havre Normandy University is co-founder (with the University of Strasbourg) of the Unitwin Complex System Digital Campus UNESCO (List-unesco-networks ).

== Notable people ==
=== Faculty ===
- Béatrice Galinon-Mélénec (born 1949) - semiotician.

=== Alumni ===
- Ida Daussy (born 1969) - French born television personality in South Korea; also known by her Korean name Seo Hye-na
- Stéphanie Kerbarh (born 31 July 1975) - politician
- Yasir Nawab – Vice-Chancellor of the University of Kamalia.

=== Honorary degree recipients ===
- James A. Yorke, Doctor Honoris Causa degree from le Havre university, June 2014.

== See also ==
- List of public universities in France by academy
- History of Le Havre
