= Institut national supérieur de formation et de recherche pour l'éducation inclusive =

- Centre national d'études et de formation pour l'enfance inadaptée
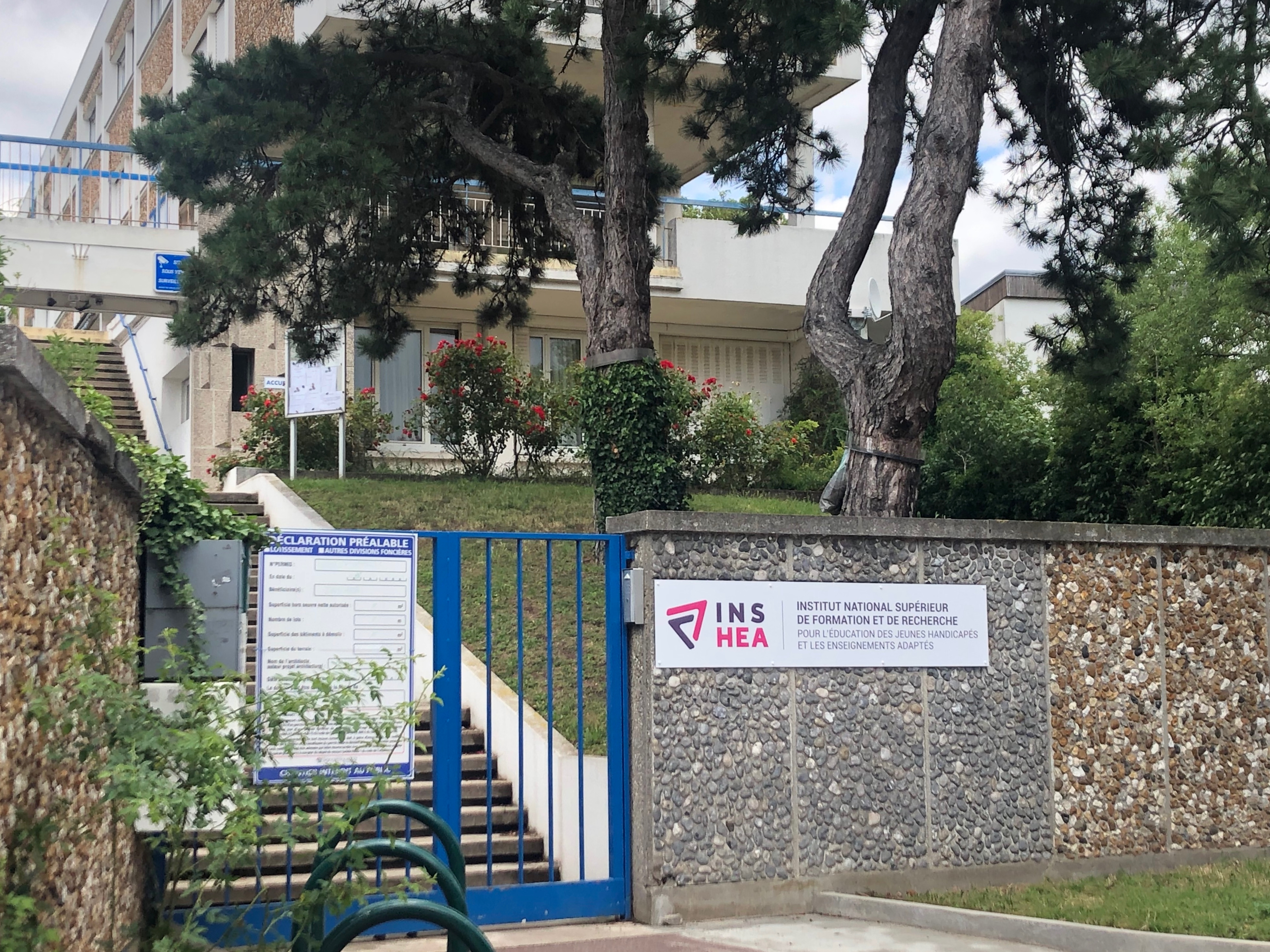
- Type: Public
- Established: 1954
- Affiliations: Université Paris Lumières
- Location: Suresnes, France; 48°52′8.355″N 2°12′54.901″E
- Website: Official Website

The Institut national supérieur de formation et de recherche pour l'éducation inclusive or INSEI (National Higher Institute for Training and Research for the Education of Young Disabled Persons and Special Education, formerly Institut national supérieur de formation et de recherche pour l'éducation des jeunes handicapés et les enseignements adaptés or INS-HEA) is a public college in Suresnes. It is part of the Université Paris Lumières.

INSEI has its buildings next to the Fort Mont-Valérien, in Suresnes. About eighty Academics train National Education staff in the fields of disability and difficulty of schooling.
