= Nantes-Atlantic National College of Veterinary Medicine, Food Science and Engineering =

French educational institution

Coordinates: 47°17′21.14″N 1°31′20.8″E

- Motto: French: Santé et alimentation au coeur de la vie
- Motto in English: Health and food at the heart of life
- Type: Public veterinary school
- Established: 2010 (from the fusion of schools established in 1979 and 1974)
- Affiliations: Université Nantes Angers Le Mans
- Students: 1,100
- Location: Nantes, Pays de la Loire, France
- Website: www.oniris-nantes.fr

The Nantes-Atlantic National College of Veterinary Medicine, Food Science and Engineering (French: École nationale vétérinaire, agroalimentaire et de l'alimentation, Nantes-Atlantique) also known as Oniris or Oniris Nantes, is a French educational institution. It operates under the supervision of the ministry of Agriculture. It opened on 1 January 2010 in Nantes, in the Pays de la Loire region.

Oniris was the result of the fusion of the National Veterinary School of Nantes, established in 1979, and of the National School of Agri-Food Engineering of Nantes, established in 1974.

It is one of four French national colleges training veterinary surgeons. It also trains agri-food engineers.
