= École nationale supérieure d'ingénieurs de Caen =

Engineering college in France

Coordinates: 49.2138°N 0.3679°W

ENSICAEN
- École nationale supérieure d'ingénieurs de Caen
- Type: Public engineering school, Grande école
- Established: 1976; 50 years ago
- Affiliations: Couperin consortium, CGE
- Budget: 16,6 M€
- Director: Gilles Ban
- Academic staff: 85
- Students: 700
- Location: Caen, 14000, France
- Website: www.ensicaen.fr

The École nationale supérieure d'ingénieurs de Caen & Centre de Recherche (ENSICAEN), which translates as National Graduate School of Engineering & Research Center, is one of the French grandes écoles, whose main purpose is to form chemical, electronical, and Computer science engineers (with a level "bac+5"). It is located on the city of Caen, Normandy.

== Graduate specializations ==
The school delivers five engineering degrees accredited by the French Commission des titres d'ingénieur:

- electronics and applied physics
- computer science
- chemical engineering
- industrial engineering
- mechanical and materials engineering

In general, the obtained degrees are internationally recognized as equivalent to masters of science, for instance in the United States.
