= Groups of universities and institutions (France) =

In France, Communautés d'Universités et Établissements (COMUEs; Communities of Universities and Institutions) are groups of universities and higher education institutions. A COMUE is a form of Établissement Public à caractère Scientifique, Culturel et Professionnel (EPCSP).

These organizations were created with the Law on Higher Education and Research of July 2013. It replaced the previous structure, the Pôle de recherche et d'enseignement supérieur (PRES), that existed from 2007 to 2013. Unlike the former PRES, they are able to award degrees, and have program budgets.

== List of communities of universities and institutions (COMUEs) in France ==
As of 5 May 2021, there are eight university groups known as COMUEs, or communities of universities and institutions, in France:

- Burgundy - Franche-Comté University Group
- Federal University of Toulouse Midi-Pyrénées University Group
- HESAM University Group
- Leonardo da Vinci University Group
- Normandy University Group
- Paris-Est Sup University Group
- Paris Lumières University Group
- University of Lyon University Group

== Former ==
- University of Champagne (2015–2017)

== See also ==
- Liberties and Responsibilities of Universities (2013 French law)
- University associations and consortia in France
- Franco-German University (an international cooperation project with universities in Germany)
