= Law on Higher Education and Research (France) =

The Law on Higher Education and Research of July 22, 2013 replaced laws promulgated by the previous French government in 2006 and 2007 (for example the law on Liberties and Responsibilities of Universities) regarding the organization and autonomy of universities and other research and higher education institutions in France.

During the 2012 French presidential election, François Hollande promised to review and improve conditions for undergraduate and graduate education and research in French universities. Shortly after the election, Geneviève Fioraso, minister for higher education and research, launched an assessment process led by an independent committee in dialogue with the university community. The committee presented a report on December 17, 2012 containing 135 recommendations. Some of the proposals received criticism, but these formed the basis for the new law presented to the National Assembly (France) in March 2013, and adopted into law July 22, 2013. Other than a dispute over the introduction of English into university courses there was little public debate.

== Contents of the Law ==
The first title of the new law concerned general principles such as teaching in the French language, (Note: Articles L121-3 of the code de l’Éducation, modified by article 2 of the law on higher education and research) or the use of Free software. Ministers in charge of Higher Education and Research would be responsible for 5-year strategic national plans.

The law describes national limits on general professional degrees and minimal percentages on professional graduates and technological graduates. Students have a right to access more selective university programs if they have sufficiently high grades on their baccalauréat (high school graduation exam).

=== Geographic coordination ===
The law provides that "coordination is organized by only one establishment of higher education for a given territory [academic or interacademic]".

Every institution of higher education needed to plan for the following to establish this coordination:

- merging with one or more other institutions
- participating in an association of universities and higher education institutions,
- associating in another form of public scientific, cultural or professional establishment (EPSCP). (Note: Articles L718-2 and L718-3 of the code de l’Éducation, created by article 62 of the law on higher education and research)

The Association of universities and higher education institutions (communauté d’universités et établissements) is a new type of EPSCP created by this law; at the same time, the pôles de recherche et d'enseignement supérieur (PRES), the réseaux thématiques de recherche avancée (RTRA) and the établissements publics de coopération scientifique (EPCS), created by the 2006 law on research coordination are discontinued. (Note: Article 66 of the law on higher education and research)

Now there are Communities of universities and institutions (COMUE).

== See also ==
- Pôle de recherche et d'enseignement supérieur, PRES (2007−2013)
- Communities of universities and institutions, Communautés d’Universités et Établissements (COMUE) (est. 2013)
