= List of universities and colleges in France =

This list of universities and colleges in France includes universities and other higher education institutes that provide both education curricula and related degrees up to doctoral degree and also contribute to research activities. They are the backbone of the tertiary education institutions in France. They are listed as different categories, depending on their administrative status, size and extents of research activity compared to educational activities.

Aside from the nationally funded public education system that provides recognised degrees to the vast majority of students in France and that keeps tuition fees low, there exist private institutes.

== Public universities in France ==
French public universities (see List of public universities in France for a detailed list) are as of 2015 in the process of reorganization according to the Law on Higher Education and Research passed in July 2013. This includes some merging of institutions, and the previous high-level organization under Pôle de recherche et d'enseignement supérieur (PRES) has been dissolved for Communities of Universities and Institutions (COMUE).

== Public technical universities, institutes of technologies and autonomous scientific higher education institutes ==
The Établissements publics à caractère scientifique, culturel et professionnel (EPCSP) that are not listed as universities in the list above operate as university-grade institutes.

=== Within a public university ===
- Paris-Saclay University (Paris region)
  - CentraleSupélec
  - École normale supérieure de Paris-Saclay
- PSL University (Paris region)
  - École normale supérieure de Paris
  - École pratique des hautes études
  - Collège de Paris
  - Collège de France
  - Dauphine
  - Conservatoire de Paris
  - Conservatoire National Supérieur d'Art Dramatique
  - École des Beaux-Arts
- Sorbonne University (Paris region)
  - University of Technology of Compiègne (alliance)
- Paris Cité University (Paris region)
  - Institut de Physique du Globe de Paris
  - Institut d'Études Politiques de Paris (alliance)
  - Institut national des langues et civilisations orientales (alliance)
- Gustave Eiffel University (Paris region)
  - ESIEE Paris - École Supérieure d'Ingénieurs en Électrotechnique et Électronique
- CY Cergy Paris University (Paris region)
  - Institut supérieur de mécanique de Paris (alliance)
- Hautes Écoles Sorbonne Arts et Métiers University (Paris region)
  - Arts et Métiers
  - Conservatoire National des Arts et Métiers
- University of Lyon (Lyon)
  - École centrale de Lyon
  - École normale supérieure de Lyon
  - Institut National des Sciences Appliquées de Lyon
- University of Toulouse (Toulouse)
  - ISAE-SUPAERO
  - Institut National des Sciences Appliquées de Toulouse
  - Toulouse Institute of Technology
    - ENSEEIHT
    - ENSIACET
    - ENSAT - École Nationale Supérieure Agronomique de Toulouse
- Polytechnic University of Hauts-de-France (Valenciennes)
  - Institut National des Sciences Appliquées des Hauts-de-France
- Grenoble Alpes University (Grenoble)
  - Grenoble Institute of Technology
- University of Nantes (Nantes)

=== Autonomous scientific higher education institutes ===
- École centrale de Lille
- École centrale de Lyon
- École centrale de Marseille
- École centrale de Nantes
- École nationale supérieure des arts et industries textiles
- École nationale supérieure maritime
- École des hautes études en sciences sociales
- IFP School - École Nationale Supérieure du Pétrole et des Moteurs
- Institut National des Sciences Appliquées
  - Institut National des Sciences Appliquées de Rennes
  - Institut National des Sciences Appliquées de Rouen
  - Institut National des Sciences Appliquées de Strasbourg
- Université de technologie de Belfort-Montbéliard
- University of Technology of Troyes

=== Autonomous art schools ===
- European Academy of Art in Brittany (EESAB) (France)

== Private universities in France ==
=== Independent institutions ===
- Leonardo da Vinci University Center
- INSEEC U.
  - Centre d'Études Diplomatiques et Stratégiques

=== Catholic universities ===
- Catholic University of Paris
- Catholic University of Toulouse
- Catholic University of the West
- Catholic University of Lyon
- Lille Catholic University
- Catholic University of the Vendée
- Catholic University of Rennes

=== Others ===
- American University of Paris
- Chavagnes Studium
- American Graduate School in Paris
- Schiller International University
- Sigmund Freud University Paris

== See also ==
- Education in France
- List of universities and colleges by country
- Lists of universities and colleges
- G.I. American universities
- Franco-German University (UFA)
- Open access in France
