= INSA Euro-Méditerranée =

Engineering school in Fez, Morocco

Coordinates: 34.0450°N 5.0648°W

National Institute for Applied Sciences (INSA Euro-Méditerranée)
- Institut national des sciences appliquées Euro-Méditerranée
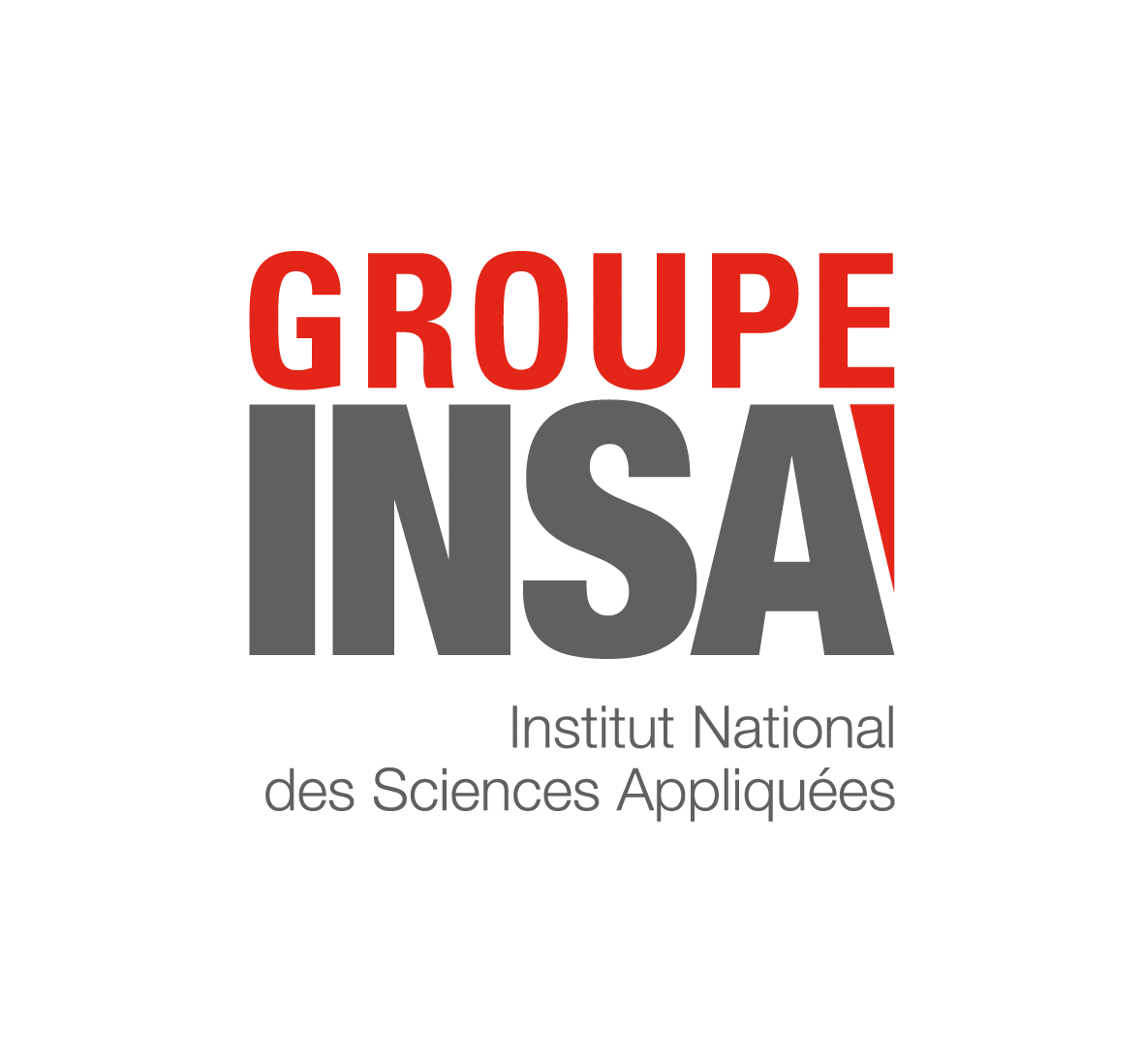
- Type: Public research university Engineering school
- Established: 2014-2022
- Parent institution: Institut national des sciences appliquées (INSA); Euro-Mediterranean University of Morocco (UEMF)
- Students: 228
- Location: Fez, Morocco
- Language: English-only & French-only instruction
- Website: http://www.insa-euromediterranee.org/fr/index.html

The Institut National des Sciences Appliquées de Euro-Méditerranée or INSA Euro-Méditerranée was an engineering school in Fez, Morocco, created in 2015 and closed in 2022. This school was one of the public engineering institutes that make up the INSA group and also part of Euro-Mediterranean University of Morocco.

== Academics ==
INSA Euro-Méditerranée was one of several engineering schools within the Institut National des Sciences Appliquées (INSA) network under the supervision of the Ministry of Higher Education (French: Ministère de l'Enseignement supérieur). Degrees from INSA are awarded by the "Commission des Titres" to deliver engineering degrees.

== INSA Campuses ==
=== France ===
- INSA Lyon
- INSA Rennes
- INSA Rouen
- INSA Strasbourg
- INSA Toulouse
- INSA Centre Val de Loire
- INSA Hauts-de-France

=== Morocco ===
- INSA Euro-Méditerranée
