= Établissement public à caractère scientifique, culturel et professionnel =

Educational institution in France

In French law, établissement public à caractère scientifique, culturel et professionnel (French pronunciation: [etablismɑ̃ pyblik a kaʁaktɛʁ sjɑ̃tifik kyltyʁɛl e pʁɔfɛsjɔnɛl], abbr. EPSCP; English: public scientific, cultural or professional establishment) is a formal category of more than one hundred and thirty public higher education institutes in the fields of sciences, culture and professional education. EPSCP have legal, administrative and financial autonomy in the French education system.

EPSCP category includes:

- public universities, per se
- four groups of other institutes with an operational status equivalent to a university.

== Organisation ==
EPSCP have full scientific autonomy to organise their research area, their curricula and degrees, up to and including doctoral degrees. They operate on the basis of a four-year objective roadmap that they define and agree with the national fund-granting authority and their achievements are assessed by a national evaluation agency for research and higher education. They also have the ability to create their own research foundations.

== Different types of EPSCP ==
The law establishes different groups of EPSCP, which are described below.

=== Universities ===
The 81 universities and institutes of technology are EPSCP led by a president and administered by a board of directors. They deliver bachelor, master and doctoral degrees as well as continuous education. They also contribute to national research programmes.

=== Autonomous higher education institutes ===
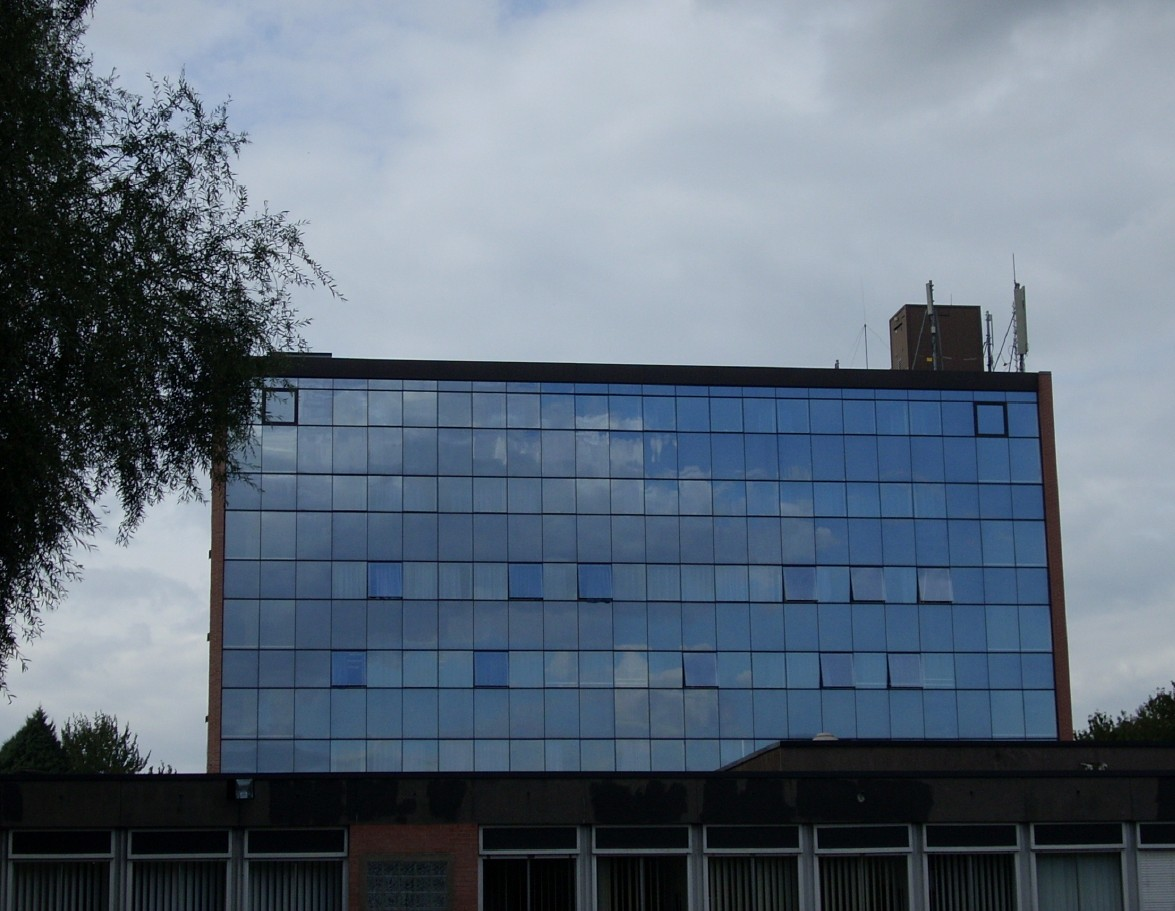
École centrale de Lille

These higher education institutes with a university-equivalent status are managed by a board of directors, assisted by a scientific council and a board of studies and academic life. Chairman of the Board of Directors is elected from among persons outside of the institute. The director is appointed by the Minister of Higher Education for a period of 5 years. The following institutions have this status:

- Centrale Graduate School
  - École centrale de Lille
  - École centrale de Lyon
  - École centrale de Marseille
  - École centrale de Nantes
- École nationale supérieure des arts et industries textiles
- Ecole nationale d'ingénieurs de Saint-Etienne
- Institut national des sciences appliquées are institutes of technology
  - INSA Lyon
  - INSA Toulouse
  - INSA Rennes
  - INSA Strasbourg
  - INSA Rouen
- Universities of Technology
  - The University of Technology of Belfort-Montbéliard (Université de Technologie de Belfort-Montbéliard or UTBM)
  - The University of Technology of Compiègne (Université de Technologie de Compiègne or UTC)
  - The University of Technology of Troyes (Université de Technologie de Troyes or UTT)
- Institut supérieur de mécanique de Paris

=== Écoles normales supérieures ===
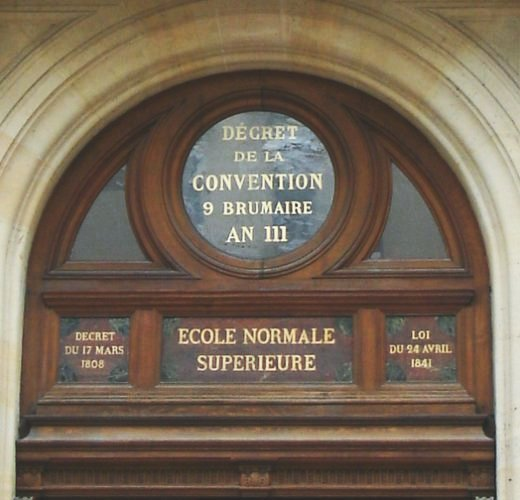
École Normale Supérieure in Paris

The four École normale supérieures are institutions educating researchers and professors.

The ENS have a board of directors and a scientific council, and are headed by an appointed director.

=== French institutes abroad ===
There are five French institutes operating outside France, hosting world-class researchers. These institutes are intended to provide an intellectual and material support to such researchers, including the presence of resource materials in French language. Some of these institutes can also provide accommodation for researchers.

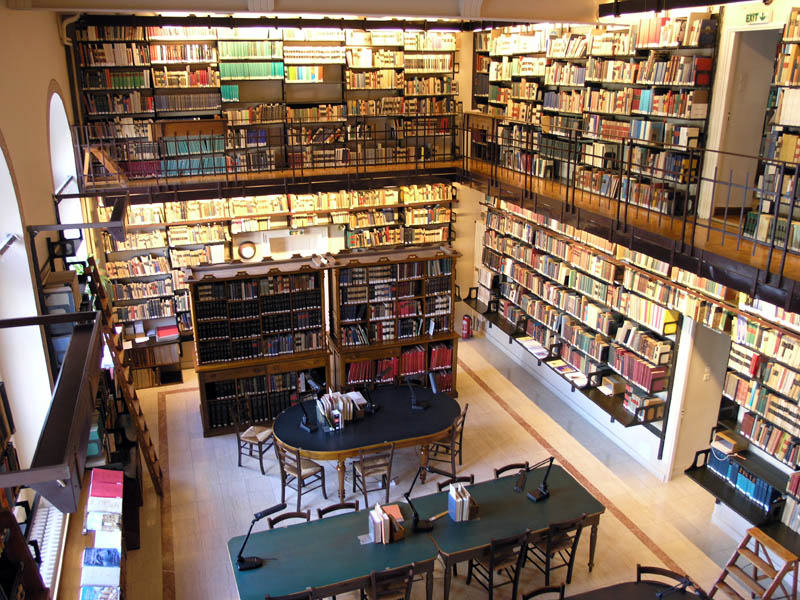
École française d'Athènes

The following institutions are included in this sub-group :

- Casa de Velázquez in Madrid
- École française d'Athènes
- École française d'Extrême-Orient
- École française de Rome
- Institut Français d'Archéologie Orientale in Cairo

=== Grands établissements ===
Twenty large institutions with diverse roles are included in this sub-group.
