= INSA Centre Val de Loire =

French engineering College

Coordinates: 47.5845°N 1.3257°E

National Institute for Applied Sciences (INSA CVL)
- Institut national des sciences appliquées Centre-Val de Loire
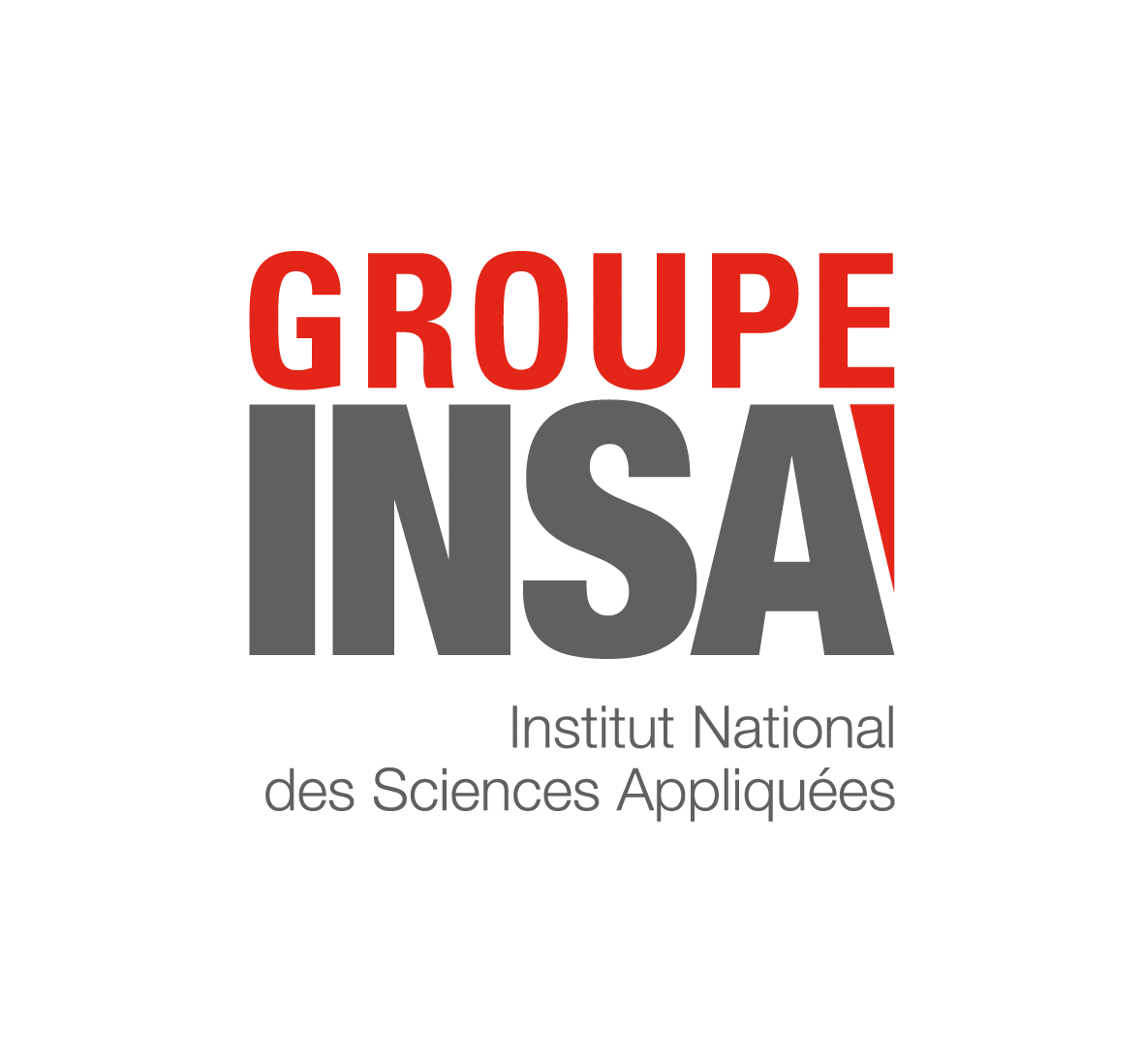
- Type: Grande école d'ingénieurs (public research university Engineering school)
- Established: 2014; 12 years ago
- Parent institution: Institut national des sciences appliquées (INSA)
- Academic affiliations: Conférence des Grandes écoles
- Director: Yann CHAMAILLARD
- Students: 1,660
- Location: France: Bourges, Blois
- Language: English-only & French-only instruction
- Website: www.insa-centrevaldeloire.fr/en/

INSA Centre-Val de Loire

The Institut National des Sciences Appliquées de Centre-Val de Loire (French pronunciation: [ɛ̃stity nɑsjɔnal de sjɑ̃s(z‿)aplike də sɑ̃tʁ val də lwaʁ]; "Centre-Val de Loire National Institute for Applied Sciences") or INSA CVL is one of the 210 Grande Ecole d’Ingénieurs, an engineering school, under the authority of the French Ministry of Higher Education and Research. Situated in the French region of Centre-Val de Loire, this school is one of the public engineering institutes that make up the INSA network.

== History ==
INSA CVL is the result of the merger in 2014 between the École nationale d'ingénieurs du Val de Loire (ENIVL), the École nationale supérieure d'ingénieurs de Bourges (ENSIB) and the École nationale supérieure de la nature et du paysage (ENSNP)

== Academics ==
INSA CVL is one of several engineering schools within the Institut National des Sciences Appliquées (INSA) network under the supervision of the Ministry of Higher Education and Research (France) (French: Ministère de l'Enseignement supérieur et de la Recherche). All INSA engineering schools are Grandes Écoles, a French institution of higher education that is separate from, but parallel and connected to the main framework of the French public university system. Similar to the Ivy League in the United States, Oxbridge in the UK, and C9 League in China, Grandes Écoles are elite academic institutions that admit students through an extremely competitive process. Alums go on to occupy elite positions within government, administration, and corporate firms in France.

Although INSA engineering schools are selective and can be more expensive than public universities in France, Grandes Écoles typically have much smaller class sizes and student bodies, and many of their programs are taught in English. International internships, study abroad opportunities, and close ties with government and the corporate world are a hallmark of the Grandes Écoles. Many of the top ranked schools in Europe are members of the Conférence des Grandes Écoles (CGE), as are INSA engineering schools. Degrees from INSA are accredited by the Conférence des Grandes Écoles and awarded by the Ministry of National Education (France) (French: Le Ministère de L'éducation Nationale).

== INSA Campuses ==
=== France ===
- INSA Lyon
- INSA Rennes
- INSA Rouen
- INSA Strasbourg
- INSA Toulouse
- INSA Centre-Val de Loire
- INSA Hauts-de-France

=== Morocco ===
- INSA Euro-Méditerranée
