= Institut national de recherche sur les transports et leur sécurité =

French national transport and safety institute

Coordinates: 48.8603°N 2.3714°E

Institut national de recherche sur les transports et leur sécurité (INRETS) is the former French national institute for transport and safety research. INRETS and the LCPC (the French Central Laboratory of Roads and Bridges) have been merged since January 2011 to form a new research institute: IFSTTAR (the French Institute for Sciences and Technologies of Transport, Planning and Networks).

== Research area ==
INRETS research roadmap includes the following areas:

- Safety of people transportation systems
  - Health and road safety (epidemiology, accident, biomechanics, psychology and sociology of human behavior)
  - Public policies on risk
  - Technology and human factors: human-machine cooperation
- Innovative transportation systems
  - Mobility of people, lifestyles, territories (analysis of mobility, acceptability and conditions change, networks and regional planning)
  - Goods transportation
  - Traffic management systems and network optimisation methods
- Reliability and sustainability of transport systems, optimisation of energy consumption, reduction of environmental impact
  - Safety and efficiency of transport; guided transportation systems
  - Communication, navigation and surveillance, diagnosis and maintenance
  - Evaluation and reduction of emissions of greenhouse gases and pollutants
  - Evaluation and reduction of transport noise – multi-nuisance analysis
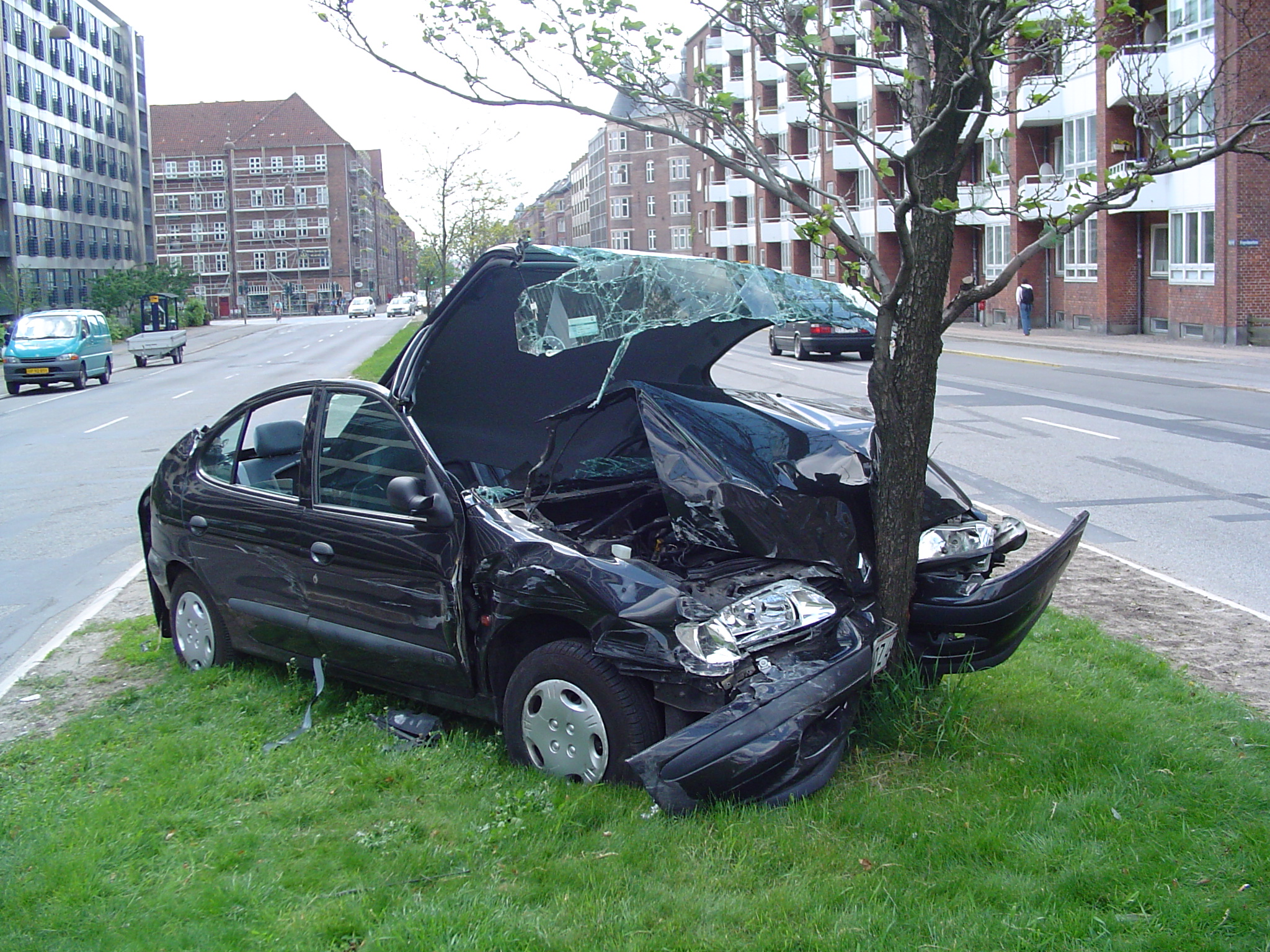

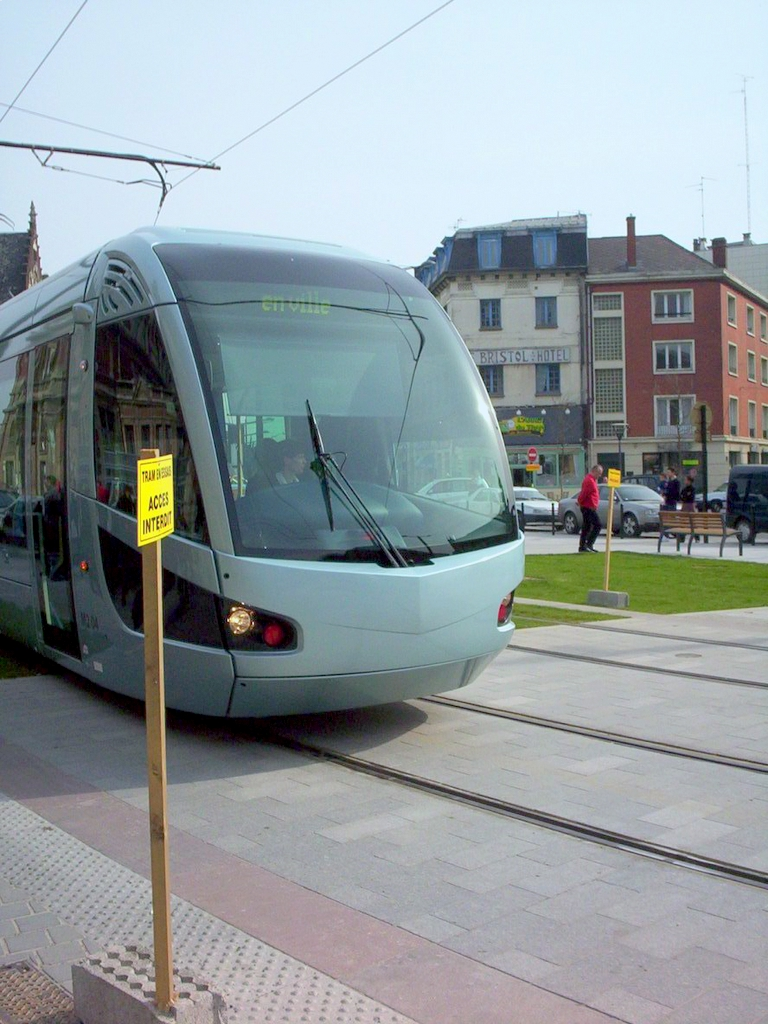

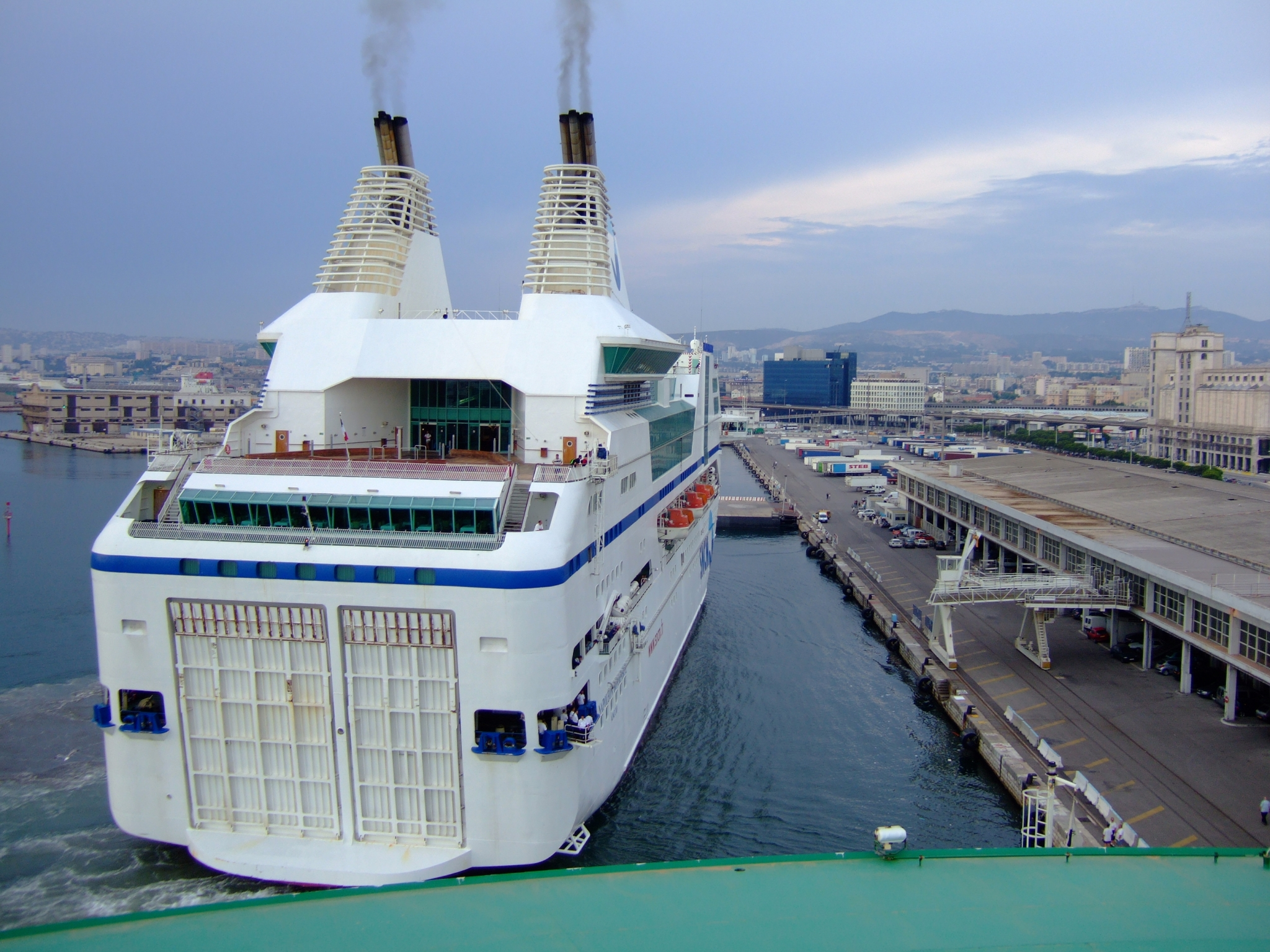

== Organisation ==
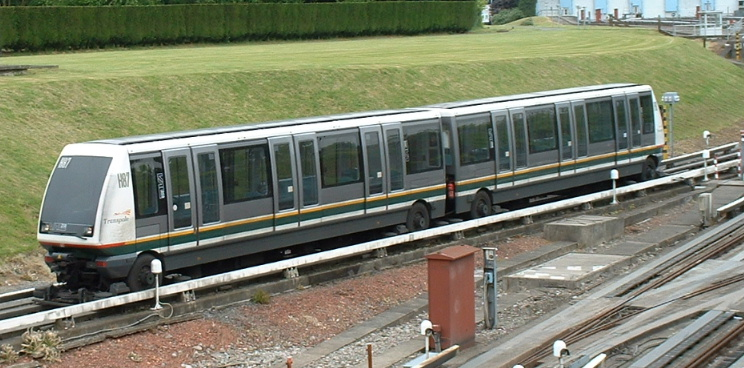
VAL Automated People mover (Véhicule Automatique Léger)

The INRETS research institute is organised as a French Scientific and Technical Research Public Establishment and includes the following sites:

- Bron (Lyon)
- Marne-la-Vallée
- Marseille
- Salon-de-Provence
- Satory
- Villeneuve-d'Ascq (Lille)

== Research cooperations ==
- INRETS-Villeneuve-d'Ascq is associated to the research on transportation systems as a member of the PRES Université Lille Nord de France, with research contribution from École centrale de Lille, ENSIAME and University of Valenciennes and Hainaut-Cambresis.
- INRETS-Marne-la-Vallée is associated to research on transportation systems with support from École nationale des ponts et chaussées.
