= Euromed =

Euromed may refer to:

- Euromed (train)
- EuroMed (EU Med Group)
- Euro-Mediterranean University of Fez
- Barcelona Euro-Mediterranean Conference
- Euro-Mediterranean Human Rights Monitor
- Euro-Mediterranean Parliamentary Assembly

== See also ==
- EU Med Group
