= Euro-Mediterranean University =

Euro-Mediterranean University may refer to

- Euro-Mediterranean University of Slovenia
- Euro-Mediterranean University of Morocco
