= French universities =

For French universities, see:

- Lists of universities in France
- List of universities and colleges in France

== See also ==
- Grandes écoles
