= Sylvie Thiébaux =

French-Australian computer scientist

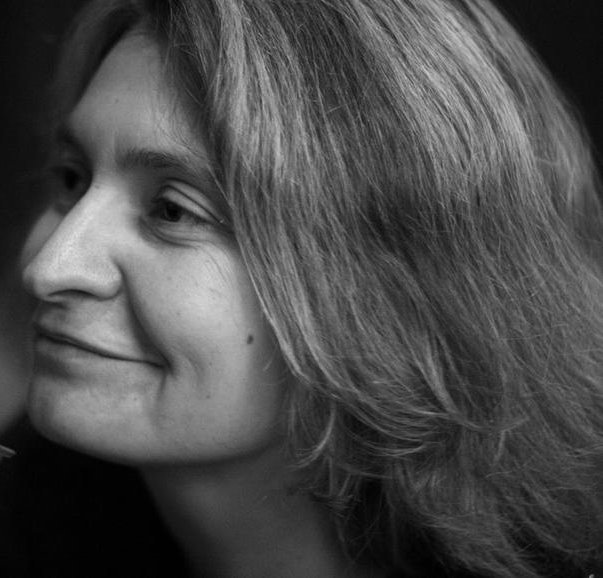
Photo of Sylvie Thiébaux.

Sylvie Thiébaux is a French-Australian computer scientist, whose research in artificial intelligence focuses on automated planning and scheduling, diagnosis, and automated reasoning under uncertainty. She is a professor of computer science at the Australian National University, and co-editor-in-chief of the journal Artificial Intelligence.

== Education and career ==
Thiébaux earned an engineering diploma from the Institut national des sciences appliquées de Rennes in 1991, and a master's degree from the Florida Institute of Technology in 1992. She completed a Ph.D. in 1995 at the University of Rennes 1, under the direction of Marie-Odile Cordier.

After working as a researcher for the French Institute for Research in Computer Science and Automation (INRIA) and CSIRO in Australia, she joined the Australian National University in 2001. She was affiliated as a researcher with NICTA and its successor within CSIRO, Data61, from 2003 to 2018, and directed the NICTA Canberra laboratory from 2009 to 2011.

== Recognition ==
Thiébaux was named a Fellow of the Association for the Advancement of Artificial Intelligence in 2020, "for significant contributions to algorithms and applications of planning and scheduling, and service to the AI community".
