= Marie-Odile Cordier =

French computer scientist (born 1950)

Marie-Odile Cordier (born 1950) is a retired French computer scientist specializing in artificial intelligence, and in particular in the diagnosis of discrete event dynamic systems. Before retiring, she was a professor at the University of Rennes 1, where she headed the DREAM team, a project for diagnosis, reasoning, and modeling of discrete event systems at the Research Institute of Computer Science and Random Systems (IRISA).

== Education and career ==
Cordier is originally from Paris, where she was born in 1950. She studied computer science at Paris-Sud University, earning a doctorat de troisième cycle in 1979 under the direction of Jacques Pitrat and a doctorat d'état in 1986 under the direction of Daniel Kayser. She completed a habilitation at Paris-Sud University in 1996.

After working as an associate professor at Paris-Sud University, she moved to the University of Rennes as a full professor in 1988. Her doctoral students at Rennes have included Sylvie Thiébaux and Marie-Christine Rousset.

== Recognition ==
Cordier was named as a fellow of the European Association for Artificial Intelligence (formerly ECCAI) in 2001. She was the 2015 recipient of the lifetime achievement award of the International Workshop on Principles of Diagnosis (DX).
