= IFSTTAR =

French public research institution

Institut français des sciences et technologies des transports, de l'aménagement et des réseaux (IFSTTAR)
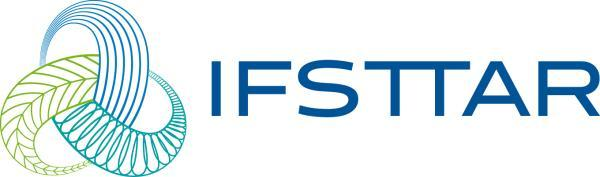
- Type: Public Scientific and Technical Research Establishment
- Purpose: French Institute of Science and Technology for Transport, Development and Networks
- Region served: France
- Official language: French
- Staff: 600
- Website: www.ifsttar.fr

The French Institute of Science and Technology for Transport, Development and Networks (French: Institut français des sciences et technologies des transports, de l'aménagement et des réseaux, IFSTTAR) is a public research institution (a Public Scientific and Technical Research Establishment) created in 2011. It results from the merger of The French National Institute for Transport and Safety Research (INRETS) and the French Central Laboratory of Roads and Bridges (LCPC).

The IFSTTAR is an associate member of University of Paris-Est and Université Lille Nord de France.

== Sites ==
- Lille-Villeneuve d'Ascq
- Paris
- Marne-la-Vallée
- Versailles-Satory
- Nantes
- Lyon-Bron
- Marseille-Salon de Provence
