= Public Scientific and Technical Research Establishment =

Public scientific research establishments

A Public Scientific and Technical Research Establishment (French: Établissement public à caractère scientifique et technologique, EPST) is a category of public research institutes. In France, they were authorized by Law No. 82-610 of 15 July 1982. In Algeria, they were authorized by decree No. 99-256 of 16 November 1999.

== List of EPST in France ==
- Institut national de recherche en sciences et technologies pour l'environnement et l'agriculture (IRSTEA, also formerly known as Cemagref)
- Centre national de la recherche scientifique (CNRS)
- Institut national d'études démographiques (INED)
- Institut national de recherche agronomique (INRA)
- Institut de recherche pour le développement (IRD, ex-ORSTOM)
- Institut français des sciences et technologies des transports, de l'aménagement et des réseaux (IFSTTAR)
- Institut national de la santé et de la recherche médicale (INSERM)
- National Institute for Research in Computer Science and Control (INRIA)

== Former EPST ==
- Institut national de recherche sur les transports et leur sécurité (INRETS)
- Laboratoire central des ponts et chaussées (LCPC)

== Research ==
A research collaboration between an EPST and a university laboratory is called a mixed research unit (Unité mixte de recherche or UMR).

== List of EPST in Algeria ==
- National Centre of Research in Social and Cultural Anthropology
