= National Centre of Research in Social and Cultural Anthropology =

Algerian research organization

المركز الوطني للبحث في الأنثروبولوجيا الاجتماعية والثقافية Centre national de recherche en anthropolgie sociale et culturelle
- Abbreviation: CRASC
- Predecessor: Unité de recherche en anthropologie sociale et culturelle (URASC)
- Formation: May 23, 1992; 34 years ago
- Type: Governmental organisation
- Legal status: EPST
- Headquarters: Oran
- Location: Technopol of l'USTO
- Coordinates: 35.703633°N 0.573995°W
- Region served: Algeria, Maghreb, Africa, Arab world
- Official language: Arabic, English and French
- Director: Nouria Benghabrit-Remaoun
- Parent organization: Ministry of higher education and scientific research
- Subsidiaries: Branch in University of Mentouri
- Website: www.crasc.dz/index.php/en/

The National Centre of Research in Social and Cultural Anthropology (French: Centre national de recherche en anthropologie sociale et culturelle, CRASC) is an Algerian governmental research organisation in social sciences created by the decree 92-215 on May 23, 1992. The Centre operates under the aegis of the Ministry of higher education and scientific research, its headquarters is located in Oran.

The primary missions of the CRASC are:

- Research
- Education
- Studies and assessments
- Editing and enhancement

The CRASC publishes scientific works, in particular through its review Insaniyat which is referenced by the web platform for journals and book collections in the humanities and social sciences Revues.org. Contributions in English are mainly disseminated through The Africa Revue of Books (ISSN 0851-7592); the journal of the Codesria is published twice yearly. Its editorial production is piloted by the Forum for Social Studies (FSS), based in Addis Ababa, Ethiopia, with the active support of the CRASC.

In 2012, to commemorate Algeria's 50 years of independence, the CRASC organized the interdisciplinary colloquium “1962, A World ”, in collaboration with the overseas office of The American Institute for Maghrib Studies (AIMS) which is The Centre d'études maghrébines en Algérie (CEMA) located in Oran. Johns Hopkins University also participated through the Organization committee, including the contribution of the School for Advanced Studies in the Social Sciences and the Centre national de la recherche scientifique.
