= Marie-Christine Rousset =

French computer scientist

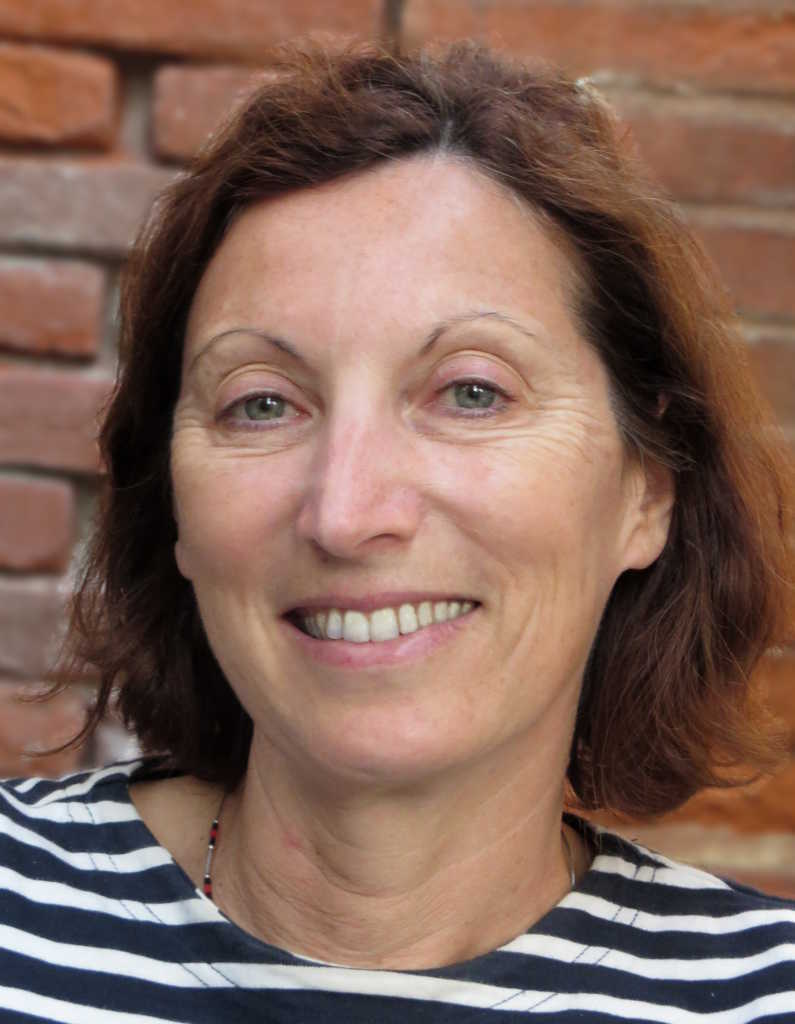
- Rousset in 2020
- Born: 1958 (age 67–68)
- Occupation: Computer scientist

Marie-Christine Rousset (born 1958) is a French computer scientist whose research involves knowledge representation, the semantic web, description logic, and data mining. She is a professor of computer science at Grenoble Alpes University, and a senior member of the Institut Universitaire de France.

== Education and career ==
Rousset graduated in 1980 from the École normale supérieure in Fontenay-aux-Roses (then a girls' school), with an agrégation in mathematics. She studied computer science at Paris-Sud University, earning a doctorat de troisième cycle in 1983 and a doctorat d'état in 1988 under the direction of Marie-Odile Cordier.

She was a researcher at the Laboratory for Computer Science (LIR) at Paris-Sud University from 1981 to 1989, and a professor there from 1989 to 2005. In 2005 she moved to Joseph Fourier University, which in 2016 merged with two other institutions in Grenoble to become Grenoble Alpes University.

== Book ==
Rousset is a coauthor of the book Web Data Management (with Serge Abiteboul, Ioana Manolescu, Philippe Rigaux, and Pierre Senellart, Cambridge University Press, 2011).

== Recognition ==
Rousset was elected as a junior member of the Institut Universitaire de France in 1997, promoted to senior member in 2011, and renewed in 2016. She is a fellow of the European Association for Artificial Intelligence (formerly the ECCAI), elected in 2005.

She was named as a knight in the Ordre national du Mérite in 2011.
