= Artificial Intelligence (journal) =

Journal published by Elsevier

- Discipline: Artificial intelligence
- Language: English
- Edited by: Michael Wooldridge, Sylvie Thiébaux

Publication details
- History: 1970–present
- Publisher: Elsevier (Netherlands)
- Frequency: 18/year
- Open access: Delayed; after 4 years
- Impact factor: 4.6 (2024)

Standard abbreviations
- ISO 4: Artif. Intell.
- MathSciNet: Artificial Intelligence

Indexing
- ISSN: 0004-3702
- OCLC no.: 38524874

Links
- Journal homepage; Online access

Artificial Intelligence is a scientific journal covering research in artificial intelligence. It was established in 1970 and is published by Elsevier. The journal is abstracted and indexed in Scopus and the Science Citation Index. The journal had a 2024 Impact Factor of 4.6, and its CiteScore for 2021–2024 was 15.0. In 2025, the journal had an Impact Factor of 4.7.

The journal publishes research that advances artificial intelligence through novel methods, theories, and principled approaches. It covers a broad range of AI topics and emphasizes novelty, technical soundness, and demonstrated effectiveness. Application-oriented papers are expected to show how novel AI methods provide meaningful improvements over conventional approaches.
