= Euro-Mediterranean University of Fez =

Private university in Fez, Morocco

- Université Euro-Méditerranéenne de Fès
- Type: Private, non-profit
- Established: 2014; 12 years ago
- Affiliation: Union for the Mediterranean
- Location: Fez, Morocco
- Campus: Suburban, eco-campus
- Website: ueuromed.org

The Euro-Mediterranean University of Fez (UEMF) is a university located in Fez, Morocco. The university was created to foster academic cooperation between countries of the Euro-Mediterranean region. The project was approved by the Union for the Mediterranean (UfM) in 2012, and the institution officially opened in 2014.

The university is home to the Institut National des Sciences Appliquées Euro-Méditerranée (INSA Euro-Méditerranée), an engineering school established in partnership with the French Institut national des sciences appliquées (Groupe INSA), one of the largest networks of engineering institutions in France.

== History ==
The idea for the Euro-Mediterranean University of Fez originated as part of a broader initiative to promote regional cooperation through education, research, and intercultural dialogue. The project was officially endorsed by the 43 member states of the Union for the Mediterranean in July 2012. The university was designed to serve as a platform for collaboration between institutions from Europe and the southern Mediterranean, with a particular focus on innovation and sustainable development.

The university opened its doors in 2014. It has since developed a number of academic programs and partnerships, including joint degrees and research collaborations.

== See also ==
- List of universities in Morocco
- Education in Morocco
