= École nationale supérieure d'ingénieurs en informatique, automatique, mécanique, énergétique et électronique =

École Nationale Supérieure d'Ingénieurs en Informatique Automatique Mécanique Énergétique et Électronique
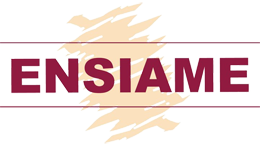
- Other names: ENSIAME
- Type: grande école
- Established: 2002 (merger)
- Parent institution: University of Valenciennes and Hainaut-Cambresis
- Director: Daniel Coutellier
- Students: 1,000
- Postgraduates: French traditional equivalent of a Master's Degree, Masters, Ph.D
- Location: Valenciennes, France; 50°19′43″N 3°30′52″E
- Website: www.univ-valenciennes.fr/ensiame

The ENSIAME (École Nationale Supérieure d'Ingénieurs en Informatique Automatique Mécanique Énergétique et Électronique) is one of the French "grandes écoles" of Engineering. It is located in the city of Valenciennes, in the north of France.

Born from the merger between the ENSIMEV, the EIGIP and the ISIV, it educates every-year 200 engineers in 3 areas:

- Mechanics-Energetics
- Computing and Management of Systems
- Mechatronics

It offers additional courses which complement the engineering courses.

- A Master's specialised in Rail and Transport Systems
- A Diploma in Technological Research (D.R.T)
