= Institut national des sciences appliquées de Rouen =

French educational institution

Coordinates: 49°23′09″N 1°04′06″E

INSA Rouen Normandie
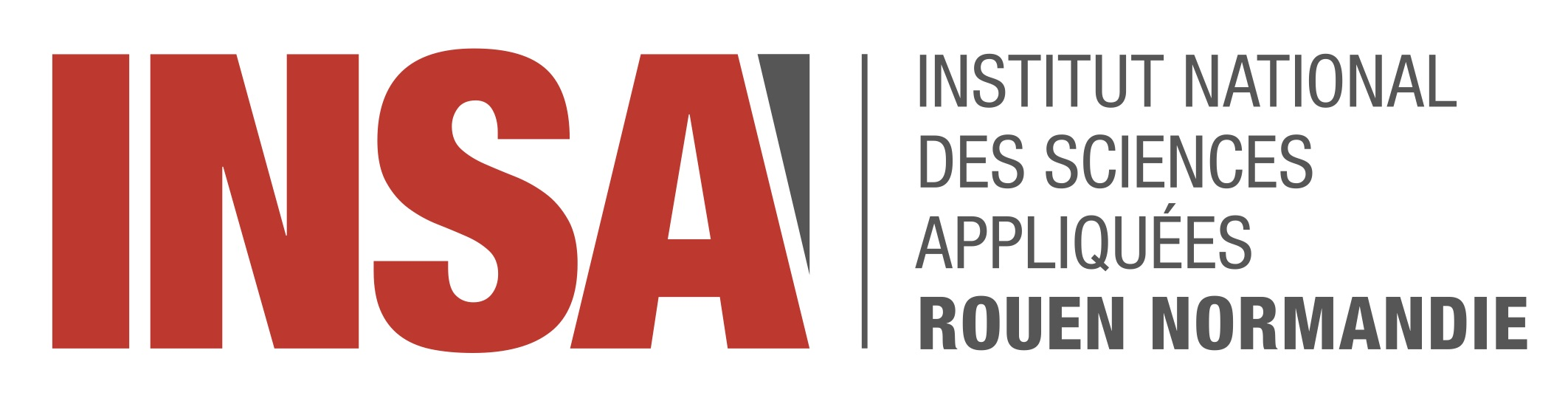
- Motto: À taille humaine, à l'échelle du monde
- Type: Grande École
- Established: 1985
- Affiliations: CGE, CDEFI, fédération Gay-Lussac and comUE Normandie Université
- President: Mourad Abdelkrim Boukhalfa
- Students: 2100
- Address: 685 Avenue de l'Université, 76800 Saint-Étienne-du-Rouvray, France, Rouen, France
- Language: French
- Website: www.insa-rouen.fr

The Institut National des Sciences Appliquées de Rouen (French pronunciation: [ɛ̃stity nɑsjɔnal de sjɑ̃s(z‿)aplike də ʁwɑ̃]; "Rouen National Institute for Applied Sciences") or INSA Rouen Normandie is a French Grande école, that is to say a five-year curriculum which aims to train highly skilled engineers who possess humane qualities and are well versed in the primary areas of science and engineering. Located in Saint-Étienne-du-Rouvray, on the Madrillet technology center campus, in the suburbs of Rouen, this school accommodates more than 2000 students who specialize in 10 fields.

== Departments of engineering ==
- Chemistry and chemical engineering
- Mathematical engineering
- Mechanical engineering
- Industrial and innovative Performance (cooperative training course)
- Security processes performance (cooperative training course)
- Structures of the information systems
- Energetics and propulsion engineering
- Energy performance (cooperative training course)
- Civil engineering
- Industrial and Environmental Risks Management

== Other INSA ==
- INSA Lyon
- INSA Toulouse
- INSA Rennes
- INSA Strasbourg

== See also ==
- INSA
