= Institut national des sciences appliquées =

French public institution dedicated to Higher Education and Research

Institut National des sciences appliquées (Groupe INSA)
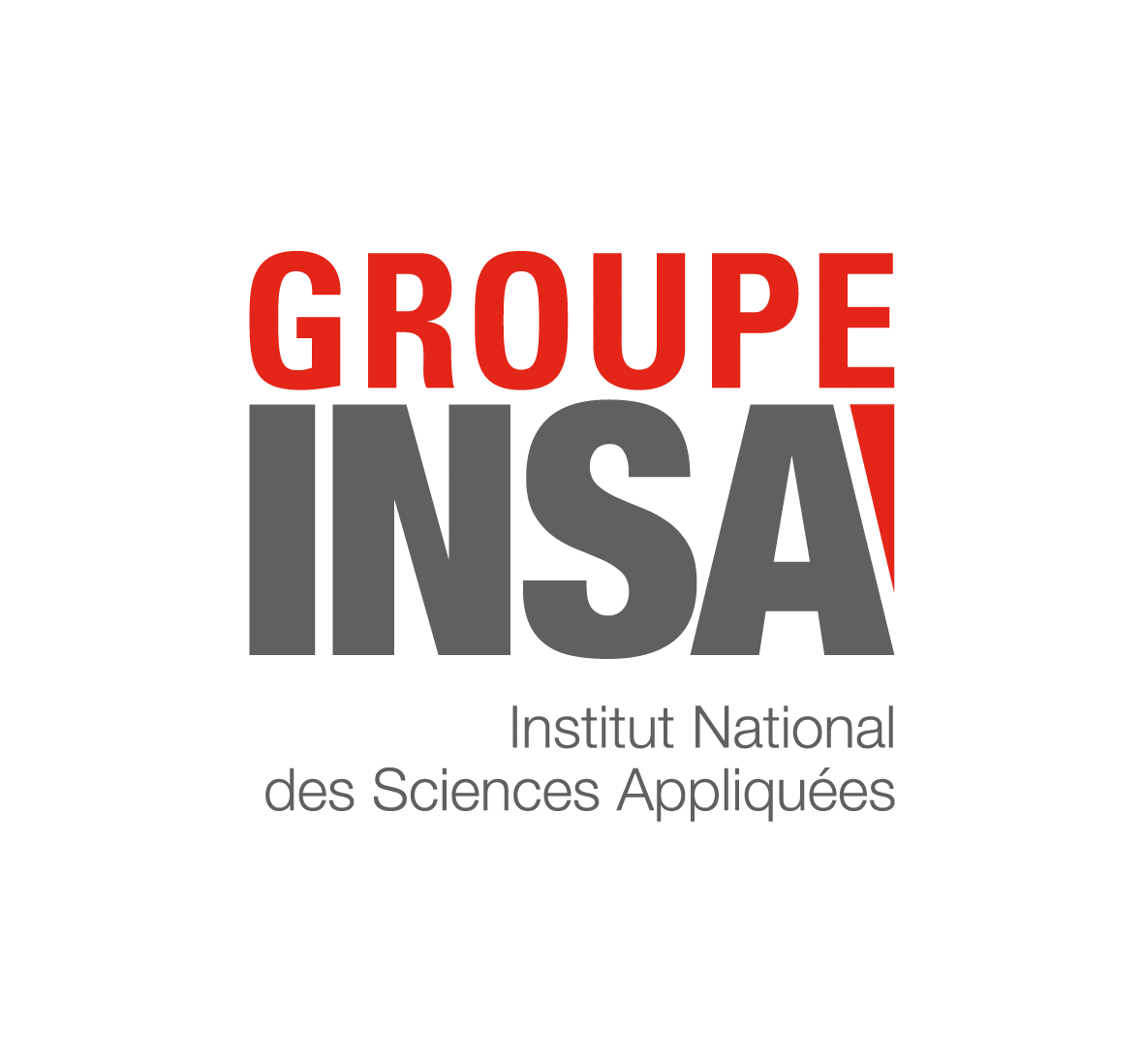
- Type: Institute of Grandes écoles d'ingénieurs (public research university Engineering schools)
- Established: 1957
- Students: 16,700+ 1,200 Ph.D. 34% female 27% international
- Location: INSA Lyon; INSA Toulouse; INSA Rennes; INSA Strasbourg; INSA Rouen-Normandie; INSA Centre Val de Loire; INSA Hauts-de-France
- Website: groupe-insa.fr

INSA campuses in France

The Institut National des Sciences Appliquées (French pronunciation: [ɛ̃stity nɑsjɔnal de sjɑ̃s(z‿)aplike], INSA; "National Institute for Applied Sciences") is a French engineering university.

There are seven INSA establishments organised as a network and located in major French regional cities Lyon, Rennes, Rouen, Strasbourg, Toulouse, Valenciennes, Blois and Bourges. All INSAs share the same philosophy, at the same time preserving an individual identity based on their respective histories, origins, economic environments and on poles of excellence developed from specific competences.

The INSA network represents the largest engineer training group in France: 12% of all engineers who obtain their degree in France each year graduate from one of the INSA establishments. To date, almost 50,000 INSA engineers contribute to the social and economic fabric worldwide. The INSA are public establishments with a scientific, cultural and professional orientation. They are under the aegis of the Ministry of Higher Education and are accredited by the "Commission des Titres" to deliver engineering degrees.

== Academics ==
About 20% of French engineering students enroll in a school directly after a high school diploma (Baccalauréat) without first attending a post-high school preparatory school (Classe préparatoire aux grandes écoles or prépa), and then attend for five years of study leading to a master's degree. The Groupe INSA Grandes Écoles engineering schools are selective, and unlike French universities they do not offer open enrollment, but they do allow for direct enrollment either after high school or after graduating from a post- high school prépa. International students with a high school or bachelor's degree may also apply directly to INSA, and 27% of students are from outside of France. In 2022, annual tuition for a master's degree was: €601 for French; €1,900 for other Europeans; €5,000 for all others.

Although INSA engineering schools are selective and can be more expensive than public universities in France, Grandes Écoles typically have much smaller class sizes and student bodies, and many of their programs are taught in English. International internships, study abroad opportunities, and close ties with government and the corporate world are a hallmark of the Grandes Écoles. Many of the top ranked schools in Europe are members of the Conférence des Grandes Écoles (CGE), as are INSA engineering schools. Degrees from INSA are accredited by the Conférence des Grandes Écoles and awarded by the ministry of higher education (French: Ministère de l'enseignement supérieur).

== Prestige ==
All Groupe INSA engineering schools are under the supervision of the Ministry of higher education (French: Ministère de l'enseignement supérieur) and are Grandes Écoles, a French institution of higher education that is separate from, but parallel and connected to the main framework of the French public university system. Similar to the Ivy League in the United States, Oxbridge in the UK, and C9 League in China, Grandes Écoles are elite academic institutions that admit students through an extremely competitive process. Alums go on to occupy elite positions within government, administration, and corporate firms in France.

Of the engineering schools that offer direct entry after receiving a baccalaureate, INSA are considered among the most selective and the number of applications has steadily increased over the years.

Parcoursup 2020:

Engineering Schools	Number of spaces / applicants (2020)	Acceptance 2019	Acceptance 2020	Acceptance 2021
INSA Lyon	690 / 18,190	11.4%	10.4%	9.9%
INSA Toulouse	250 / 16,899	11.0%	10.1%	11.7%
INSA Rennes	220 / 14,203	17.7%	16.0%	16.0%
INSA-Strasbourg	200 / 12,505	24.0%	21.1%	21.7%
INSA Rouen	240 / 12,277	20.5%	18.1%	21.7%
INSA Hauts-de-France	180 / 8,763	53.1%	35.8%	49.3%
INSA Centre-Val-de-Loire	195 / 9,222	50.7%	43.3%	50.4%
INSA Toulouse-Sciences Po double degree	24 / 1,076		2.4%	9.6%
INSA Rennes-Sciences Po double degree	40 / ?		6.8%	15.3%

== Campuses ==
- INSA Lyon
- INSA Rennes
- INSA Rouen
- INSA Strasbourg
- INSA Toulouse
- INSA Centre Val de Loire
- INSA Hauts-de-France
