= Institut national des sciences appliquées de Rennes =

Public engineering school in Rennes, France

INSA Rennes
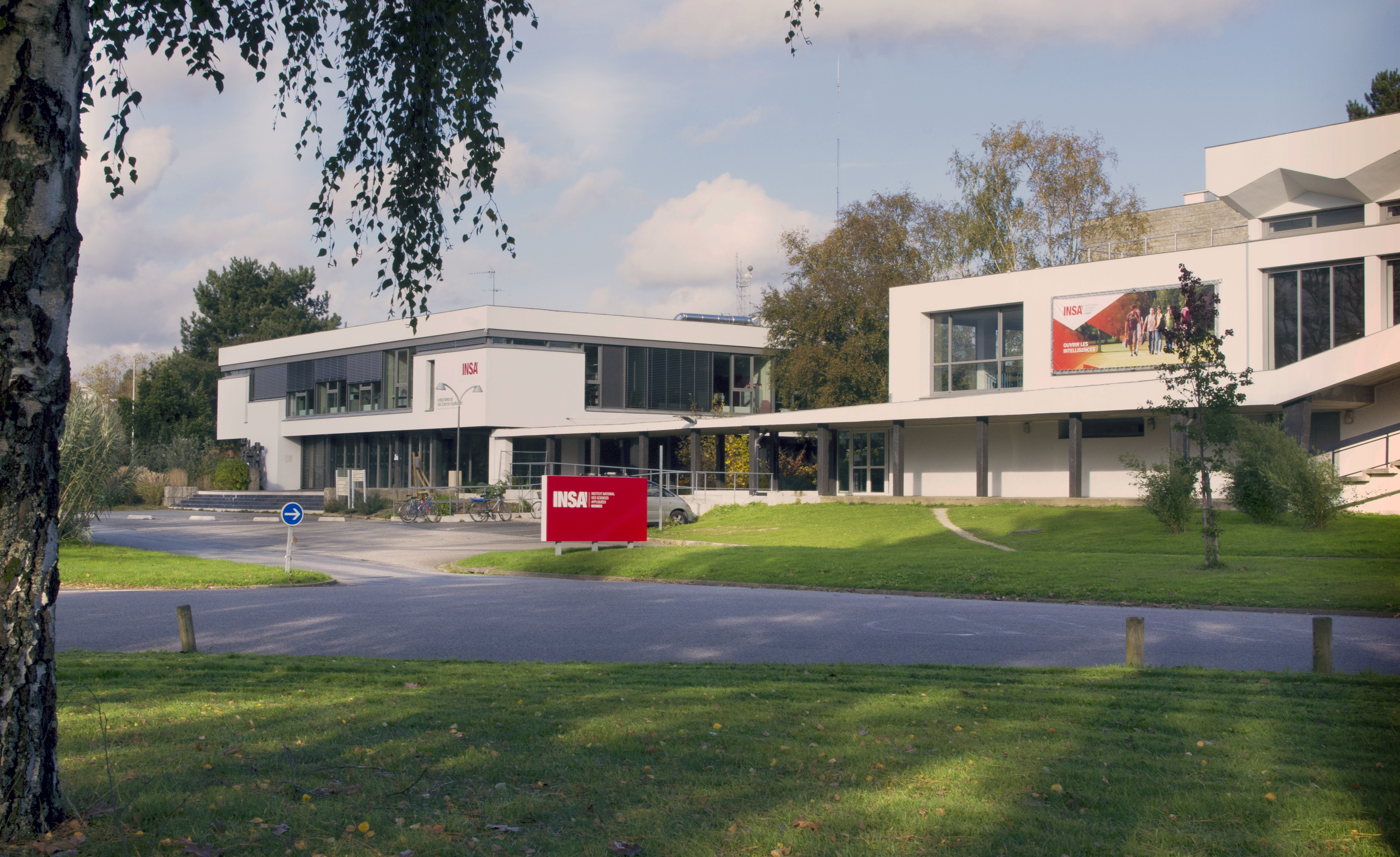
- Type: Public
- Established: 1966
- President: Vincent Brunie
- Students: 1700
- Location: Rennes, France; 48°07′17″N 1°38′05″W
- Campus: Beaulieu
- Website: www.insa-rennes.fr

- Rennes

The Institut National des Sciences Appliquées de Rennes (French pronunciation: [ɛ̃stity nɑsjɔnal de sjɑ̃s(z‿)aplike də ʁɛn]; "Rennes National Institute for Applied Sciences") or INSA Rennes is a Grande École d'Ingénieurs, a School of Engineering, under the authority of the French Ministry of Education and Research.

It is located on the Beaulieu campus in the east of Rennes, it is a part of the INSA group, which trains nearly 12% of all French engineers each year. Founded in 1966 to train highly qualified engineers, support continuing education, and conduct research and testing, it is the biggest engineering school in the region of Brittany. The five-year curriculum aims at training engineers who possess humane qualities and are well versed in the primary areas of science and engineering. The school accommodates 1,400 students in engineering.

The 5-year education is divided into two parts:

- the first cycle, a highly selective part of the studies which aims at giving the basis for future engineering studies that takes 2 years
- the second cycle, where the students have 7 specialties to choose from and will study their choice of specialty for 3 more years

== First cycle ==
The five year academic curriculum starts with a foundation course (preparatory cycle) where students focus on fundamental sciences (maths, physics, chemistry, mechanics and computer sciences) and then progressively concentrate on specialized areas in science and technology. This generalist preparatory cycle ensures that all INSA engineers acquire a solid background in terms of skills and competence, thus allowing them to reorient their career independently of their initial specialization. The first cycle is the highly selective part of the studies. During the first year the examinations are very hard to test if students are able to continue with their engineering studies.

Some special sections are available :

- Filière Internationale (International branch): only for the first cycle, the international branch consists of approximately 100 students, made up with around half of them French students and other half coming from non-French speaking country, mainly Turkey, China, and Vietnam.
- Filière INSA - Sciences Po Rennes: partnership with Rennes Institute of Political Studies (also known as Sciences Po Rennes), aiming to train high-level executives capable of working in both engineering and governance.
- Filière Arts - Études (Art-with-studies branch): provides 4 sub-branches of studies: music, plastic arts, theatre, and lighting.
- Filière Excellence Sportive (Sporting excellence branch): combines engineering training with high-level sport, aimed for student who are high-level athletes registered on the lists of the Ministry of Sports and national-level athletes. This course adapts the studies to have time to practice sport and is therefore completed in 6 years instead of 5.

== Second cycle ==
The second cycle offers 7 different engineering specialties:

- Computer Science
- Mechanical Engineering and Automatism
- Civil Engineering
- Electronics and Computer Engineering
- Materials Science & Engineering
- Communication Systems & Networks
- Mathematical Engineering

On top of this 7 specialties, INSA Rennes offers more possibilities to its students with programs like:

- Double degrees
- Work-study with a company
- The Research Innovation Entrepreneurship course
- Scientific research specialized masters

== Student life ==
The school is located on the Beaulieu campus, served by multiple bus routes and the metro line B.

The 17-hectare campus of INSA Rennes includes:

- Four residential buildings (820 rooms and 171 studios)
- A restaurant (serving lunch and dinner on weekdays)
- A library
- A multimedia centre with 100 freely accessible workstations, connected to the Internet and providing access to many hardware and software resources
- A student bar, with a capacity of 800 places
- A student cafeteria
- The "Halle Francis Querné", a general-purpose sports hall with a floor space of approximately 2,000 m^{2}
- 2 self-service laundromats for students

== Associations ==
- AEIR - INSA Rennes Engineering Students Association

With a 900-strong membership, the AEIR offers students a wide range of sports, leisure and cultural activities

- AS (Association Sportive)

The AS offers students the opportunity to partake in organised sports events and other sporting activities of a more or less competitive nature.

- Ouest INSA – Junior Entreprise

The goal of the association is to link engineering students with French companies in order to lead small projects. This allows students to get professional experiences and involvement in the business world.

- FSIR – Formula Student INSA Rennes

Their aim is to take part in the worldwide Formula Student challenge and design, conceive and build a single-seat racing car.

- Forum Grand Ouest

FGO is an association which gets students in touch with companies based in the West of France. Each year, a large number of companies come to the campus where students can discuss with them and even get job opportunities.

- EAI – Echange Afrique-INSA

The EAI carries out numerous aid projects in developing countries (construction of schools, etc.).

- Association 1,2,3,4 L

A gateway to participating in the humanitarian "4L Trophy" for 4L Citroën cars. Teams carry aid parcels destined for people in need in Africa.

- Rock'n Solex

Students help to organise the Rock'n Solex music festival.

...

== Notable students ==
- Violette Dorange, professional sailor, Youngest of the Vendée Globe 2024.
- Nguyễn Tiến Trung, Vietnamese cyber-dissident (graduated in 2007)
- Jérémy Roy, cyclist (graduated in 2007)
- Armel Le Cléac'h, professional navigator and sea captain, IMOCA world champion in 2008
- Sylvie Thiébaux, French-Australian computer scientist (graduated in 1991)
