= Institut national des sciences appliquées de Lyon =

French higher education institution

Coordinates: 45°46′53″N 4°52′20″E

INSA Lyon
- Motto: L'imagination technologique
- Motto in English: Technological imagination
- Type: Grande École
- Established: 1957
- Endowment: €162.3 millions
- President: Frédéric Fotiadu
- Academic staff: 718
- Administrative staff: 677
- Students: 6,300
- Doctoral students: 613
- Location: Villeurbanne, France
- Campus: LyonTech – La Doua
- Website: www.insa-lyon.fr

The Institut National des Sciences Appliquées de Lyon (French pronunciation: [ɛ̃stity nɑsjɔnal de sjɑ̃s(z‿)aplike də ljɔ̃]; "Lyon National Institute for Applied Sciences") or INSA Lyon is a French grande école and engineering school. The university is located on the La Doua – LyonTech campus, in a cluster of science and technological universities and Grandes Écoles. La Doua is located in Villeurbanne, a suburb of Lyon.

The school was founded in 1957 to train highly qualified engineers, support continuing education, and conduct research. The five-year curriculum aims at training engineers who possess human qualities and are well versed in the primary areas of science and engineering. Students may pursue a PhD upon completion of the 5-year curriculum. Graduates from INSA Lyon are called Insaliens.

== Preparatory level ==
The five-year academic curriculum starts with a two-year preparatory cycle where students focus on fundamental sciences such as mathematics, physics, chemistry, mechanics and computer science. This cycle aims to provide INSA engineers with a wide range of skills and competencies, thus allowing them to redirect their careers independently of their initial specialization.

Several special sections are available:

- EURINSA, with half of the students coming from other European countries
- AMERINSA, with half of the students coming from Latin American countries (mainly Brazil, Mexico, Venezuela, Bolivia, Chile, Argentina and Colombia)
- ASINSA, with half of the students coming from Asian countries (mainly China, Vietnam, and Malaysia)
- GLOBALINSA (ex SCAN), with students coming from all over the world, and in which courses are taught in English.
- SHN, a section for high level athletes
- 5 art sections (Music, Plastic Arts, Theater, Dance and Cinema)

For the past ten years, INSA Lyon has been consistently the most desired Engineering school by French high school students who express their wishes through a national portal

== Second cycle (Masters of Engineering) ==
The second cycle lasts three years and trains students in nine departments of engineering:

- Biosciences
  - Biochemistry & Biotechnologies
  - Bioinformatics and Modelling
- Civil Engineering & Urban planning
- Computer science
- Electrical engineering
- Energy and environmental engineering
- Industrial engineering
- Mechanical Engineering
- Materials science and Engineering
- Telecommunications engineering

== International ==
INSA Lyon has a policy of encouraging international education.

- Students are required to spend at least six months of their curriculum abroad, either during an internship or as an exchange student. INSA Lyon has over 200 partner universities around the world, 36 double degrees and seven international laboratories.
- There are nine different languages taught at INSA Lyon, and students must study at least two foreign languages when part of international sections, and at least one when part of the classical section.
- There are 30% of foreign students at INSA Lyon, with over 90 nationalities represented.
- INSA Lyon's Preparatory Level offers four international sections (EURINSA, ASINSA, AMERINSA, and GLOBALINSA (ex SCAN)) with extra language and culture classes.

== Research ==
INSA Lyon is blessed with the largest research funding among Grandes Écoles in France. It features 23 laboratories.

In 2016, INSA Lyon had 613 PhD students and supported 155 theses.

The school also offers 10 Masters of Science for students interested in research careers.

== Student life ==
Since its creation, INSA Lyon has offered its students the possibility to live on-campus and provide various facilities including various clubs, library, restaurants...

=== Yearly events ===
- February : Le Gala. After the graduation ceremony, a dinner and a celebration party are organized at the Palais des congrès de Lyon.
- Shrove Tuesday : Le Karnaval, a student-run carnival
- April : Le Bal, a prestigious party open to all students
- May : Les 24 heures de l'INSA, France's largest student festival

=== Student associations ===
Over a hundred associations have been registered so far, such as:

- Le Bureau des Élèves (BDE): INSA Lyon's student office
- Alumni INSA Lyon: INSA Lyon's alumni association
- Forum Rhône-Alpes: France's largest engineering job fair
- Etic INSA Technologies: 2016 and 2019 France's best junior enterprise
- La K-Fêt (ARGIL): student pub
- L'insatiable: student newspaper
- Le Karnaval: Shrove Tuesday carnival association
- Objectif 21: sustainable development association
- Exit: LGBT association
- BEST Lyon: European association
- CLES FACIL: rocket club
- Clubelek: mechatronics club
- Ciné Club movie club
- La Mouette: video club
- Graines d'Images: photography club
- Club BD Manga: comics club
- CLUJI: board games club
- Insa Talks: club organizing the yearly TEDxINSA event
- Club d'œnologie de l'INSA Lyon: Wine club

Most of the departments also have a student association (Adege for electrical engineering students, AEDI for computer science students).

== Rankings ==
World University Rankings
Ranking Organisation	Year	Position	Total Institutions Ranked	Percentage in Top
THE World University Ranking	2025	601	2,800	Top 21%
QS World University Ranking	2025	405	1,500	Top 27%

World Ranking by Subject
Ranking Organisation	Year	Subject Area	Position	Percentage in Top
Shanghai Ranking by Subject	2024	Mechanics	25	Top 6%
Shanghai Ranking by Subject	2023	Mathematics	51	Top 10%
QS Ranking by Subject	2025	Electrical and Electronic Engineering	151	Top 27%
QS Ranking by Subject	2024	Materials Sciences	101	Top 24%

French national rankings
Ranking Organisation	Year	Position	Total Institutions ranked	Percentage in Top
L'Usine Nouvelle	2025	10	127	Top 8%
L'Étudiant	2025	14	170	Top 8%
Le Figaro étudiant (post-bac)	2025	1	92	Top 1%

== Sports ==
The LyonTech campus offers many sports facilities that are also available to INSA students. INSA was awarded the title of the best sports university in France. The "Centre des Sports" (sports centre) is run by 18 specialised sports teachers and has four objectives: to supervise sports practices, to run the “Association Sportive” (Sports Association), to supervise students in the top athletes sports section, and to coordinate technological research applied to sports equipment. This association brings together students who wish to specialise in the practice of a particular sport. It runs on the basis of one or more training session per week and participates in the French University Championships Approximately one third of INSA students are licensed with the Sports Association. The Association's achievements are excellent, with many French Championship titles being won every year. INSA Lyon students are frequently selected to represent the French National University team at the various University World Championships and in the “Universiades”, participating in many of the Olympic Sports.

Top athletes

Since 1981, INSA has been entrusted by the Ministries of National Education and Sports with the administration of a sports section called SHN (Sportifs de Haut Niveau, literally High Level Sportsmen). 11 students from this section have participated in the Olympic Games. Two World Champions have graduated from INSA. François Gabart is a French professional offshore yacht racer who won the seventh Vendée Globe race in 2013 and established a new record.

== See also ==
- Institut National des Sciences Appliquées
