= INSA Strasbourg =

Strasbourg National Institute for Applied Sciences Institut national des sciences appliquées de Strasbourg
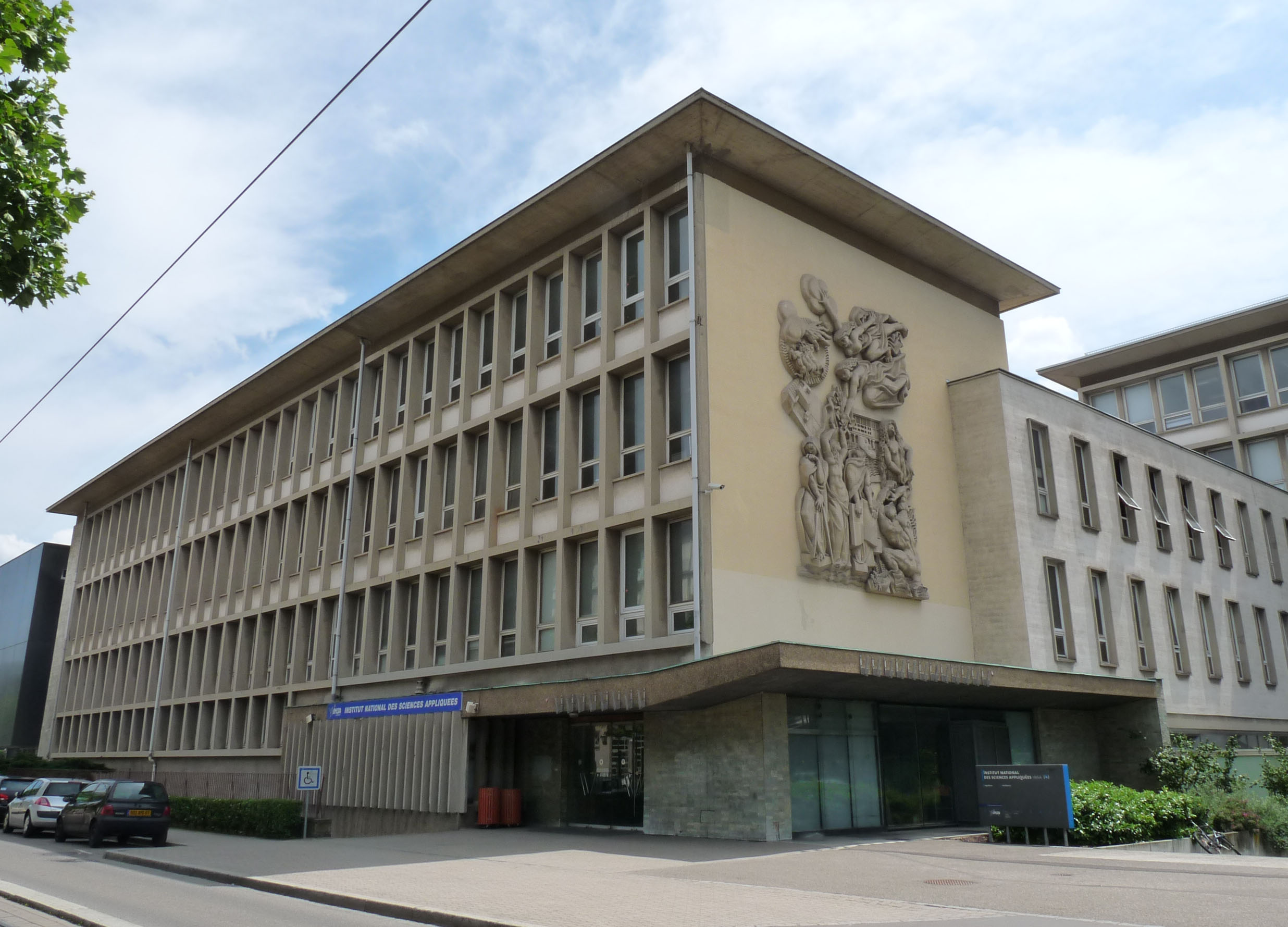
- The front view of INSA (National Institute of Applied Sciences) in Strasbourg

Location
- Strasbourg; France
- Coordinates: 48.5819°N 7.7650°E

Information
- Established: 3 May 2003
- Website: www.insa-strasbourg.fr

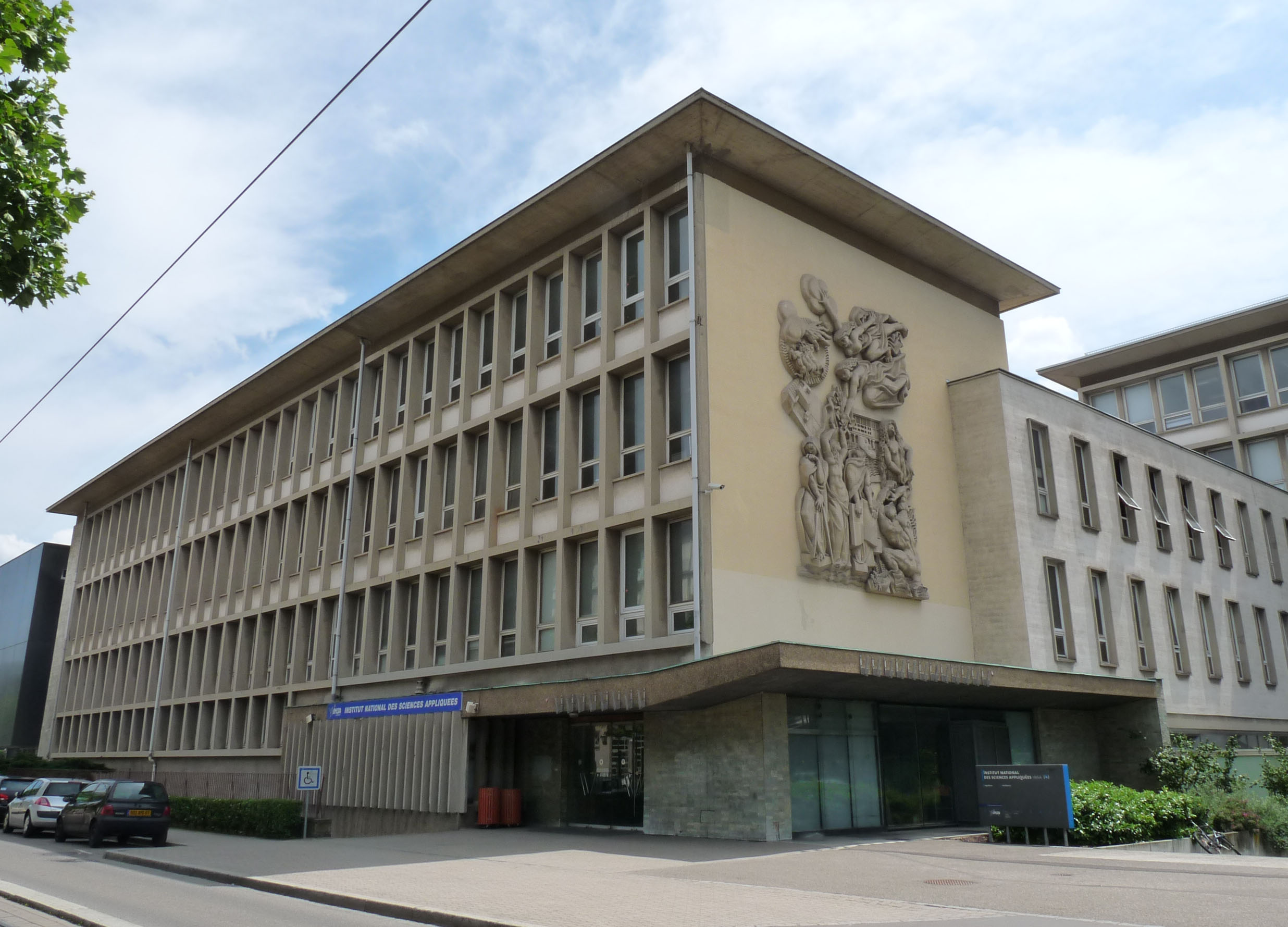
The front view of INSA (National Institute of Applied Sciences) in Strasbourg

The Institut National des Sciences Appliquées de Strasbourg (French pronunciation: [ɛ̃stity nɑsjɔnal de sjɑ̃s(z‿)aplike də stʁasbuʁ]; "Strasbourg National Institute for Applied Sciences") or INSA Strasbourg is a Grande École d'Ingénieurs with selective admission criteria. INSA Strasbourg is one of the 210 French Engineering School entitled to deliver the "Diplôme d’ingénieur". It is currently under the authority of the French Ministry of Education and Research and part of INSA's network, the leading French group of engineering institutes.

The school was founded in 1875, under the name of Technische Winterschule für Wiesenbautechniker. In 2003, the school joins the INSA's group regrouping six French engineering schools and takes its current name. The five-year curriculum aims at training engineers and/or architects who possess humane qualities and are well versed in the primary areas of science, engineering and/or architecture. The school accommodates 1,700 students in engineering and architecture. Graduates from INSA de Strasbourg are called "Insassiens".

INSA Strasbourg trains architects and engineers in 7 specialities (mechanical engineering, plasturgy, mechatronics, civil engineering, surveying engineering, HVAC and energy engineering, electrical engineering), 2 "sandwichcourse" specialities and 4 research units. Most significantly, it awards the only architect degree course within an engineering school in France. INSA Strasbourg has been working hand-in-hand with industry for over a hundred years and hosts large business forums with more than 100 companies.

In 2009, INSA Strasbourg was ranked 7th out of 67 French engineering schools offering a 5-year curriculum (L'Etudiant magazine) and is to date the only engineering school in France that also provides a curriculum for architects.

== Major fields of study ==
• Architecture (architect degree)

• Engineering degrees - Civil Engineering - Surveying Engineering - Mechanical Engineering - Plastics Engineering - Mecatronics - Electrical Engineering - HVAC and Energy Engineering

• Master's degrees - Urban Planning and Development, speciality Architecture, Structures and Urban Projects - Materials, speciality Surface Engineering - Information Systems, speciality Geomatics

• Specialised master degrees - Eco-consultant

== International Partnership ==
The international dimension and the integration of education, research and innovation permeate the entire curriculum as well as the extra-curricular activities. All students have to undergo at least three months of international exchange as part of their curriculum, either for their studies, for research or an internship. There are five double degree programs available which are conducted with institutes from Germany, Spain, the United States and Brazil. INSA Strasbourg also offers partnerships leading to foreign master's degrees (with Sweden, United-States, Germany, Australia, United Kingdom, Switzerland,...).

== French-German bilingual curriculum ==
In 2008 the French-German bilingual curriculum DEUTSCHINSA was created in cooperation with 5 German and Swiss universities in order to enable post-baccalaureate French and German students to attend bilingual courses during three semesters from their first year at INSA and prior to specializing in Engineering studies or Architecture. In addition, students can avail themselves of the opportunity to obtain Franco-German double degrees in Topgraphy (Karlsruhe), Civil Engineering (Dresden), Environmental Engineering and Mechanical Engineering (Offenburg).

== Extra-curricular activities ==
Students at INSA Strasbourg have a large choice of extra-curricular activities: the Eco-Shell marathon, the French robotics cup, the Edhec race, the sailing tour of France, the 4L Trophy, Architects without Borders, Engineers without Borders, the sports association, clubs and bands, a gala evening, a freshers’ weekend, Meet’INSA (meeting of the 6 INSAs), theatre, photography, etc
