= List of universities and higher education institutions in the Paris region =

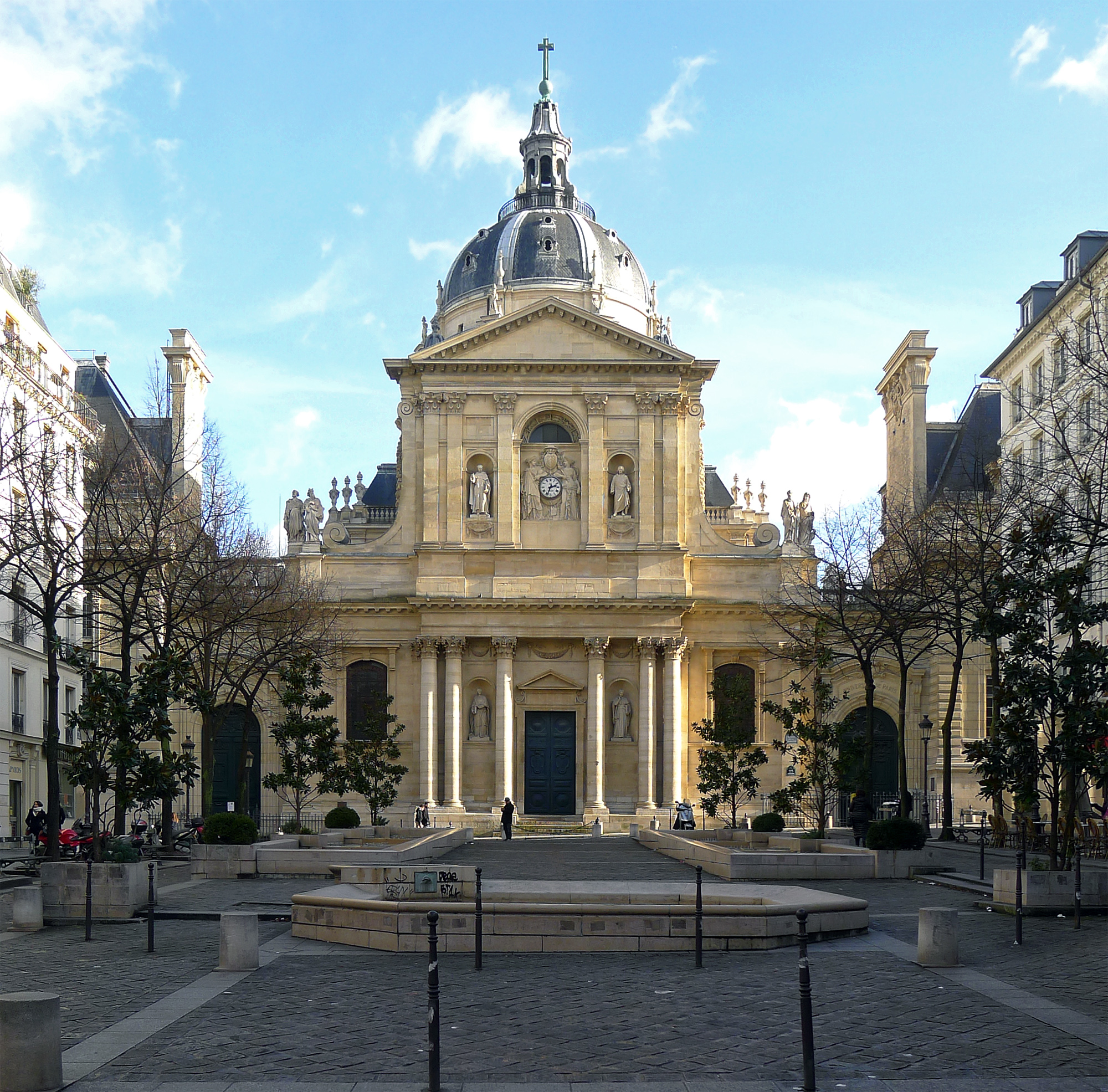
The Sorbonne building, part of Sorbonne University and Paris-1 Panthéon-Sorbonne University.

Paris and its region have one of the highest concentrations of universities in France, with a student population of over 730,000 (not counting foreign universities with Paris branches). Paris has 15 universities and is home to a large number of Grandes Écoles (which may be similar to a higher education college), a specialized top level educational institution.

Some of these Grandes Écoles, which are often over a hundred years old, have been grouped together within new major universities, such as PSL University and the Polytechnic Institute of Paris. The Saclay University, for its part, has integrated a number of Grandes Écoles. For example, the highly specialised Dauphine University, along with a dozen other Grandes Écoles, forms the collegiate PSL University.

== Universities ==
Key (lower numbers are better):

- QS FR: national rank in QS World University Rankings 2023
- ARWU FR: national rank in Academic Ranking of World Universities 2023
- OS LW: L'Obs "Law" ranking of the most reputable universities in 2020
- OS EC: L'Obs "Economics" ranking of the most reputable universities in 2020
- ARWU: ranking in Academic Ranking of World Universities 2023

Short name	Name	Students	QS FR	ARWU FR	OS LW	OS EC	ARWU	THE	Subjects	Academy
Paris Cité	Paris Cité University	63,000	7	4	5	1	78	114	Multidisciplinary	Paris
Sorbonne	Sorbonne University	56,821	3	3	—	—	43	90	Multidisciplinary (except Law and Economics)	Paris
Saclay	Paris-Saclay University	48,000	4	1	3	14	16	93	Science, Engineering, Medicine, Law, Economics	Versailles
Paris-1	University of Paris 1 Panthéon-Sorbonne	45,200	9	—	1	4	—	—	Arts and Humanities, Social sciences, Economics, Law	Paris
Créteil	Paris-East Créteil University	32,156	—	—	—	—	—	—	Medicine, Science	Créteil
Paris-10	Paris Nanterre University	32,000	32	—	7	11	—	—	Social sciences, Law	Versailles
Cergy	CY Cergy Paris University	26,477	19	—	—	—	—	—	Science, Social sciences, Humanities	Versailles
Paris-13	Sorbonne Paris North University	25,000	—	—	—	16	—	—	Science, Social sciences, Medicine	Créteil
Assas	Panthéon-Assas University Paris	23,000	17	—	2	2	—	—	Law, Economics, Political science, Media studies	Paris
Sorbonne Nouvelle	University of Sorbonne Nouvelle Paris 3	19,360	—	—	—	—	—	—	Arts and Humanities	Paris
Paris-8, or Saint-Denis	Paris 8 University Vincennes-Saint-Denis	22,023	—	—	—	—	—	—	Social sciences, Arts and Humanities	Créteil
Versailles	University of Versailles	19,000	—	20-22	—	—	601-700	—	Science, Medicine, Law, Social sciences	Versailles
PSL, or Dauphine	PSL University	17,000	1	2	—	—	40	47	Multidisciplinary	Paris
Gustave-Eiffel	Gustave-Eiffel University	17,000	—	—	—	9	—	—	Science, Engineering	Créteil
Polytechnique	Polytechnic Institute of Paris	8,500	2	13-16	—	—	301-400	95	Science, Engineering	Versailles
Évry	University of Évry	6,458	—	—	—	—	—	—	Multidisciplinary	Versailles

== Major Grandes Écoles ==
In France, the CGE has been labelling and listing the Grandes Écoles since 1973, and now has 238 major institutions specialising in: engineering, management, architecture, political science, creation & design, journalism, military schools, veterinary and health schools, etc.

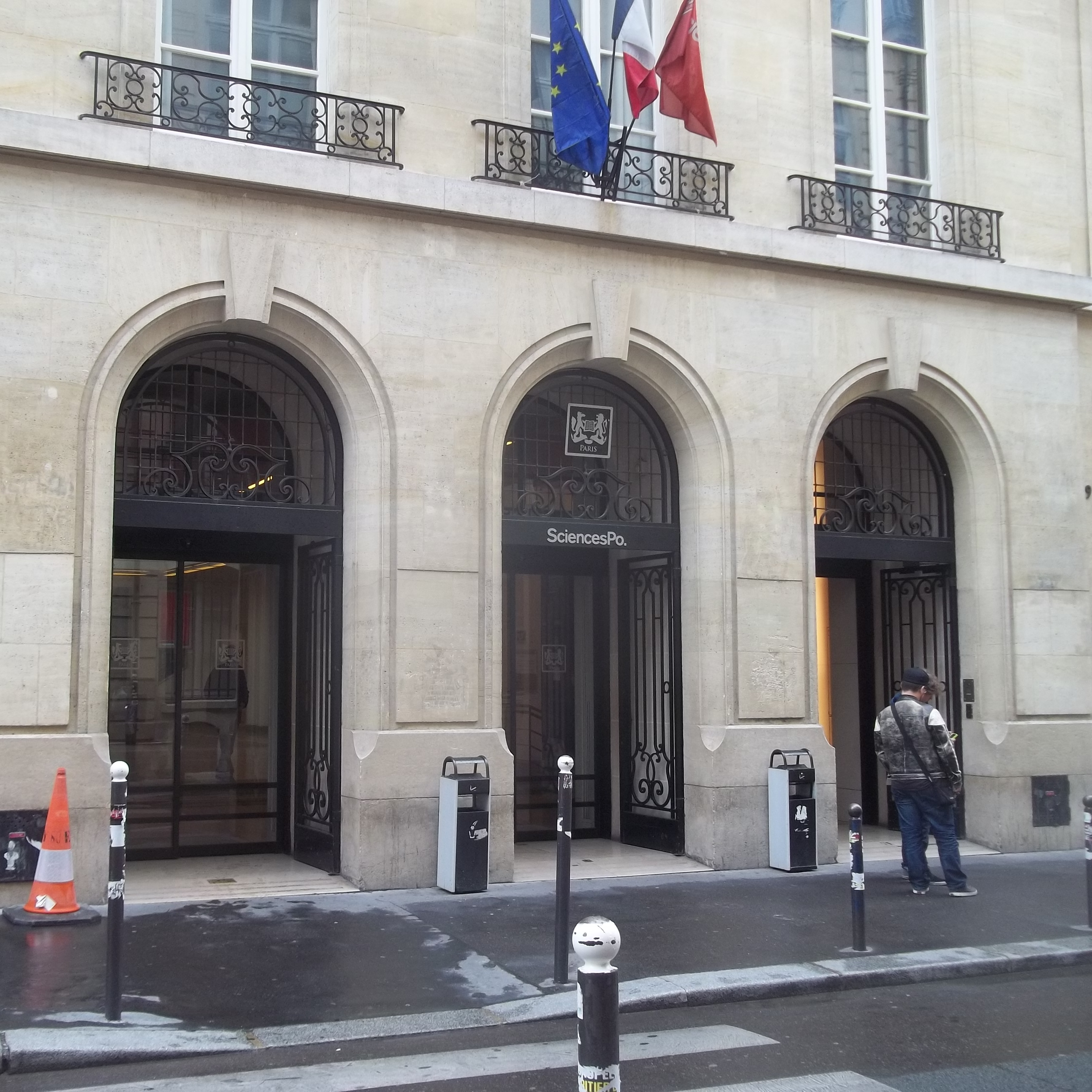
The entrance to the Grande École Sciences Po, rue St-Guillaume, Paris.

Key (lower numbers are better):

- FG ENG: Le Figaro ranking of post-prepa engineering schools 2023
- FT EBS: Financial Times European Business Schools Ranking 2022
- FT MBS: Financial Times Business school rankings - MBA 2023
- QS: ranking in QS World University Rankings 2023
- QS POL: "Politics" in QS World University Rankings 2023
- ARWU: ranking in Academic Ranking of World Universities 2023

Short name	Name	Students	Type	FT EBS	FT MBA	FG ENG	QS POL	QS	ARWU	Subjects	Academy
Sciences Po	Institut d'études politiques de Paris	15,000	Public-Private	—	—	—	3	259	—	Multidisciplinary	Paris
ESCP	École supérieure de commerce de Paris, Sorbonne Alliance	15,000	Private, on public funds	3	27	—	—	—	—	Economics	Paris
HEC	École des hautes études commerciales de Paris	13,500	Private, on public funds	1	17	—	—	—	—	Economics	Versailles
Emlyon	Emlyon Business School	9,000	Private	10	—	—	—	—	—	Economics	Lyon
Arts et Métiers	École nationale supérieure d'arts et métiers de Paris	6,200	Public	—	—	14	—	—	—	Engineering	Paris
ESSEC	École supérieure des sciences économiques et commerciales, CY Cergy Paris University	5,000	Private	9	70	—	—	—	—	Economics	Versailles
INSP, or ENA	Institut national du service public, PSL University	5,000	Public	—	—	—	—	—	—	Administration	Paris
Centrale Paris	CentraleSupélec, Paris-Saclay University	4,300	Public	—	—	2	—	69 (Saclay)	16 (Saclay)	Engineering	Versailles
X	École Polytechnique, Polytechnic Institute of Paris	3,370	Public	—	—	1	—	48 (IP)	301-400 (IP)	Engineering	Versailles
EHESS	École des hautes études en sciences sociales	3,000	Public	—	—	—	—	—	701-800	Social sciences	Paris
ENS-PSL	École normale supérieure, PSL University	2,500	Public	—	—	—	—	26 (PSL)	40 (PSL)	Science and Human science	Paris
AgroParisTech	AgroParisTech, Paris-Saclay University	2,500	Public	—	—	11	—	69 (Saclay)	16 (Saclay)	Engineering	Versailles
ENS Lyon	École normale supérieure de Lyon, Lyon University Group	2,500	Public	—	—	—	—	187	201-300	Science and Human science	Lyon
ENPC	École nationale des ponts et chaussées, Polytechnic Institute of Paris	2,000	Public	—	—	4	—	174	—	Engineering	Créteil
Télécom Paris	École nationale supérieure des télécommunications, Polytechnic Institute of Paris	1,700	Public	—	—	5	—	48 (IP)	301-400 (IP)	Engineering	Versailles
ENS Paris-Saclay	École normale supérieure, Paris-Saclay University	1,500	Public	—	—	—	—	69 (Saclay)	16 (Saclay)	Science and Human science	Versailles
ENSA Paris	École nationale supérieure d'architecture de Paris-Val de Seine, Paris-Cité University	1,116	Public	—	—	—	—	—	—	Architecture	Paris
CELSA	École des hautes études en sciences de l'information et de la communication - CELSA, Sorbonne University	1,000	Public	—	—	—	—	43 (SU)	90 (SU)	Communication and journalism	Paris
INSEAD	Institut européen d'administration des affaires, Sorbonne Alliance	1,000	Private	15	2	—	—	—	—	Economics	Versailles
Mines-PSL	École nationale supérieure des mines, PSL University	1,000	Public	—	—	3	—	26 (PSL)	40 (PSL)	Engineering	Paris
IFM	Institut français de la mode	1,000	Private	—	—	—	—	—	—	Fashion, luxury goods and design	Paris
Sciences Po Saint-Germain	Institut d'études politiques de Saint-Germain-en-Laye, University of Versailles	900	Public	—	—	—	—	—	601-700 (UVSQ)	Multidisciplinary	Versailles
Arts Déco	École nationale supérieure des arts décoratifs de Paris, PSL University	700	Public	—	—	—	—	26 (PSL)	40 (PSL)	Art and design	Paris
SupOptique	Institut d'optique Graduate School, Paris-Saclay University	600	Private	—	—	11	—	69 (Saclay)	16 (Saclay)	Engineering	Versailles
ENSAE Paris	École nationale de la statistique et de l'administration économique, Polytechnic Institute of Paris	580	Public	—	—	6	—	—	—	Engineering	Versailles
ENM	École nationale de la magistrature	500	Public	—	—	—	—	—	—	Law	Bordeaux
CFJ	Centre de formation des journalistes, Assas University	400	Private	—	—	—	—	—	—	Journalism	Paris
Chimie Paris-PSL	École nationale supérieure de chimie de Paris, PSL University	300	Public	—	—	8	—	26 (PSL)	40 (PSL)	Engineering	Paris
La Fémis	École nationale supérieure des métiers de l'image et du son, PSL University	200	Public	—	—	—	—	—	—	Art	Paris
Saint-Cyr	École spéciale militaire de Saint-Cyr	170	Public	—	—	—	—	—	—	Military	Coëtquidan
ENC	École nationale des chartes, PSL University	100	Public	—	—	—	—	26 (PSL)	40 (PSL)	Historical science	Paris

== History ==
=== Since the dissolution of the University of Paris (1970) ===
The universités in Paris are the direct or indirect successors of the University of Paris, divided in 1970.

Number	Previous name	Current name	Faculties/institutes before breakup	Current subjects	Students	Academy
Paris I	University of Paris 1 Panthéon-Sorbonne		Faculty of Law and Economics (35 out of 41 of the economics Professors joined, along with a few professors from law) and the Faculty of Humanities. There were also Paris Institute of Geography, Paris Institute of Business Administration, part of Institute of Art and Archeology of the University of Paris	Humanities, Law, Social sciences, Economics	45,200	Paris
Paris II	Paris II Panthéon-Assas	Paris-Panthéon-Assas University	Faculty of Law and Economics of Paris (88 out of 108 of the law professors joined, along with a few professors from Economics), and Graduate Institute of International Studies	Law, Political Science, Economics	17,705	Paris
Paris III	New Sorbonne University		Faculty of Humanities accompanined by Institute of Linguistics of Paris, Institute for Advanced Latin American Studies of the University of Paris	Humanities	19,360	Paris
Paris IV	Paris-Sorbonne University	Sorbonne University	Faculty of Humanities, along with Institute of Slavic Studies of the University of Paris, and Institute of Musicology of the University of Paris	Humanities	55,600	Paris
Paris VI	Pierre-and-Marie-Curie University	Sorbonne University	Faculty of Science, Faculty of Medicine, National School of Chemistry, and Paris Institute of Earth Physics (until 1990)	Science, Medicine	55,600	Paris
Paris V	Paris Descartes University	Paris Cité University	Faculty of Humanities, Faculty of Medicine, Faculty of Pharmacy, Paris Institute of Psychology, Paris Institute of Pharmacotechnics and Pharmacodynamics, Avenue de Versailles University Institute of Technology, and Paris Institute of Molecular Pathology.	Medicine, Social sciences, Humanities	64,100	Paris
Paris VII	Paris Diderot University	Paris Cité University	Faculty of Sciences, Faculty of Letters, and Faculty of Medicine	Science, Medicine, Humanities, Social sciences, Arts	64,100	Paris
Paris VIII	University of Vincennes	Paris 8 University Vincennes-Saint-Denis	Vincennes University Center (Most professors were from Faculty of Humanities)	Social sciences	14,070	Créteil
Paris IX	Paris-IX University	Paris Dauphine University - PSL (grande école of PSL University)	Dauphine University Center (The professors were from the Department of Economics of the Faculty of Law and Economics)	Mathematics, Computer Science, Management, Economics, Finance, Law, Political Science, Journalism	10,000	Créteil
Paris X	Université Paris Ouest	Paris Nanterre University	Faculty of Law and Economics and Faculty of Humanities in Nanterre, along with Ville-d'Avray University Institute of Technology	Law, humanities, political science, social and natural sciences and economics.	32,000	Versailles
Paris XI	Université Paris-Sud	Paris-Saclay University	Faculty of Science in Orsay (Fourth Faculty of Sciences), Institut Gustave Roussy, Institute of Nuclear Physics of the University of Paris, Orsay University Institute of Technology, Cachan University Institute of Technology, and Sceaux University Institute of Technology	Medicine, Science, Law, Economics	60,000	Versailles
Paris XII	Université Paris-Est	Paris-East Créteil University	University Hospital Center (In French: Centre hospitalier universitaire, CHU) Henri-Mondor, Faculty of Law and Economics in Créteil, Varenne-Saint-Hilaire University Center, and Planning Institute of Paris	Medicine, Science	32,156	Créteil
Paris XIII	Université Paris Nord	Sorbonne Paris North University	Faculty of Sciences of Paris in Villetaneuse (Third Faculty of Sciences), Faculty of Law and Economics, Saint-Denis University Center - Villetaneuse, and Saint-Denis University Institutes of Technology	Science, Social sciences, Medicine, Law	23,078	Créteil

== Collegiate universities, alliances and other institutions ==
=== Collegiate universities in Paris ===
There are five collegiate universities (Établissement public à caractère scientifique, culturel et professionnel expérimental, or EPSCPE) in the Paris region:

University	Colleges, schools and Grandes écoles	Associate schools and universities
PSL University	Paris Dauphine University; Collège de France; École nationale supérieure des arts décoratifs; Chimie ParisTech; École normale supérieure; Conservatoire national supérieur d'art dramatique; ESPCI ParisTech; École des hautes études en sciences sociales; École Nationale des Chartes; École pratique des hautes études; Conservatoire national supérieur de musique et de danse de Paris; Observatoire de Paris; MINES ParisTech	École nationale supérieure des beaux-arts; La Fémis
Assas University	Institut Supérieur d'Interprétation et Traduction; École Française d'Électronique et d'Informatique; Centre de Formation des Journalistes; W School of Journalism and Communication; Institut de Préparation à l'Administration Générale de Paris; Institut d'Études Judiciaires Pierre-Raynaud; French Press Institute	Institut de Recherche Stratégique de l'École Militaire; Institut National de l'Audiovisuel
Paris-Saclay University	AgroParisTech; CentraleSupélec; École normale supérieure Paris-Saclay; Institut d'optique Graduate School; Paris-Saclay Faculty of Sciences; Paris-Saclay Medical School; Polytech Paris-Saclay	HEC Paris; University of Versailles; Sciences Po Saint-Germain-en-Laye; IAE of Versailles; Institut des Sciences et Techniques des Yvelines; University Institute of Technology of Vélizy; University of Évry-Val d'Essonne
Polytechnic Institute of Paris	École Polytechnique; ENSAE ParisTech; ENSTA ParisTech; Telecom Paris; Telecom SudParis; École nationale des ponts et chaussées	HEC Paris
Paris Cité University	Institut national des langues et civilisations orientales; Institut de Physique du Globe de Paris	

=== Alliances of universities and higher education institutions in Paris ===
There are five groups of universities and higher education institutions in the Paris region - three of them are COMUEs and two of them are alliances:

Grouping	Universities	Grandes écoles (Colleges and graduate schools)
Sorbonne University Alliance	Sorbonne University; Paris II Panthéon-Assas University	University of Technology of Compiègne
Sorbonne Paris Cité Alliance	Paris Cité University; Sorbonne Paris Nord University	Sciences Po Paris; Institut national des langues et civilisations orientales; École des Hautes Études en Santé Publique; Institut de Physique du Globe de Paris
Université Paris Lumières	Paris X Nanterre; Paris 8 Vincennes Saint-Denis	
Paris-Est Sup	Gustave Eiffel University; Université Paris-Est Créteil Val de Marne	École nationale vétérinaire d'Alfort; École nationale des ponts et chaussées; École supérieure d'ingénieurs en électronique et électrotechnique
HESAM University		École nationale supérieure des arts et métiers (Arts et Métiers); Conservatoire national des arts et métiers (CNAM); Centre des études supérieures industrielles (CESI); École Boulle; École Duperré; École Estienne; École nationale supérieure des arts appliqués et des métiers d'art (ENSAAMA); École nationale supérieure d'architecture de Paris-La Villette (ENSAPLV); École nationale supérieure de création industrielle (ENSCI - Les Ateliers); Institut Français de la Mode (IFM); Paris School of Business (PSB); Centre de formation des journalistes de Paris (CFJ)

Some groups have been terminated, such as Paris Universitas, Paris Centre Universités or UniverSud Paris, and some other are still in discussion.

=== Private universities in Paris ===
- Catholic University of Paris
- Catholic University of Lille in Issy-lès-Moulineaux
- Paris University of International Education

=== Foreign universities in Paris ===
- American University of Paris
- University of London Institute in Paris
