= Southern Brittany University =

French public university

Coordinates: 47.6463°N 2.7442°W

- Université Bretagne Sud
- Type: Public
- Established: 1995
- Affiliations: European University of Brittany (formerly)
- Endowment: €103,000,000 (2024)
- President: David Menier
- Faculty: 647 (2024)
- Administrative staff: 535 (2024)
- Students: 10,426 (2024)
- Location: Morbihan, France
- Campus: Lorient, Vannes, Pontivy
- Website: www.univ-ubs.fr

Southern Brittany University (French: Université Bretagne Sud) is a French public university, in the Academy of Rennes. The university is separated in three different campuses: Lorient, Vannes and Pontivy.

== Academics ==
=== Formation ===
All faculties and institutes award 100 degrees recognised by the Ministry of Higher Education, and prepares for several competitive exams.

==== Bachelors and two-years degrees ====
The university is offering preparation for university entrance qualification, allowing people without baccalauréat to gain admission to university.

Fourteen specialisations of diplôme universitaire in law studies, science and technology, and humanities.

The university also offers preparations for competitive exams like CRPE or CAPES in partnership with the University of Western Brittany

Two two-year higher school preparatory classes are existing on both Lorient and Vannes in partnership with local lycées.

The Licentiate degree is issued in several fields, which are then subdivided into mentions and specialisations. The following are offered at UBS:

- Humanities with 4 mentions
- Social science with 3 mentions
- Law and economics with 3 mentions
- Science, technology and health with 10 mentions.

In addition, the university and its two university technical institute offers 15 professional licenciate and 10 Bachelor of technical and applied studies specialities.

==== Master's degrees ====
In the same way, master's degree is issued in several academic areas:

- Humanities with 4 mentions
- Social science with 6 mentions
- Law and economics with 5 mentions
- Science, technology and health with 8 mentions.

The university is authorised to award graduate engineer degrees within its engineering school, the École nationale supérieure d'ingénieurs de Bretagne Sud in 4 specialisations.

== Notable people ==
Faculty

- Olga Novo (born 1975, in Vilarmao, A Pobra do Brollón) - Galician poet and essayist

Alumni

- Gwendal Rouillard (born 1976) - politician (LREM)

Recipient of honorary degree

- Sabu Thomas (born 1962) - Indian professor; vice-chancellor of Mahatma Gandhi University, Kerala

== See also ==
- List of public universities in France by academy
