= Daeu =

Daeu may refer to:

- Daewoo, a major South Korean chaebol;
- Diplôme d'accès aux études universitaires, a French degree.
