= Darmon =

Darmon is a surname. Notable people with the surname include:

- Gérard Darmon (born 1948), French-Moroccan actor and singer
- Henri Darmon (born 1965), French Canadian mathematician
- Jean-Charles Darmon (born 1961), French literary critic
- Pierre Darmon (born 1934), French tennis player, husband of Rosa
- Ron Darmon (born 1992), Israeli triathlete
- Rosa Maria Reyes Darmon (born 1939), French tennis player, wife of Pierre
