= Gérard Férey =

French chemist

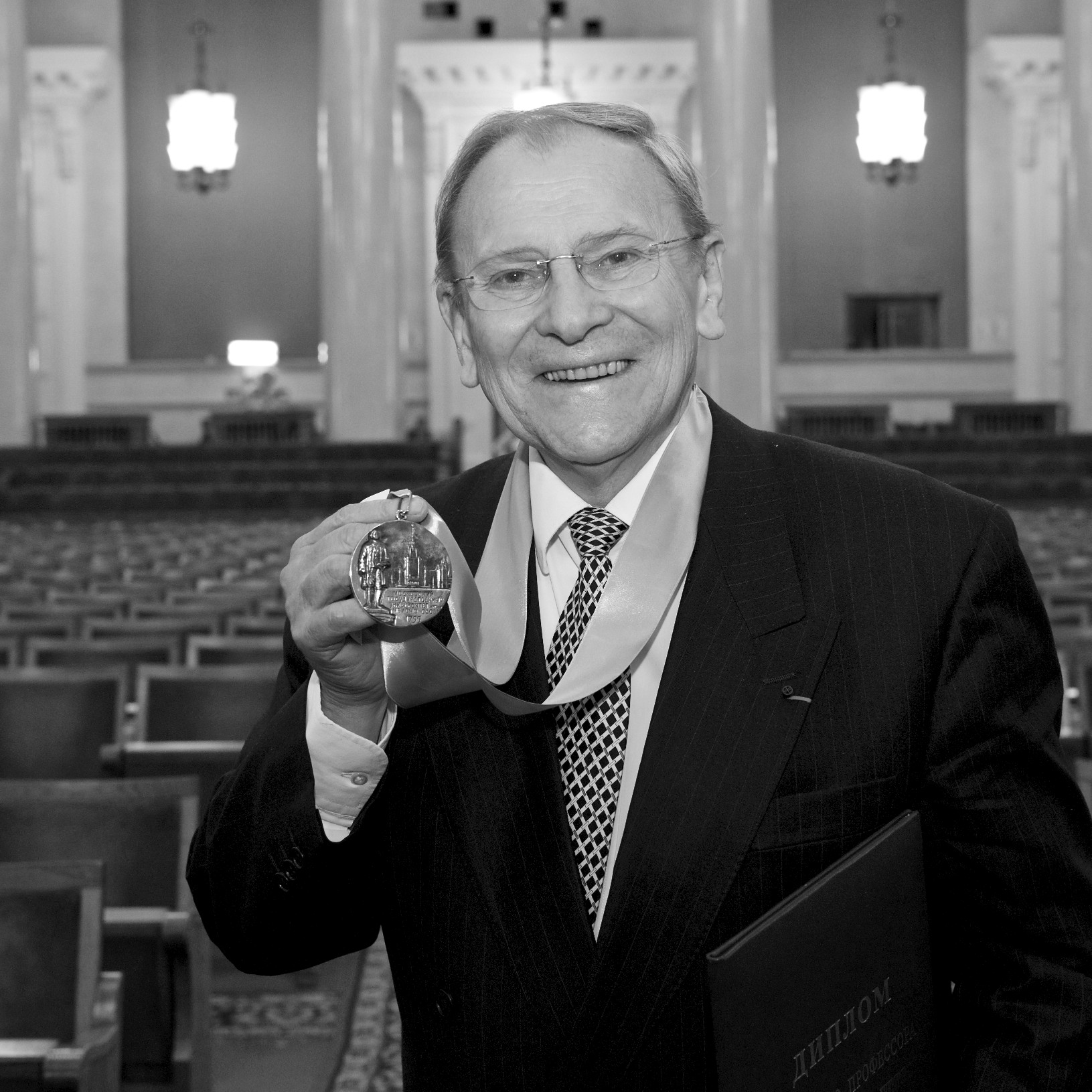
- Gérard Férey in 2014
- Born: 14 July 1941; Bréhal, France
- Died: 19 August 2017 (aged 76); 15th arrondissement of Paris, France
- Education: University of Caen Normandy; Pierre and Marie Curie University (PhD)
- Awards: CNRS Gold medal (2010)
- Scientific career
- Fields: Chemistry
- Workplaces: University of Versailles Saint-Quentin-en-Yvelines

Gérard Férey (14 July 1941 – 19 August 2017) was a French chemist who was a member of the French Academy of Sciences and a professor at the University of Versailles Saint-Quentin-en-Yvelines. He specialized in the physical chemistry of solids and materials. He focused on the crystal chemistry of inorganic fluorides and on porous solids.

In September 2010, he received the CNRS Gold medal, the highest French scientific distinction.

== History ==
Gerard Férey was a lecturer at the University of Maine. In 1968, he founded the Department of Chemistry at the University Institutes of Technology of Le Mans. He argued his doctoral thesis at the Pierre-and-Marie-Curie University in 1977.

He was a teacher at the University of Maine from 1981 to 1996 and then at the Versailles Saint-Quentin-en-Yvelines University since that date, where he founded the Lavoisier Institute. From 1988 to 1992 he was deputy director of the Department of Chemistry at the French National Centre for Scientific Research.

He was elected to the French Academy of Sciences 18 November 2003. In 2007, he was vice-president of the Société Chimique de France. He was a member of the Institut Universitaire de France. He was also at the initiative of the Chemistry Ambition, a group that includes seven players in chemistry of France aimed at enhancing the image of the discipline to the public.

== Bibliography ==
Gerard Férey published 605 articles in international journals, including the Journal of Solid State Chemistry, the Solid State Sciences, the Chemistry of Materials, Angewandte Chemie International Edition, the Journal of the American Chemical Society, four book chapters and one book (Crystal Chemistry, World Scientific Publishing, 2016). He gave more than 100 plenary lectures in international symposia, and deposited 14 international patents.

== Awards ==
- Prix de chimie du solide de la Société chimique de France (Solid State Chemistry award of the Chemical Society of France) (1983)
- Prix Paul Pascal de l’Académie des sciences (Paul Pascal award of the French Academy of Sciences) (1992)
- Prix de l’Institut français du pétrole de l’Académie des sciences (French Institute of Petroleum award of the French Academy of Sciences) (2000)
- Prix Gay-Lussac-Humboldt de la Fondation Alexander von Humboldt (Gay-Lussac-Humboldt award of the Alexander von Humboldt foundation) (2004)
- Prix C.N.R. RAO de l’Académie nationale des sciences de l’Inde ( C.N.R. RAO award of the Indian Academy of Sciences) (2005)
- Grand prix de la Société chimique du Japon (Japan chemical society award) (2008)
- Prix Catalan-Sabatier de la Société royale de chimie espagnole (Catalan-Sabatier award of the Spanish Royal Society of Chemistry) (2008)
- Prix ENI (ENI award) (2009) - for his work on the massive sequestration of CO2 and the explanation of this phenomenon. It develops the Mil-101, a solid which can store CO2.
- CNRS Gold medal (2010)
- Knight of the Legion of Honour
- Officer of the Ordre des Palmes Académiques
- Officer of the National Order of Merit
