= Modernization plans of French universities =

During the 1990s and the 2000s, the French governments have launched the modernization plans of French universities (in French, plans de modernisation des universités françaises).

Investments of the state had been important, especially for the development of new academic centers before and after May 1968. However, these two modernization plans have been more publicized.

== 2000 University ==
This plan was adopted by the Council of Ministers on 23 May 1990. With initial funding of 32 billion of French francs over five years (1991-1995), it would increase the number of premises, while the number of students was increasing. In 1994, operations were paid via the Contrat de projets État-région (Project contract state-region). The final funding was 40 billion francs (U2000 plan: 16.6; U2000 reported in CPER: 15.7, new operation in CPER: 8).

This scheme has helped to build 3.5 million square meters of new buildings for higher education and research, including:

- Eight new universities,
- 196 departments of UIT and 24 full UIT,
- 7 European centers (become PRES).

== University of the 3rd millennium ==
U3M plan, which combines state and local authorities, is a large-scale plan of the order of 50 billion of French francs. It is part of an overall approach, the schema utility of higher education and research. Like its predecessor, this plan has been largely funded through the CPER 2000-2006 (42 billion francs). It was more than build new premises but to rehabilitate the existing. A special effort was made to student life, 25% of the funding went to libraries, restaurants and dormitories.

== Campus Plan ==
The Campus Plan (in French, Plan campus), differs from the other two by at least two points:

- it concerns a limited number of campus;
- it is done with public-private partnerships.

== Large loan ==
Of the 35 billion euros of large loan, 22 are for higher education and research. In particular:

- Excellence initiatives (initiatives d'excellence) : 7.7 billion
- Campus plan (Plan campus) receives 1.3 billion
- Equipment of Excellence (équipements d’excellence) receive 1 billion
- Laboratories of excellence (laboratoires d’excellence), 1 billion.
- Each of these programs is organized by a tender in which institutions must meet. The Campus du plateau de Saclay (Saclay campus) receives a billion of euros.

== Bibliography ==
- La gestion de leur patrimoine immobilier par les universités, condition d’une autonomie assumée (Management of their property by universities, provided autonomy assumed) (Cour des comptes)
- Jean-Léonce Dupont, Voyage au bout… de l'immobilier universitaire (Jean-Léonce Dupont, Journey to the end... of the university buildings), 18 March 2003 () (Sénat)
- « Le programme U3M (université du troisième millénaire) » Bernard Toulemonde, Le système éducatif en France (U3M program (University of the Third Millennium)), La Documentation française, Paris, 2003, (ISBN 2-11-005380-1), p. 104
