= Laboratoire de droit des affaires et nouvelles technologies =

French research laboratory

The Laboratoire de droit des affaires et nouvelles technologies (DANTE, Center for Business Law and New Technologies) is a French laboratory created in 1997. From the beginning, the Center has been characterized by its multidisciplinary approach, collaborating on projects with computing, economics, or sociology research centers. The research themes are : contracts, competition, market, corporate organization and governance, corporate law, labor and employment law, social and environmental regulation, international commercial arbitration, intellectual property and information technology law, personal data, digital law and networks. It is managed by the Versailles Saint-Quentin-en-Yvelines University.
