= New University =

New University or new university may refer to:

- New University (newspaper), a student newspaper at the University of California, Irvine
- New university (more commonly known as Post-1992 University) in the United Kingdom, institutions of higher education given university status in 1992
- New University of Lisbon, Portugal
- New University Television, a student television station at the University of Calgary
- Universités nouvelles in France, eight unaffiliated universities created during the 1990s
- University of Ulster at Coleraine, founded as the New University of Ulster
- Russian New University, a non-profit institution of higher education
