= Christian Serre =

French chemist (born 1970)

- Born: 27 August 1970 (age 56)
- Occupations: Chemist and academic

Academic background
- Education: Eng. M.Sc. Ph.D.
- Alma mater: École Supérieure de Physique et de Chimie Industrielles de la Ville de Paris; Université Paris VI; University of Versailles Saint-Quentin-en-Yvelines

Academic work
- Institutions: Paris Sciences et Lettres University; University of Versailles Saint-Quentin-en-Yvelines

Christian Serre (born 27 August 1970) is a French chemist and academic. He is a research director at the National Center for Scientific Research (CNRS) and the head of the Institute of Porous Materials of Paris.

Serre's research interests include the synthesis and applications of porous hybrid solids, such as metal-organic frameworks. He has received the CNRS Bronze Medal, the Solid State Chemistry Award from the French Chemical Society, and the Berthelot Medal from the French Academy of Sciences. He is also an elected member of the French Academy of Sciences.

== Education ==
Serre earned an engineering degree from the École Supérieure de Physique et de Chimie Industrielles de la Ville de Paris (ESPCI) in 1994. He completed an M.Sc. in Physical Chemistry at Université Paris VI in 1995. In 1999, he received his Ph.D. in Materials Chemistry from the University of Versailles Saint-Quentin-en-Yvelines.

== Career ==
Serre's academic career includes his appointment as a CNRS research scientist at the Université de Versailles Saint-Quentin-en-Yvelines from 2001 to 2009. He then became CNRS research director at the same institute from 2009 to 2016. In 2016, he established the Institute of Porous Materials of Paris at the École Normale Supérieure, ESPCI Paris, the CNRS, and PSL University. He also headed the Paris region priority project 'Respore' from 2017 to 2021 and has also been a director of the 'MaTerRE' Paris region priority project. In 2021, he co-founded the startup Squair Tech.

== Research ==
Serre's research has centered on the design and applications of metal–organic frameworks (MOFs), to improve performance in advanced nanomaterials with a focus on controlled structural modifications.

Serre worked on the synthesis of iron-, chromium- and aluminum based MIL series, demonstrating how typology control and linker functionalization can be used to tune pore environments and generate large-pore, robust structures. He has also highlighted the scale-up and development of “green” MOFs, for sustainable synthesis practices on MOF structure and performance.

Serre's research on robust scalable MOFs has explored polymorphism, hydrophilicity, and water adsorption.

In the area of nanomaterials, Serre has worked on biocompatible biodegradable MOF nanoparticles for imaging and targeted delivery and has introduced synthesis routes that enabled uniform MOF nanoparticles.

== Awards and honors ==
- 2006 – Bronze Medal, Centre National de la Recherche Scientifique (CNRS)
- 2011 – Solid State Chemistry Award, French Chemical Society
- 2016 – Berthelot Medal, French Academy of Sciences
- 2024 – Member, French Academy of Sciences

== Selected articles ==
- Serre, C.; Millange, F.; Thouvenot, C.; Nogues, M.; Marsolier, G.; Loüer, D.; Férey, G. (2002). "Very High Breathing Effect in the First Nanoporous Chromium(III)-based Solids: MIL-53 or CrIII(OH).{O2C-C6H4-CO2}.{HO2C-C6H4-CO2H}x.H2Oy". Journal of the American Chemical Society. 124 (45): 13519–13526. doi:10.1021/ja0276974. PMID 12418906.
- Serre, C.; Millange, F.; Surblé, S.; Férey, G. (2004). "A route to the synthesis of trivalent transition-metal porous carboxylates with trimeric secondary building units". Angewandte Chemie International Edition. 43 (46): 6285–6289. doi:10.1002/anie.200454250. PMID 15372643.
- Férey, G.; Mellot-Draznieks, C.; Serre, C.; Millange, F.; Dutour, J; Surblé, S; Margiolaki, I (2005). "A chromium terephthalate-based solid with unusually large pore volumes and surface area". Science. 309 (5743): 2040–2042. Bibcode:2005Sci...309.2040F. doi:10.1126/science.1116275. PMID 16179475.
- Serre, C.; Mellot-Draznieks, C.; Surblé, S.; Audebrand, N; Filinchuk, Y.; Férey, G. (2007). "Role of solvent-host interactions that lead to very large swelling of hybrid frameworks". Science. 315 (5820): 1828–1831. Bibcode:2007Sci...315.1828S. doi:10.1126/science.1137975. PMID 17395825.
- Dan-Hardi, M.; Serre, C.; Frot, T.; Rozes, L.; Maurin, G.; Sanchez, C.; Férey, G. (2009). "A New Photoactive Crystalline Highly Porous Titanium(IV) Dicarboxylate". Journal of the American Chemical Society. 131 (31): 10857–10859. Bibcode:2009JAChS.13110857D. doi:10.1021/ja903726m. PMID 19621926.
- Horcajada, P.; Chalati, T.; Serre, C.; Gillet, B.; Sebrie, C.; Baati, T.; Eubank, J. F; Heurtaux, D. (2010). "Porous metal-organic-framework nanoscale carriers as a potential platform for drug delivery and imaging". Nature Materials. 9 (2): 172–178. Bibcode:2010NatMa...9..172H. doi:10.1038/nmat2608. PMID 20010827.
- Cadiau, Amandine; Lee, Ji Sun; Damasceno Borges, Daiane; et al. (2015). "Design of Hydrophilic Metal Organic Framework Water Adsorbents for Heat Reallocation". Advanced Materials. 27 (32): 4775–4780. Bibcode:2015AdM....27.4775C. doi:10.1002/adma.201502418. PMID 26193346.
- Wang, Sujing; Lee, Ji Sun; Wahiduzzaman, Mohammad; Park, Jaedeuk; et al. (2018). "A robust large-pore zirconium carboxylate metal–organic framework for energy-efficient water-sorption-driven refrigeration". Nature Energy. 3 (11): 985–993. Bibcode:2018NatEn...3..985W. doi:10.1038/s41560-018-0261-6.
- Daturi, Marco; Blasin-Aubé, Vanessa; Yoon, Ji Wong; Bazin, Philippe; Vimont, Alexandre; et al. (2024). "Room Temperature Reduction of Nitrogen Oxide on Iron Metal–Organic Frameworks". Advanced Materials. 36 (31) 2403053. Bibcode:2024AdM....3603053D. doi:10.1002/adma.202403053. PMID 38767509.
