= François Robinet =

French historian

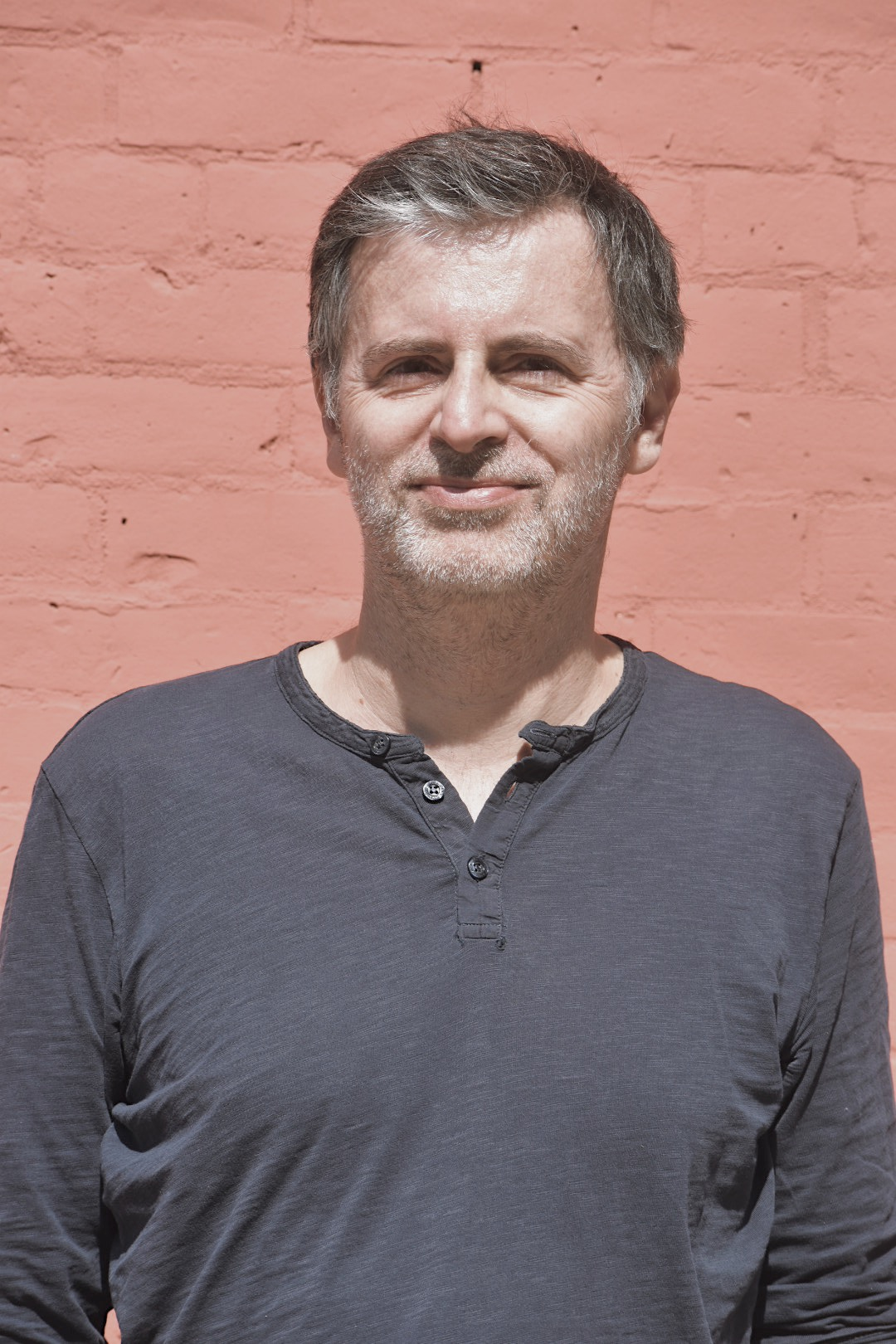
Robinet in 2024

François Robinet is a French contemporary historian and maître de conférences (associate professor) at the Université de Versailles Saint-Quentin-en-Yvelines (Université Paris-Saclay), and a member of the Centre d'Histoire Culturelle des Sociétés Contemporaines (CHCSC). He is currently a Visiting Professor at New York University (NYU), within the Department of French Literature, Thought and Culture and the Institute of French Studies.

== Academic career and education ==
A former student at the Université François-Rabelais de Tours, François Robinet obtained the agrégation in history in 1999. He taught for several years at the Lycée Voltaire in Orléans-La Source. In 2012, he defended a PhD in contemporary history, devoted to the role of French media in African conflicts, particularly the genocide against the Tutsi in Rwanda. Since 2013, he has been a maître de conférences at the Université de Versailles Saint-Quentin-en-Yvelines, where he served as director of the Graduate School Humanités – Sciences du Patrimoine at Université Paris-Saclay. He also taught at Sciences Po Paris within the Reims campus Africa program.

Since 2024, Robinet has been a Visiting Professor at the Institute of French Studies at New York University (NYU). François Robinet is involved in public history and the dissemination of historical research. He frequently appears in French media ( France 24) to discuss memory and media narratives of the genocide against the Tutsi and Franco-African relations. He also founded the festival Les Médiatiques (created in Orléans in 2012), which brings together scholars, journalists, and students to discuss transformations in the media landscape and public communication.

== Research ==
His research focuses primarily on:

- The history, narratives, and memory of the 1994 genocide against the Tutsi in Rwanda;
- The history of French media and their coverage of African conflicts;
- Franco-African relations from political, memorial, and institutional perspectives;
- Archival policies and the writing of history in postcolonial contexts;
- The political and social uses of the past.

== Selected publications ==
=== Books and edited volumes ===
- Silences et récits. Les médias français à l'épreuve des conflits africains (1994–2015) (Silences and Narratives: French Media and African Conflicts, 1994-2015), INA Éditions, 2016.
- Histoire de la presse en France. XXe-XXIe siècle (History of the Press in France, 20th–21st Century), with Christian Delporte and Claire Blandin, Armand Colin, 2016.
- Rwanda 1994-2014. Histoire, mémoires et récits (Rwanda 1994-2014: History, Memories and Narratives), co-editor, Les Presses du réel, 2017.
- L'Histoire culturelle au prisme des Studies (Cultural History through the Lens of "Studies"), dossier co-edited with Brigitte Rollet, Sophie Croisy and Lise Guilhamon, Diogène, 2019.
- Penser l'histoire des médias (Thinking the History of Media), collective volume co-edited with Valérie Schafer and Claire Blandin, CNRS Éditions, 2019.
- Le génocide des Tutsi rwandais (avril-juillet 1994) et son après-coup (The Rwandan Genocide of the Tutsi (April–July 1994) and Its Aftermath), dossier co-edited with Stéphane Audoin-Rouzeau, Annette Becker, Hélène Dumas and Samuel Kuhn, Historiens & Géographes, no. 457, 2022.
- Métiers et professions des médias (Media Occupations and Professions), dossier co-edited with François Vallotton and Emmanuelle Paccaud, Le Temps des Médias, no. 41, 2023/1.
- Rwanda 1994. Archives, mémoires, héritages (Rwanda 1994: Archives, Memories, Legacies), dossier co-edited with Rémi Korman, Matériaux pour l'histoire de notre temps, nos 151-152, 2024/1.

=== Articles and book chapters ===
- "Trente ans de négation du génocide des Tutsi: genèse, déploiement, (re)configurations" (Thirty Years of Denial of the Genocide Against the Tutsi: Genesis, Development, and Reconfigurations), Revue d'Histoire de la Shoah, no. 221-1, 2025.
- "Le Rwanda, si loin, si proche" (Rwanda, So Far, So Close), in S. Audoin-Rouzeau, A. Becker, S. Kuhn, J. Schreiber (eds.), Le choc. Rwanda 1994: le génocide des Tutsi (The Shock: Rwanda 1994, the Genocide Against the Tutsi), Gallimard, 2024.
- "L'archive retrouvée. Enquêter sur le rôle de la France au Rwanda" (The Rediscovered Archive: Investigating France's Role in Rwanda), Revue d'histoire moderne & contemporaine, 2022/1.
- "L'écriture de l'histoire du génocide des Tutsi: un état des lieux" (Writing the History of the Genocide Against the Tutsi: A State of the Field), in V. Brinker (ed.), Enseigner le génocide des Tutsi au Rwanda (Teaching the Genocide Against the Tutsi in Rwanda), Dijon, EUD, 2016.
- "Retour au pays, retour à la vie. Le Rwanda à la télévision française depuis 1994" (Returning Home, Returning to Life: Rwanda on French Television Since 1994), in Rwanda 1994-2014, Les Presses du réel, 2017.
- "Génocide des Tutsi du Rwanda: Réflexions sur l'histoire" (Genocide of the Tutsi in Rwanda: Reflections on History), lecture at the NYU Institute of French Studies Lecture Series, 2024.

== Academic responsibilities ==
- Director of the Graduate School Humanités – Sciences du Patrimoine at Université Paris-Saclay (2020–2024).
- Member of the Conseil National des Universités (Section 22) (2019–2023).
- Member of the Board of Directors, Université de Versailles Saint-Quentin-en-Yvelines (2020–2024).
- Visiting Professor at New York University (2024–2026).
