= Centre d'études sur la mondialisation, les conflits, les territoires et les vulnérabilités =

French research laboratory

Coordinates: 48.7802°N 2.0443°E

The Centre d’études sur la mondialisation, les conflits, les territoires et les vulnérabilités (CEMOTEV, Centre for Study on Globalisation, Conflicts, Territories and Vulnerabilities) is a French laboratory created in 2010.

CEMOTEV specializes in conflicts, environmental issues, development, vulnerabilities and globalisation CEMOTEV is managed by the Versailles Saint-Quentin-en-Yvelines University.
