= University of Paris (disambiguation) =

The University of Paris or Université de Paris was a historic university in France (1150–1970).

"University of Paris", "Université de Paris", or "Université Paris" may also refer to:

- University of Paris (2019)
- University of Paris I
- University of Paris II
- University of Paris III
- University of Paris IV
- University of Paris V
- University of Paris VI
- University of Paris VII
- University of Paris VIII
- University of Paris IX
- University of Paris X
- University of Paris XI
- University of Paris XII
- University of Paris XIII
- University of Paris-Est
- University of Paris-Est Marne-la-Vallée
- University of Paris-Est Créteil

== See also ==
- List of universities and higher education institutions in the Paris region
