= Vélizy-Villacoublay =

- Commune
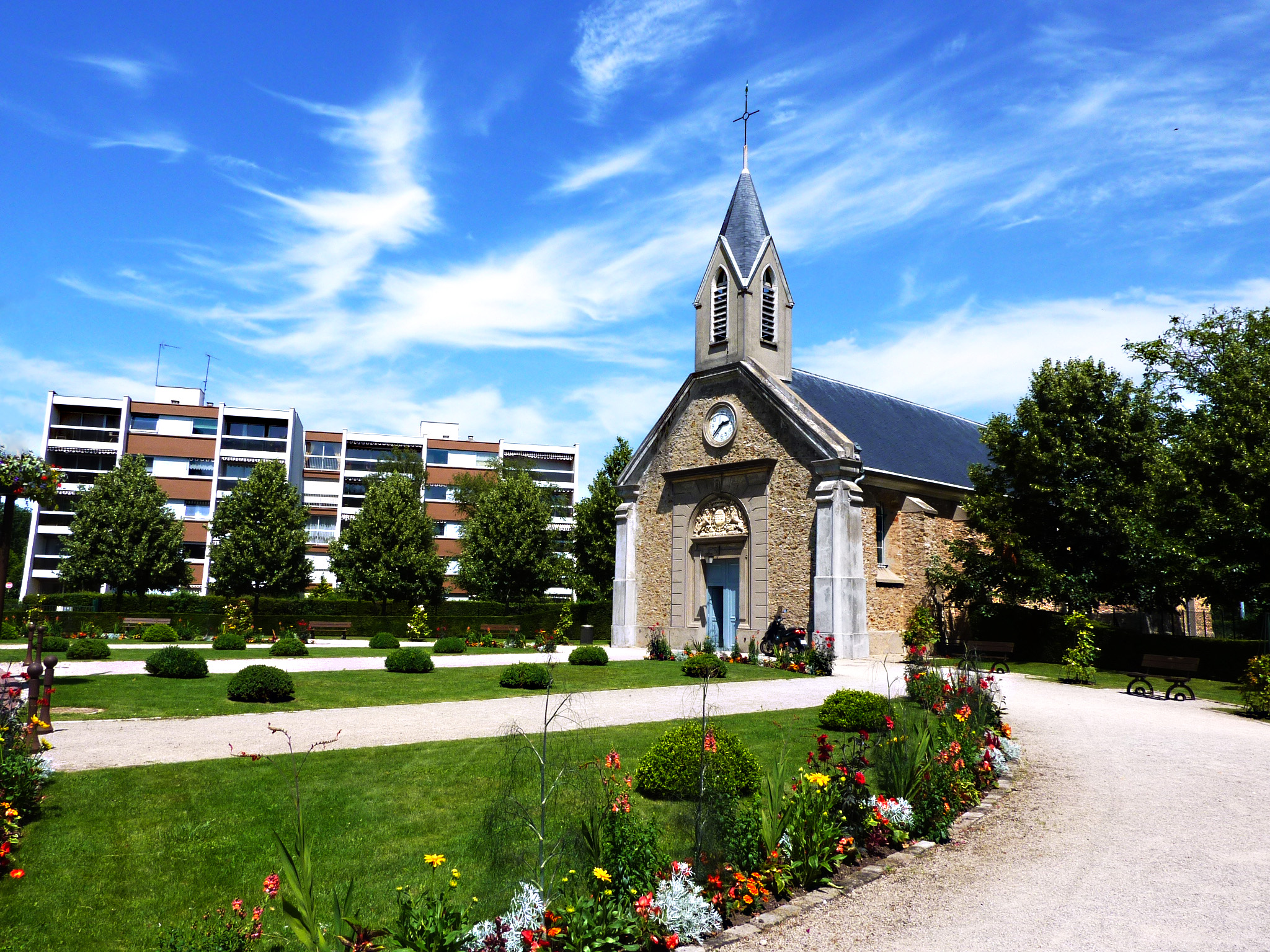
- The church of Saint-Denis, in Vélizy-Villacoublay

- Coat of arms
- Location of Vélizy-Villacoublay
- Location within France Location within Île-de-France (region)
- Coordinates: 48°47′00″N 2°11′00″E
- Country: France
- Region: Île-de-France
- Department: Yvelines
- Arrondissement: Versailles
- Canton: Versailles-2
- Intercommunality: CA Versailles Grand Parc

Government
  - Mayor (2020–2026): Pascal Thévenot
- Area^{1}: 9.09 km^{2} (3.51 sq mi)
- Highest elevation: 179 m (587 ft)
- Lowest elevation: 102 m (335 ft)
- Population (2023): 23,011
  - Density: 2,530/km^{2} (6,560/sq mi)
- Time zone: UTC+01:00 (CET)
  - Summer (DST): UTC+02:00 (CEST)
- INSEE/Postal code: 78640 /78140
- ^{1} French Land Register data, which excludes lakes, ponds, glaciers > 1 km^{2} (0.386 sq mi or 247 acres) and river estuaries.

Vélizy-Villacoublay (French pronunciation: [velizi vilakublɛ]) is a commune in the Yvelines department in the Île-de-France in north-central France. It is located in the south-western suburbs of Paris 13.9 km (8.6 mi) from the center and 3.2 km (2.0 mi) east of Versailles. Its inhabitants are called Véliziens.

== Geography ==
Established on the Parisian plateau, the town of Vélizy-Villacoublay borders Meudon in the north-east, Clamart in the east, Bièvres in the south-east, Viroflay in the north-west, and Chaville in the north.

Vélizy-Villacoublay is a very urbanized town bordering the Meudon forest, which spans over 300 hectares (741 acres) of communal land.

There are six districts: Mozart, le Clos, le Mail, Louvois, la Pointe Ouest et Vélizy-le-Bas (with l'Ursine and le Bocage).

== History ==
The word "Vélizy" comes from the Latin word villa. "Villacoublay" is formed from the same word, combined with the Gallo-Roman patronym "Escoblenus". Originally called simply Vélizy, the name of the commune became officially Vélizy-Villacoublay in 1938.

The territory was formed from three distinct manors: Vélizy, Villacoublay, and Ursine, established in the 11th century. The domains were progressively annexed into the royal estate beginning in the 12th century (Vélizy was annexed at the end of the 13th century).

The airbase in Villacoublay, Vélizy-Villacoublay Air Base, was built in 1911. In 1974 the Vélizy 2 shopping mall was opened.

The body of Diana, Princess of Wales was flown from Vélizy-Villacoublay Air Base to RAF Northolt, west London, after her death in Paris on August 31, 1997.

== Population ==
Historical population

Year	Pop.	±% p.a.
1793	168	—
1821	200	+0.62%
1846	221	+0.40%
1872	206	−0.27%
1901	230	+0.38%
1906	294	+5.03%
1911	438	+8.30%
1921	1,487	+13.00%
1926	2,246	+8.60%
1931	3,673	+10.34%
1936	4,175	+2.60%
1946	3,773	−1.01%

Year	Pop.	±% p.a.
1954	6,075	+6.13%
1962	6,402	+0.66%
1968	15,471	+15.84%
1975	22,611	+5.57%
1982	22,430	−0.11%
1990	20,725	−0.98%
1999	20,342	−0.21%
2007	19,994	−0.22%
2012	21,104	+1.09%
2017	22,036	+0.87%
2023	23,011	+0.72%

Source: EHESS and INSEE (1968-2023)

== Main sights ==
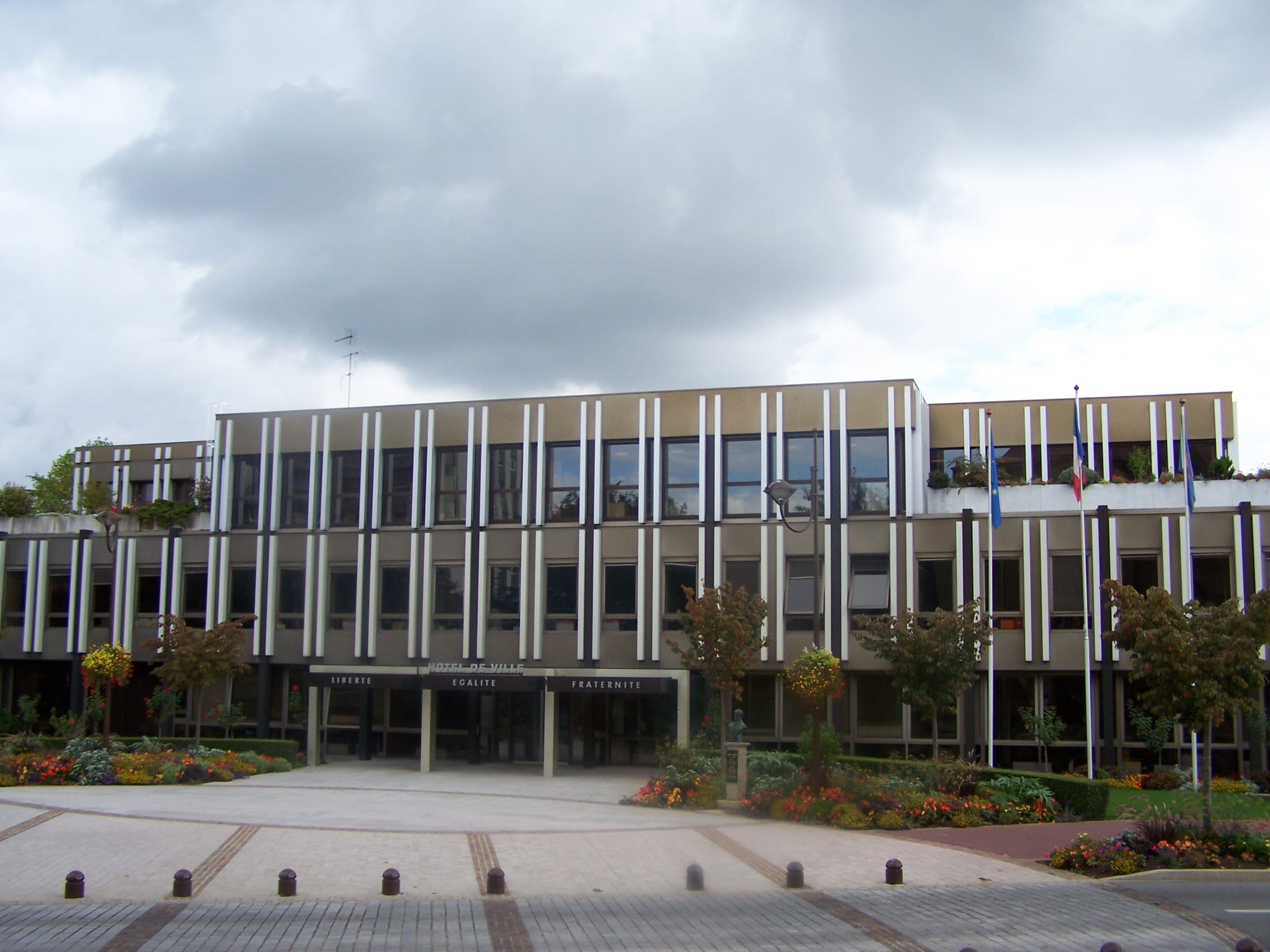
The Hôtel de Ville

- The Saint-Denis church
- The Saint-Jean-Baptiste church, in modern style.
- The barracks of the Compagnies Républicaines de Sécurité (CRS).
- l'Onde Cultural Center, finished in December 2000 and designed by the architect Claude Vasconi, which is composed of one hall with 670 seats, a multidisciplinary room of 200 seats, two large dance halls, an orchestra room, 12 studios, 4 classrooms, a recording room, and a percussion room.
- The Hôtel de Ville, which was completed in 1974.

== Transport ==
Vélizy-Villacoublay is served by no station of the Paris Métro, RER, or suburban rail network. The closest station to Vélizy-Villacoublay is Chaville–Vélizy station on Paris RER line C. This station is located in the neighboring commune of Viroflay, 1.7 km (1.1 mi) from the town center of Vélizy-Villacoublay. Since 2014, Vélizy-Villacoublay has been served by tramway line T6 with 7 stations.

The town is also served by the A86 autoroute, the 118 national route (RN118), and the RN286. The A86 includes a two-leveled tunnel between Rueil-Malmaison and Vélizy-Villacoublay. It is also served by a Veolia Transport bus line (Connex), of the RATP,

== Economy ==
- Biggest Shopping Center of Île-de-France: Vélizy-2
- Car dealerships: Porsche, Audi, BMW, Mini, Citroën
- Numerous companies and offices:
  - Aeronautic: EADS, MBDA, Messier-Dowty, Messier-Bugatti
  - Agricultural: Kraft Foods
  - Automotive: manufacturing plants of PSA Peugeot Citroën, Renault Trucks
  - Biotechnology: Novacyt
  - Building and Public Works Sector: Eiffage
  - Electronics: Thales, Ateme, Dassault Systèmes.
  - Research: Laboratoire d'ingénierie des systèmes de Versailles
  - Telecommunications: Alcatel-Lucent, Bouygues Télécom, Ekinops, Transcom, Sagem
  - Information technology: Sun Microsystems, Dassault Systèmes, Quintiles/IMS Health
  - Video Games: Blizzard (Vivendi-Universal Games)
- French Air Force Base 107 Vélizy – Villacoublay Air Base (HQ of French Special Forces)
- Group 61 of the CRS

== Government ==
The area has the head office of the Bureau enquêtes accidents pour la sécurité de l'aéronautique d'État (BEA-É), an agency of the French Ministry of Defence which investigates incidents and accidents involving government and military aircraft. It is on the property of the Vélizy-Villacoublay Air Base (Base 107).

== Education ==
Post-secondary education:

- ISTY
- University Institute of Technology of Vélizy
- Versailles Saint-Quentin-en-Yvelines University

There are nine elementary school groups in the commune:

- École Ferdinand Buisson
- École Exelmans
- École Alfred Fronval
- École Jean Macé
- École Jean Mermoz
- École Mozart
- École Henri Rabourdin
- École René Dorme
- École Simone Veil

Two junior high schools are in the commune: Collège Maryse Bastié and Collège Saint-Exupéry.

Residents of the commune go to Versailles to attend senior high school/sixth-form college.

== Twin towns – sister cities ==
Vélizy-Villacoublay is twinned with:

- Alytus, Lithuania
- Dietzenbach, Germany
- Harlow, England, United Kingdom

== See also ==
- Communes of the Yvelines department
