= Pierre-Hugues Barré =

French legal scholar

- Born: c. 1994 (age 31–32)
- Education: University of Versailles; University of Toulouse; Sorbonne; Oxford University
- Scientific career
- Fields: Jurisprudence Constitutional law
- Institutions: Sciences Po Paris

Pierre-Hugues Barré (born c. 1994) is a French lawyer and academic. Before becoming a senior lecturer at Sciences Po Paris, he clerked for Nelly Khouzam of the United States Court of Appeals for the Second Circuit. Pierre-Hugues Barré is well known for his work in religious freedom and philosophy of law.

== Career ==
He received a Bachelor of Law, a bachelor in Political Science, a bachelor in Philosophy and a bachelor in History from the University of Versailles and Sorbonne as well as a PhD from the University of Toulouse, with Jeremy Jennings on his dissertation jury.

Since 2023, Pierre-Hugues has been editor of Revue de philosophie du droit, the only academic journal in paper format on the philosophy of law in France.

He is a senior lecturer at Sciences Po Paris where he teaches constitutional law and political ideas.

In addition, he was visiting professor at Oxford University and he is visiting professor at the Masaryk University in Brno.

== Bibliography (non-exhaustive) ==
=== Book ===
- La séparation impossible, Le Cerf, 2025, 600 p.

=== Articles ===
- "Les restrictions à l'instruction en famille : un moyen de lutter contre les séparatismes ?" in AJDA, 2021, p. 2094.
- "Un paradoxe français : les lois de 1901 et 1904 et les congrégations religieuses" in RFDA, 2021, p. 254.
- "Faltering Democracy in France", Law & Liberty, February 7, 2022.
- Who Killed Lola?, Newsweek, Nov 03, 2022
- "Le contrôle de constitutionnalité dans l’Antiquité athénienne : l’exemple de la graphê paranômon" in RFDC, n° 135, p. 699-706.
- "La critique du « gouvernement des juges » à l’école de Jeremy Waldron", Jus Publicum, Presses universitaires de Rennes, 2024, p. 23-32.
- "Le ministre du culte est-il un professionnel ? Tour d’horizon des législations applicables", Duc in altum !, Mares & Martin, 2025, p. 27-40.
- "Laïcité. Pie X face à la loi de 1905", Revue Conflits, September 14, 2025.
- "Le non-subventionnement public des cultes : un principe vidé de sa substance", Atlantico, 2025.

== Awards and honours ==
- National Defence Medal.
