= Institut d'études culturelles et internationales =

French Institute

The Institut d'études culturelles et internationales is the first institute, in France, entirely devoted to cultural activities and research on cultural and intercultural issues.

It has three colleges (History, Letters and Languages) and two research laboratories:

- The "Center for the Cultural History of Contemporary Societies";
- The Laboratory "Heritage and Cultural Dynamics".

It offers Bachelors and Masters programs in these fields. It is managed by the Versailles Saint-Quentin-en-Yvelines University.
