= Roland Guillon =

French sociologist

Roland Guillon (born 1942) is a French sociologist, known both for his work on the problems of employment and capital, and particularly, for his innovative approach to jazz.

He is a research engineer at the Centre for Economics and Ethics on Environment and Development at the University of Versailles Saint-Quentin-en-Yvelines. A specialist in employment and training, he has undertaken several missions in West Africa.

He is behind the definition of the term New Wave in jazz. Inspired by what was called New Thing in the late 1950s, Guillon believes that the term is inappropriate and replaces thing with wave, a word which connotes movement, perhaps to signify the permanence of swing.

New Wave is a synthesis of two main jazz styles, hard bop and free jazz. New Wave composers or artists include, but are not limited to, artists involved in both styles.

In La New Wave, un jazz de l'entre deux, Guillon establishes a chronology of the style and analyzes several albums key to understanding the movement. Ornette Coleman, John Coltrane and Don Cherry are illustrious members, as well as lesser-known musicians such as Prince Lasha.

== Bibliography ==
=== Sociology ===
- Les Syndicats dans les mutations et la crise de l'emploi (Unions in mutations and employment crisis), Paris, L'Harmattan, 1997
- Environnement et emploi : quelles approches syndicales ? (Environment and employment: what approaches a union?), Paris, L'Harmattan, 1998
- Recherches sur l'emploi, éléments de sociologie de l'activité économique (Research on employment, elements of sociology of economic activity), Paris, L'Harmattan, 1999
- Syndicats et mondialisation, une stratification de l'union syndical (Unions and globalization, stratification of the labor union), Paris, L'Harmattan, 2000
- Formation continue et mutation de l'emploi (Training and employment change), Paris, L'Harmattan, 2002
- Regards croisés sur le capital social (Perspectives on social capital), Paris, L'Harmattan, 2003
- Les Tensions sur l'activité en Afrique de l'ouest (Tensions on the activity in West Africa), Paris, L'Harmattan, 2004
- Classes dirigeantes et universités dans la mondialisation (Ruling classes and universities in globalization), Paris, L'Harmattan, 2004
- Sociologie de l'activité, une lecture critique de la globalisation (Sociology of work, a critical reading of globalization), Paris, L'Harmattan, 2005
- Les Avatars d'une pensée dirigeante, le cas du parti socialiste (Avatars of thought leadership, the case of the Socialist Party), Paris, L'Harmattan, 2006

=== Jazz ===
- Le Hard Bop, un style de jazz (Hard Bop, a style of jazz), Paris, L'Harmattan, 1999
- Le Jazz de quatre cités, Hard bopper de Chicago (The four cities of Jazz, Hard bopper from Chicago), Détroit, Pittsburgh et Philadelphie, Paris, L'Harmattan, 2001
- Musiciens de jazz new-yorkais, Le hard bopper (Jazz musicians of New York, the hard bopper), Paris, L'Harmattan, 2003
- Anthologie du Hard Bop, L'éclat du jazz noir américain (Hard Bop Anthology, The brightness of the black American jazz), Paris, L'Harmattan, 2005
- La New Wave, un jazz de l'entre deux (The New Wave, a jazz of the two), Paris, L'Harmattan, 2007
- L'empreinte de Parker, Gillespie et Ellington sur le jazz des années 1950–1960 (The footprint of Parker, Gillespie and Ellington on the jazz of the 1950s–1960s), Paris, L'Harmattan, 2011
