= Versailles Saint-Quentin-en-Yvelines Observatory =

Astronomical observatory in France

Coordinates: 48.7779123°N 2.048576300000036°E

The Versailles Saint-Quentin-en-Yvelines Observatory is an astronomical observatory affiliated with the Versailles Saint-Quentin-en-Yvelines University. Built in Guyancourt, France in 2009, it focuses on the fields of climate change and sustainable development.

== See also ==
- List of astronomical observatories
