= René Huguenin Hospital =

- Curie Institute
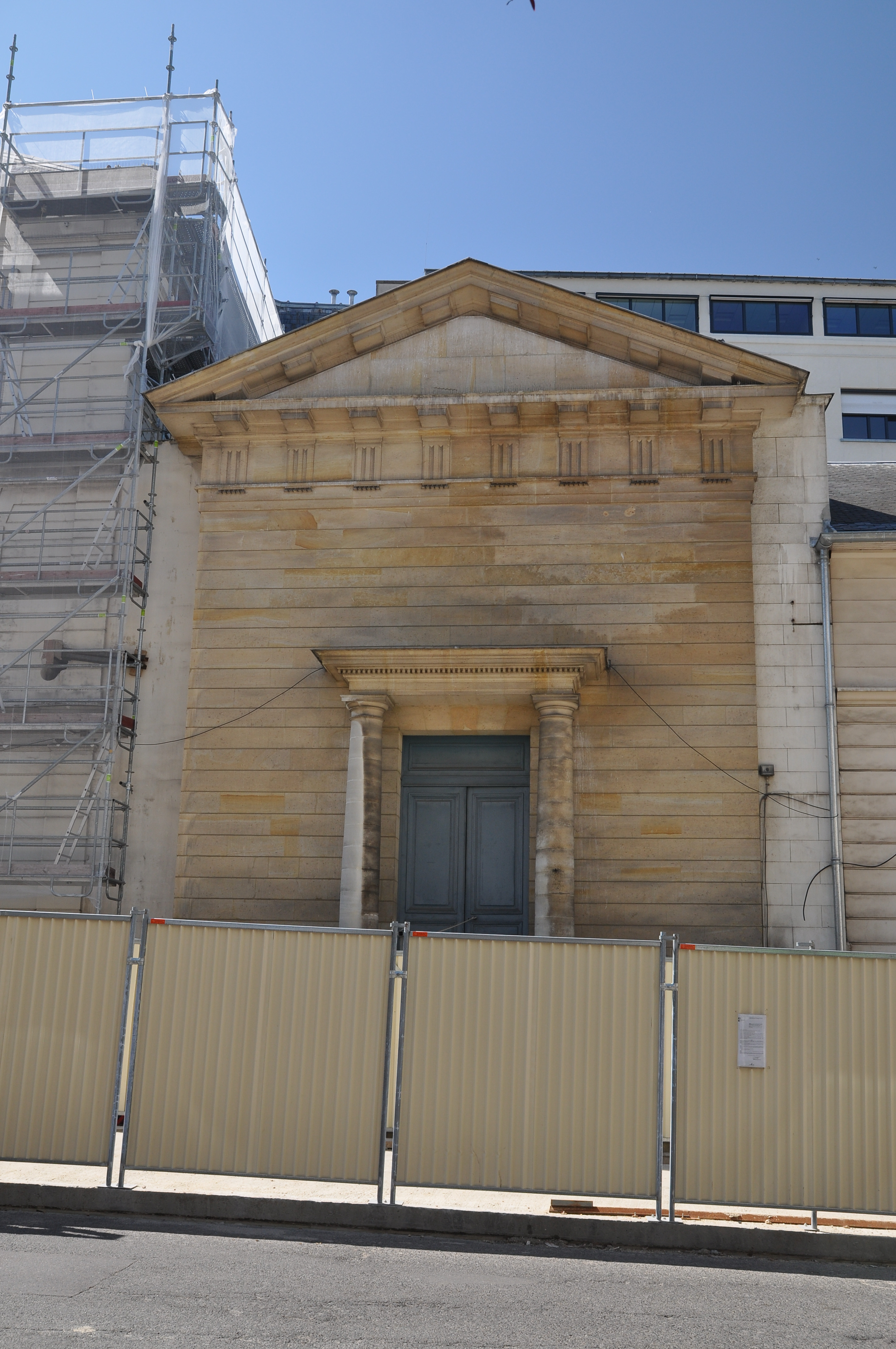
- Former Saint-Cloud Hospital

Geography
- Location: Saint-Cloud, Île-de-France, France
- Coordinates: 48.8447941°N 2.217725°E

Organisation
- Care system: Public
- Type: Teaching

Services
- Emergency department: Yes
- Beds: 146

History
- Opened: 2010

Links
- Website: curie.fr/liste/lhopital-de-saint-cloud
- Lists: Hospitals in France

The René Huguenin Hospital is a teaching hospital in Saint-Cloud, France. Part of the Curie Institute and a teaching hospital of Versailles Saint-Quentin-en-Yvelines University.

Established in 2010, it was named in honour of René Huguenin (1894–1955), oncologist, Professor of Pathology and a former director of the Institut Gustave Roussy.
