= Mantes University Technical Institute =

Coordinates: 48°59′47.813″N 1°42′36.547″E

- Type: Public, University technical institute
- Established: 2001
- Affiliations: University of Versailles Saint-Quentin-en-Yvelines
- President: Samir Allal
- Location: Mantes-la-Jolie, France
- Website: http://www.iut-mantes.uvsq.fr

The Mantes University Technical Institute (IUT of Mantes en Yvelines, French: Institut universitaire de technologie de Mantes en Yvelines) is one of the French university technical institutes.

It is part of University of Versailles Saint-Quentin-en-Yvelines and located at Mantes-la-Jolie. It trains students in two or three years after the Baccalaureate. It allows the preparation of a three-year undergraduate technical diploma called a Diplôme universitaire de technologie (BUT) (Associate of Science) and a three-year undergraduate technical diploma called a Licence professionnelle (professional Bachelor).

== History ==
The IUT of Mantes en Yvelines was created in 2001 as a component of the University of Versailles Saint-Quentin-en-Yvelines.

== Faculties ==
This IUT has 5 faculties:

- Management and Administrations
- Industrial Engineering and Maintenance
- Marketing techniques
- Civil engineering
- Health, Safety and Environment
