= Vélizy University Technical Institute =

Division of the University of Versailles in France

Coordinates: 48°46′55″N 2°13′01″E

- Institut Universitaire de Technologie de Vélizy
- Type: Public, University Technical Institute
- Established: 1991
- Affiliations: University of Versailles Saint-Quentin-en-Yvelines
- President: Stéphane Delaplace
- Students: 1,100
- Location: Vélizy-Villacoublay, Rambouillet, France
- Website: http://www.iut-velizy.uvsq.fr

The Vélizy University Technical Institute (IUT de Vélizy, French: Institut universitaire de technologie de Vélizy) is one of the French university technical institute.

It is part of University of Versailles and located at Vélizy-Villacoublay. It trains students in two or three years after the Baccalaureate. It allows the preparation of a two-year undergraduate technical and vocational diploma called a Diplôme universitaire de technologie (DUT) and a three-year undergraduate technical diploma called a Licence professionnelle (professional bachelor's degree).

== History ==
The Vélizy University Technical Institute was created in September 1991 as a component of the University of Versailles.

== Faculties ==
This IUT has seven faculties located on two campuses :

- Vélizy-Villacoublay : Electrical Engineering and Computer Science, Computers - option Computer Engineering, Telecommunications and Networks, Services and Communication Networks.
- Rambouillet : Chemical Engineering - Process Engineering - Bioprocess option, Administration and Commercial management, Marketing Techniques
