= ISTY =

French public engineering school

Coordinates: 48.809889°N 2.148353°E

Institut des Sciences et Techniques des Yvelines
- Type: Grande école
- Established: 1992
- Affiliations: Elles Bougent
- President: Mohamed KRIR
- Location: Vélizy, France
- Campus: Vélizy and Mantes-la-Ville
- Website: www.isty.uvsq.fr

The Institut des Sciences et Techniques des Yvelines or ISTY is a French public engineering school specialized in the field of computer science and mechatronics, attached to the Versailles Saint-Quentin-en-Yvelines University.
