= Jean-Charles Darmon =

French literary critic

- Born: Darmon; 1961 (age 64–65)
- Education: École Normale Supérieure
- Occupation: Teacher of French literature
- Employer: Versailles Saint-Quentin-en-Yvelines University
- Known for: Literary critics

Jean-Charles Darmon is a French literary critic born in 1961.

== Biography ==
After entering the École Normale Supérieure in 1982, his first teaching post was at Amherst College (USA). While a fellow of the Fondation Thiers, he completed his thesis titled Philosophie épicurienne et littérature au xviie siècle en France : études sur Gassendi, Cyrano de Bergerac, La Fontaine, Saint-Évremond (Epicurean philosophy and literature in seventeenth-century France: studies on Gassendi, Cyrano de Bergerac, La Fontaine, Saint-Evremond), concerning the heterodox currents of thought in classical France.

He is Professor of French literature at the Versailles Saint-Quentin-en-Yvelines University, Honorary Member of the Institut Universitaire de France (2001-2006) and from 2005 to 2009 he was deputy director of the École Normale Supérieure.

A specialist in connections between literature, philosophy and ethics in the classical age, he is the author of numerous books on Erudite Libertinism and Epicureanism and the forms of fable and satire from an interdisciplinary perspective.

His editions of La Fontaine and Cyrano de Bergerac, "swordsman scholar and polygraph" seized by a "demon of freedom", are now considered reference works.

== Bibliography ==
- Philosophie épicurienne et littérature au xviie siècle en France. Études sur Gassendi, Cyrano, La Fontaine, Saint-Évremond (Epicurean philosophy and literature in seventeenth-century France. Studies on Gassendi, Cyrano, La Fontaine, Saint-Evremond), Paris, PUF, « Perspectives littéraires », 1998.
- Cyrano de Bergerac, Lettres satiriques et amoureuses, précédées de Lettres diverses (édition) (Cyrano de Bergerac, satirical and love letters, preceded by various letters (edit)), Paris, Desjonquères, « Dix-septième siècle », 1999.
- La Fontaine, Fables (édition) (La Fontaine, Fables (edit)), Paris, LGF, 2002.
- Philosophies de la Fable. La Fontaine et la crise du lyrisme (Philosophies of Fable. La Fountaine and the crisis of lyricism), Paris, PUF, « Écritures », 2003.
- Le Songe libertin. Cyrano de Bergerac d’un monde à l’autre (The Dream libertine. Cyrano de Bergerac from one world to another), Paris, Klincksieck, « Bibliothèque française et romane », 2004.
- L’athée, la politique et la mort. Essai suivi d’une édition critique de La Mort d’Agrippine de Cyrano de Bergerac (The atheist, politics and death. Test followed by a critical edition of The Death of Agrippina from Cyrano de Bergerac), Fougères, Encre Marine, « La Bibliothèque hédoniste », 2005.
- Histoire de la France littéraire, tome 2. Classicismes xviie – xviiie siècle (Literary history of France, Volume 2. Classicisms seventeenth - eighteenth century), Paris, PUF, « Quadrige », 2006.
- Le moraliste, la politique et l’histoire. De La Rochefoucauld à Derrida (The moralist, politics and history. From De La Rochefoucauld to Derrida), Desjonquères, « L’Esprit des lettres », 2007.
- Variations épicuriennes : une philosophie et ses marges, entre science, morale et politique. Études sur Montaigne, Gassendi, Cyrano de Bergerac, Bernier, Saint-Evremond (Epicurean variations: a philosophy and margins between science, ethics and politics. Studies of Montaigne, Gassendi, Cyrano de Bergerac, Bernier, Saint-Evremond), Paris, Honoré Champion, « Lumière classique », 2008.
- Pensée morale et genres littéraires (Moral thought and literary genres), with Philippe Desan, Paris, PUF, 2009.
- Philosophie du divertissement. Le jardin imparfait des Modernes (Philosophy entertainment. Modern garden imperfect), Paris, Desjonquères, « Le bon sens », 2009.
- « Philosophies de la Fable. Poésie et pensée dans l’œuvre de La Fontaine » ("Philosophies of Fable. Poetry and thought in the work of La Fontaine "), Paris, Éditions Hermann, coll. « Savoir Lettres », 2011.
