= Bachelor universitaire de technologie =

French undergraduate-level academic degree

The bachelor universitaire de technologie (BUT, in English: "Bachelor of Technical Studies" or "Bachelor of Technical and Applied Studies") is a national vocational bachelor's degree (licence), and a national French undergraduate diploma created in 2019, awarded on completion of the first three years of study at a university technical institute (IUT). This diploma allows the intermediate award of a diplôme universitaire de technologie (DUT) from the second year of the bachelor's degree. It is awarded after three years of study, with 180 ECTS credits.

This type of bachelor's degree (licence) does not give automatic access to French master's degrees, although it is possible to apply for a master's degree on the basis of a portfolio.

It is similar to a Bachelor of Applied Science or a Bachelor of Technical and Applied Studies in the US.

== History ==
The DUT and the LP, the French vocational bachelor's degree (in French: licence professionnelle) are changing in September 2021. From that date, a new three-year diploma, the BUT, level 6 ISCED in the French Government's National Professional Qualifications Register (RNCP), conferring 180 ECTS credits, will be introduced. The BUT, a Bachelor of Applied Science, delivered by the mainstream French public university system (which explains the "university" or "universitaire" in its title), becomes the reference diploma for French university technical institutes (IUT).

== Fields of study ==
Mentions identical to the BUT specialities are defined, and allow local adaptation for a third of the hourly volume. This makes it possible to adapt training to the local context and integrate people from other courses.

There are 24 BUT specialisations:

=== Tertiary sector ===
- Legal Careers (CJ)
- Social Careers (CS)
- Administrative and Commercial Management of Organisations (GACO)
- Business and Administration Management (GEA)
- Logistics and Transport Management (MLT – formerly GLT)
- Information and Communication (Info-Com)
- Data Science (SD)
- Marketing Techniques (TC)

=== Science sector ===
- Chemistry
- Biological Engineering (GB)
- Chemical and Process Engineering (GCGP)
- Civil Engineering and Sustainable Construction (GCCD)
- Electrical Engineering and Industrial Computing (GEII or GE2I)
- Industrial Engineering and Maintenance (GIM)
- Mechanical and Production Engineering (GMP)
- Energy Transition and Efficiency (MT2E – formerly GTE)
- Health, Safety and Environment (HSE)
- Computer Science (Info)
- Physical Measurements (MP)
- Packaging and Conditioning (PEC)
- Quality, Industrial Logistics and Organisation (QLIO)
- Networks and Telecommunications (R&T)
- Materials Science and Engineering (SGM)
- Multimedia and Internet Professions (MMI)

== Admissions ==
The 2019 decree specifies the composition of the admissions panel for applicants with a baccalauréat diploma or a level 4 qualification ISCED registered on the RNCP.

== See also ==
- Bachelor of Applied Arts
- Bachelor of Applied Arts and Sciences
- Bachelor's degree
- University Technical Institutes
- Education in France
