= University of Versailles Saint-Quentin-en-Yvelines =

French public university

Coordinates: 48°47′59″N 2°08′27″E

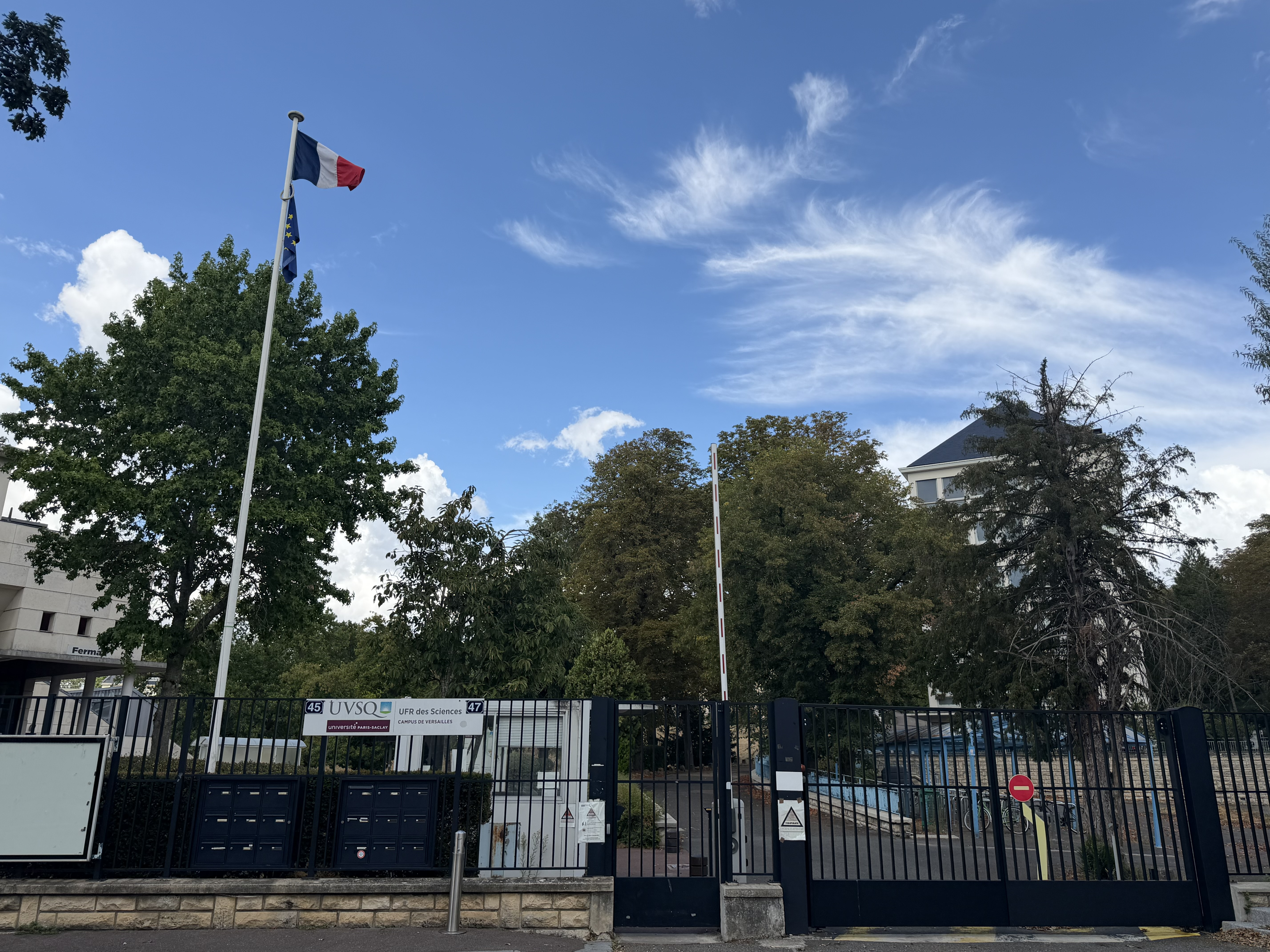
- Sciences department in Versailles
- Motto: La dynamique de la connaissance et de l'innovation
- Motto in English: The dynamics of knowledge and innovation
- Type: Public university (EPCSP)
- Established: 1991
- Affiliations: Paris-Saclay University
- Endowment: €166 M
- President: Alain Bui (since October 2017)
- Vice-president: Alexis Constantin
- Administrative staff: 752
- Students: 19,000 (in 2012)
- Doctoral students: 658 (in 2012)
- Location: 55 avenue de Paris - F-78035 Versailles, France, Versailles, Saint-Quentin-en-Yvelines, Île-de-France, France
- Campus: Versailles, Saint-Quentin-en-Yvelines, Mantes-en-Yvelines, Vélizy-Villacoublay, Rambouillet, Le Chesnay, Mantes-la-Jolie, Mantes-la-Ville
- Nickname: UVSQ
- Website: www.uvsq.fr

University of Versailles Saint-Quentin-en-Yvelines (French: Université de Versailles Saint-Quentin-en-Yvelines; UVSQ) is a French public university created in 1991, located in the department of Yvelines and, since 2002, in Hauts-de-Seine. It is a constituent university of the federal Paris-Saclay University.

Consisting of eight separate campuses, it is mainly located in the cities of Versailles, Saint-Quentin-en-Yvelines, Mantes-en-Yvelines, Vélizy-Villacoublay and Rambouillet. It is one of the five universities of the Academy of Versailles. (Note: With the universities of Paris-Nanterre, of Paris-Sud, of Évry-Val d'Essonne and of Cergy-Pontoise)

It is one of the four universités nouvelles (new universities) (Note: With the University of Évry Val d'Essonne, the Cergy-Pontoise University, the University of Marne la Vallée and the UVSQ itself) inaugurated in the Île-de-France region after the 2000 University project (French: plan université 2000). It has a population of 19,000 students, a staff of 752 people, and 1,389 teachers and researchers, as well as an additional 285 external teachers.

The university teaches courses in the fields of natural science, social science, political science, engineering, technology, and medicine. It also provides interdisciplinary courses covering the relationships across economics, ethics, natural environment and sustainable development.

== History ==
=== Origin ===
A branch of the Pierre and Marie Curie University was created in Versailles in 1987 to increase the university's capacity for enrollment. It focused on the study of science, and merged with the law annex of Paris West University Nanterre La Défense established two years earlier at Saint-Quentin-en-Yvelines. In the 1990s, the Ministry of Higher Education and Research developed the French higher education modernization plan called Université 2000, and created eight unaffiliated universities, known as new universities. The Versailles Saint-Quentin-en-Yvelines University was officially created on 22 July 1991 from the relocation of the two centres of Pierre and Marie Curie University and Paris West University Nanterre La Défense.

=== A new status ===
In 1996, the status of the university was changed by law. The law, legislated in 1984, required that the university have elected officials. Michel Garnier was its first president, and created committees that included a board of directors, a scientific council, and a student life council. Dominique Gentile was the second president, and created new annexes such as the Ph.D. School, the University Institute of Technology, and Professionalized University Institute of art, science, culture, and multimedia. During this period, the College of Medicine of Paris-Descartes University was relocated to Saint-Quentin-en-Yvelines and renamed "Paris-Île-de-France-Ouest" (PIFO). It is part of the UVSQ today. Increasing tertiary enrollment in France from 1997 to 2002 increased enrollment at UVSQ.

=== 2002 to present ===
In 2002, Sylvie Faucheux became the president of the university. The university applied the réforme LMD to its courses in 2004. The CFA d'Alembert was created at Guyancourt in 2006. In 2007, Unité de formation et de recherche médicale Paris Île-de-France Ouest (PIFO) moved to Saint-Quentin-en-Yvelines, and UniverSud Paris was established, with Paris-Sud 11 University, École Normale Supérieure de Cachan, and UVSQ as members, among others. In 2010, the humanities and social sciences college of UVSQ was split into four: the institut des études culturelles (cultural studies institute), institut supérieur de management (management institute), institut de langues et études internationales (languages and international studies institute), and social sciences research institute. The university expanded to develop the plateau de Saclay (in English European Silicon Valley), an area with world-class universities and research centers. As a founding member of UniverSud Paris, UVSQ supported scientific cooperation and the Paris-Saclay research-intensive cluster. A partnership with Cergy-Pontoise University was considered in 2011, and Université du grand ouest parisien was created in February 2012. An Institut d'études politiques commons for both universities is being studied.

=== Students' profile and demographic changes ===
This table shows the changes in student population, from 1993 to 2013. The number of students enrolled has more than doubled over the past ten years.

1993	1995	1998	1999	2000	2001	2002	2003	2004	2005	2006	2007	2008	2009	2010	2011	2012	2013
7,209	9,322	10,029	10,200	10,579	10,719	12,769	13,295	14,226	14,765	14,450	13,992	13,654	14,623	15,142	15,420	16,126	16,925

In 2013-2014, the UVSQ welcomed approximately 9,600 undergraduate, 6,600 graduate and 700 post-graduate students.

The most popular degree courses are law, economics, and management, with almost 6,200 students representing 37% of total enrollment in 2013, followed by science and engineering school (31%).

Overall, more than half of the undergraduate students enrolled every year are female (60%), except for first-year students at Mantes and Vélizy IUT (University Institute of Technology), two-thirds of whom are male.

The social backgrounds of students are on average, more advantageous than the students matriculated in French public universities. Approximately 50% of first-year students come from business and professional families, and globally about four out of five students belong to wealthy and cultivated social classes. The percentage of students coming from low-income families increased from 14% in 1992 to 20-23% in 2013, but remains a minority. This rate, which is common to most selective universities, reflects the population of the region where the UVSQ is located. Two thirds of first-year students come from the Yvelines department (66%), with a significant concentration around Versailles and Saint-Quentin.

The university welcomes an increasing number of international students; in 2010 there were 2,400 enrolled from 72 different countries, making up 13,3% of UVSQ students. Most were enrolled in Ph.D. programs; 45% of all Ph.D. students were from other countries.

== Buildings and sites ==
=== Campus ===
The university is primarily located on four campuses in Versailles, Saint-Quentin-en-Yvelines, Mantes-en-Yvelines and Vélizy-Villacoublay / Rambouillet, but has eight campuses in total, throughout two departments and seven communes; together these cover 160,000 m^{2}. At the Versailles campus, there is the sciences college and ISTY, the computer science college. At the campus of Saint-Quentin-en-Yvelines, there are the disciplines of law and political sciences, social sciences, medical research and the sciences of the universe observatory. Another campus of the sciences college is located at Le Chesnay. Vélizy-Villacoublay, which includes the IUT of Vélizy and Rambouillet, is one of its annexes. The campus of Mantes-la-Jolie houses the IUT of Mantes-en-Yvelines. Mantes-la-ville includes the mechatronics college of ISTY.

=== Other graduate school and institutes ===
The Unité de formation et de recherche médicale Paris Île-de-France Ouest (in English Paris Île-de-France West Medical Research and Training Departement; also called PIFO or Paris Ouest) is a faculty department of UVSQ. PIFO left Paris Descartes University to join UVSQ between 2001 and 2002, and is located in Guyancourt. Associated hospitals include the Raymond Poincaré University Hospital, Ambroise-Paré Hospital, Foch Hospital, André Mignot Hospital, Poissy St-Germain Hospital, Sainte-Périne Hospital and René Huguenin Hospital. Two schools of midwifery are located in the PIFO department.

=== Observatory ===
The observatory, also called OVSQ, supports sustainable development, an important goal for UVSQ. It is located on Saint-Quentin-en-Yvelines campus, and emphasizes observing, teaching, and supporting the environment. OVSQ researches environmental changes, including its sanitary and socioeconomic impacts, and is involved in spatial programs supported by the CNES (French National Center of Spatial Studies) and the ESA (European Spatial Agency). OVSQ supports international projects that monitor the atmosphere, and develops instruments to observe and analyze natural and social phenomena. To prepare future generations in the field of sustainable development, the OVSQ provides an interdisciplinary culture to the students comprising economics, humanities, and environmental studies. In France, OVSQ partners with Fondaterra (European foundation for sustainable territories) and the international industrial professorship, Econoving, to develop sustainable environments and eco-innovations. The OVSQ partners with the Pierre-Simon Laplace Institute, located in Guyancourt. The observatory contributes to climate study, and supports the Intergovernmental Panel on Climate Change (IPCC). The OVSQ allows the university to be an important part of the Climate-Environment-Energy center of the Paris-Saclay Campus. The observatory also contributes to the European community of Knowledge and Innovation dedicated to the Climate (KIC).

=== PhD graduate schools ===
The university has PhD graduate schools that take care of the PhD students and also habilitation. There are five schools and 102 Doctorates have been delivered in 2009.

- The Cultures, Regulations, Institutions and Territories PhD graduate school, which studies various topics specific to social sciences and humanities as well as legal and political sciences.
- The Genome Organizations PhD graduate school (co-accreditation with University of Évry Val d'Essonne), which is interested in biology and genomics in particular, and interfaces with mathematics, computer science, physics and chemistry.
- The Environmental Science in Ile de France PhD graduate school (co-accreditation with Pierre and Marie Curie University and École normale supérieure Paris-Saclay) covers the multidisciplinary fields related to the understanding of the physical, chemical and biological equilibria of the Earth's environment.
- The Science and Technology of Versailles PhD graduate school, which studies chemistry, physics, mathematics, and engineering sciences.
- The public health PhD graduate school (in partnership with Paris-Sud 11 University and Paris Descartes University), which has three laboratories: research centre for epidemiology and population health, health-environment-aging, pharmaco-epidemiology and infectious diseases.

=== Libraries ===
Its main library, inaugurated in June 2002, has an area of 8400 m2 and has over 100,000 books. In 2005, the university inaugurated the library of Saint-Quentin-en-Yvelines with an area of 7500 m2 on three levels and 1,100 reading places. September 2011 saw the commissioning of the new library on the sciences campus, located in Versailles. In total, the university has six academic libraries located, in addition to the campus already mentioned, on those of Vélizy, Boulogne-Billancourt, Rambouillet and Mantes, consisting of about 200,000 books, 5,000 digital books and 26,000 magazines and newspapers.

== Administration and organization ==
=== Governance ===
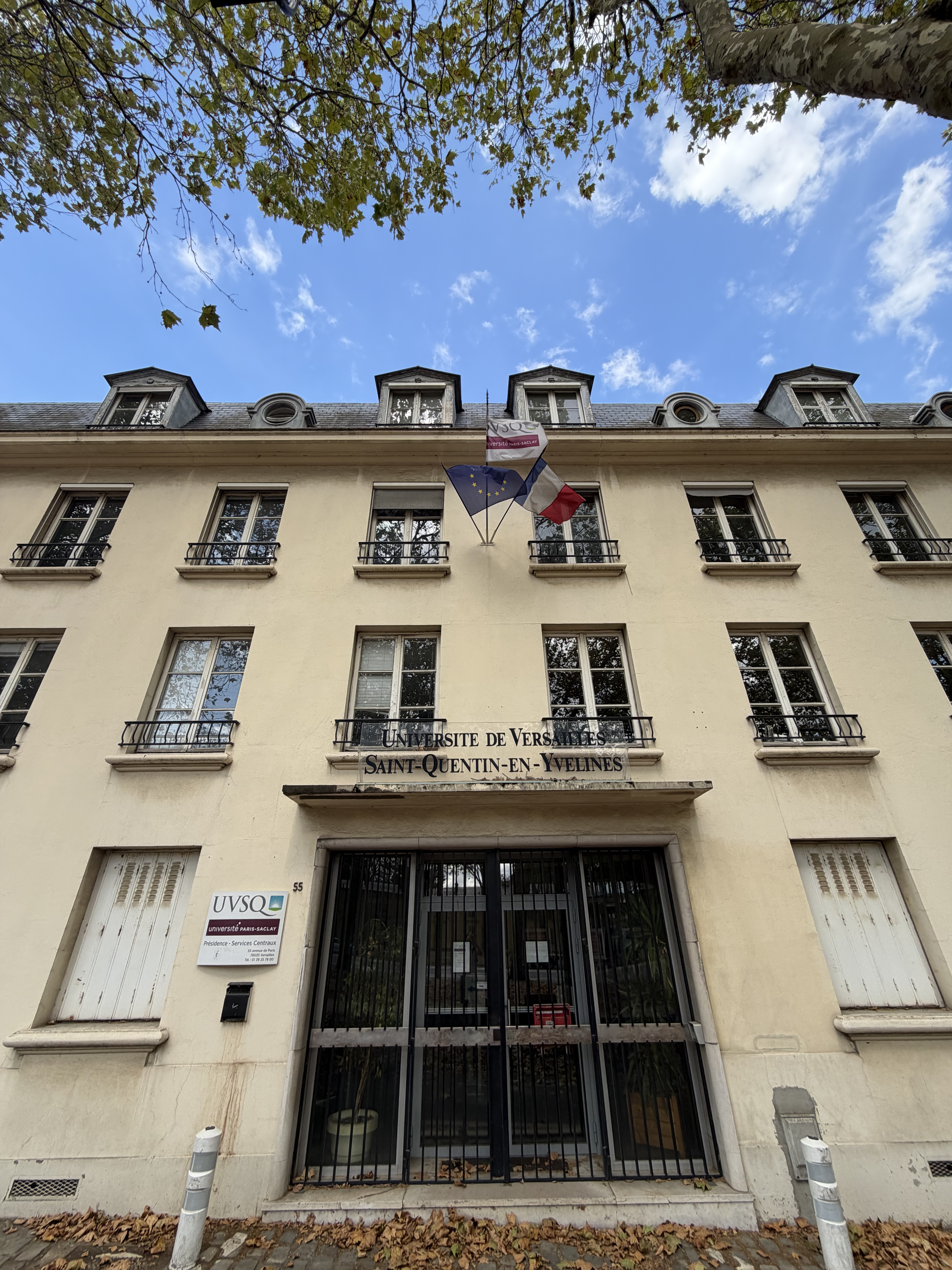
Headquarters in Versailles

Like all the établissement public à caractère scientifique, culturel et professionnel, the university is managed by a president elected by a board of directors, who is a member of the three councils of the university. Staff representatives (including academics) and external representatives on the boards of the university have a term of four years, and student members are elected for two years.

- The board of directors, which has 30 members, determines the policy of the institution, and is responsible for its budget, jobs repartition, and the approval of agreements and conventions.
- The academic and university life council, which has 40 members, is responsible for initial training and continuing education, and helps the board of directors by asking for the accreditation of new courses.
- The scientific council, which has 40 members, is responsible for research activities and development, and gives its opinion on changing Ph.D. courses.

=== Presidents ===
Since its foundation in 1991, there have been six presidents at Versailles Saint-Quentin-en-Yvelines University.

Michel Garnier was the first President of UVSQ from 1991 to 1997. He is an alumnus of the Ecole Normale Supérieure, professor of geophysics, electronics and signal processing. As President of Pierre and Marie Curie University, he created at first an office in Versailles in 1987 called the Faculty of Science. He was then president of UVSQ from 1991 to 1997.

Dominique Gentile served as President of UVSQ from 1997 to 2002. University professor and qualified teacher of physical sciences, he began his career by working successively in the laboratory of fluid mechanics, then in the laboratory of physical mechanics. First professor and then vice-president, he became president of UVSQ in 1997. In 2003 he was director of L’Institut National des Sciences et Techniques Nucléaires. In 2008, he was director of l’Institut des sciences et techniques des Yvelines (Isty), a public engineering school at UVSQ.

Sylvie Faucheux is a French professor who served as the third president of Versailles Saint-Quentin-en-Yvelines University, from 2002 until 2012. She is an academic, a French politician, and a specialist in environmental economics and sustainable development. In December 2002, she was elected President of UVSQ. She was reelected in 2008 for a four-year term until April 12, 2012. She was director of the Academy of Dijon from October 2012 to February 2014.

Jean-Luc Vayssière, Professor of Biology, was the fourth president of Versailles Saint-Quentin-en-Yvelines University, from 2012 until April 2016. Before being elected president, he was chief of staff at UVSQ between 2004 and 2008. From 2008, he was vice-president of the board of directors.

Didier Guillemot, a doctor, was the fifth president of UVSQ, from May 2016 to September 2017. Before being elected President, he was head of the Biostatistics, Biomathematics, Pharmacoepidemiology and Infectious Diseases Laboratory between 2007 and 2016.

Alain Bui, a doctor, is the sixth and current president of UVSQ, since October 2017. Before being elected President, he was a teacher at the sciences college between 2008 and 2016, and vice president from 2016 to 2017.

=== Finances ===
==== Budget ====
The university had a budget of 166 million euros in 2011, which was a 16% increase from 2010. The university had a budget of 143 million euros in 2010, which was 13.1% higher than that of 2009. The budget for normal operations grew by 29.2% during the period 2007–2010. The amount of investment over the same period was about 3.3 million euros in total.

==== Employment structure except for teachers of hospital department ====
In 2009-2010, according to the official report published in June 2010 by the human resources department of the Ministry of Higher Education and Research, Versailles Saint-Quentin-en-Yvelines University employed 229 non-permanent teachers, which corresponds to 119 Full-time equivalents, which is 20.4% of the total teachers of the university, placing it well above the national average of 15.5%. The total number of permanent teachers is 464, including 121 university professors, 250 docents or assistants, and 93 secondary school teachers.

=== Versailles University foundation ===
The UVSQ Foundation is intended to help UVSQ in Yvelines. Issues in society, the scientific higher education, and scientific research evolve from a very competitive environment. In the Yvelines, UVSQ plays a vital role in high-quality education, and participates actively in the construction of the University Paris-Saclay, in close collaboration with Grandes Ecoles (HEC, Polytechnique, Supélec, etc.), Université Paris Sud and research organizations, including CNRS, CEA, INSERM, and INRA. The mission of the UVSQ Foundation is to facilitate this evolution. The UVSQ Foundation offers training programs, research, and support to its sponsors with projects relating to social responsibility.

The UVSQ foundation was created in May 2010 by nine founding members: the university, technical center for mechanical industries, Graduate school of engineering in electrical engineering, Graduate school of aeronautical technology and automotive, IFP Energies Nouvelles, the National research institute for transport and safety, and PSA Peugeot Citroën companies, Renault, Valeo and Safran group. Its projects include a young talent UVSQ scholarship, development of the university library holdings, Equal Opportunities Program, business researcher club, and thesis prize.

== Rankings ==
University rankings

Global – Overall
- ARWU World: 401-500 (2019)
- CWTS World: 883 (2019)

Sources	Ranking
CWUR	310
THE	301-350
THE (Young University Rankings)	42
Shanghai Ranking	401-500
QS (medicine)	451-500

== Academic profile ==
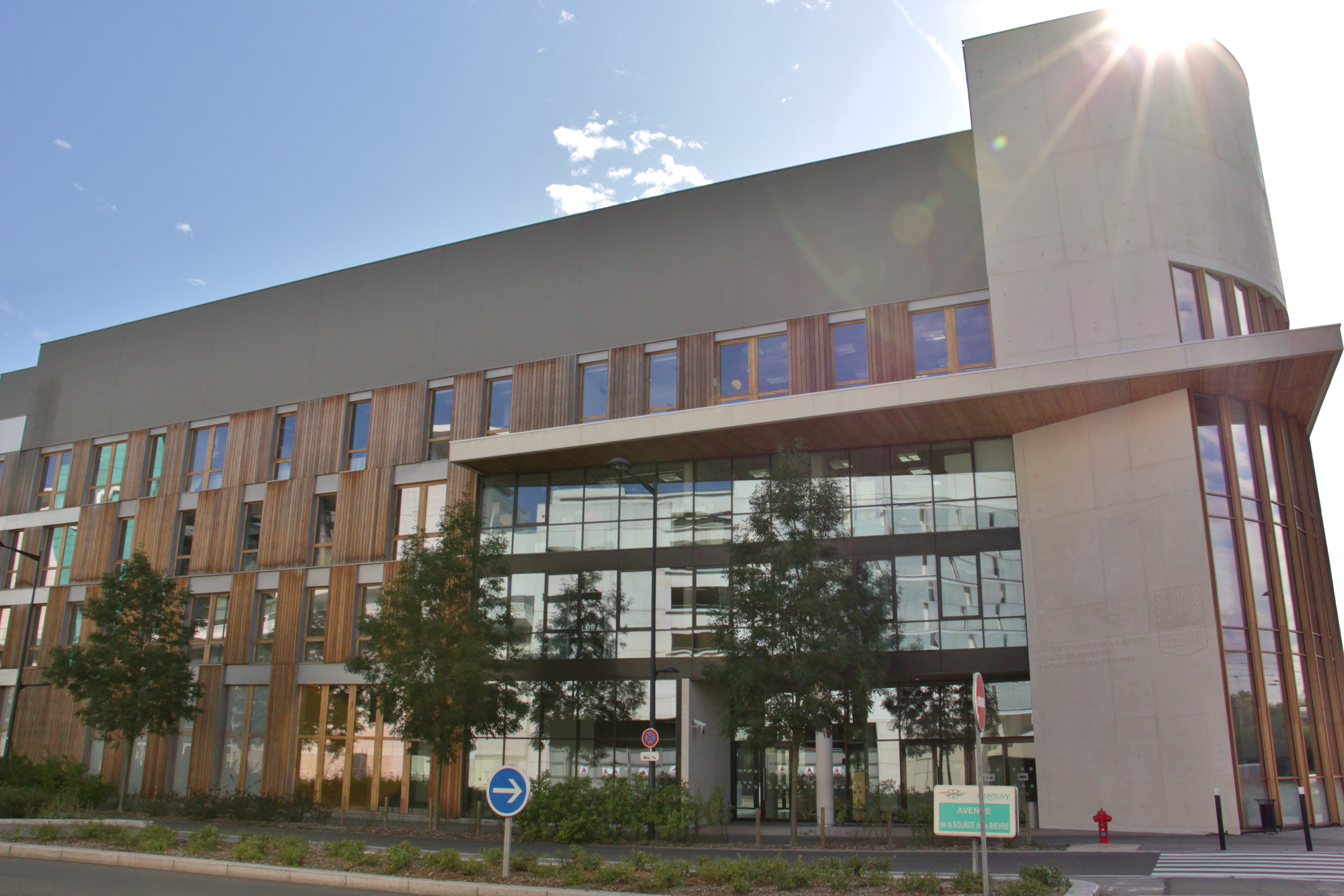
UFR des sciences de la santé Simone Veil

Versailles Saint-Quentin-en-Yvelines University is divided into ten components. There are six faculties, two University Institutes of Technology, one School of Engineering and one Observatory.

French name	Translation	Location	Subjects	Number of students
UFR des sciences	Unit of training and research in science	Versailles and Le Chesnay	biology, physics, chemistry, mathematics, computer science	3500
Faculté de droit et de science politique (DSP)	Faculty of Law and Political Science	Saint-Quentin-en-Yvelines	law and political science	3000
UFR des sciences de la santé Simone Veil	Simone Veil Unit for Health Services Training and Research	Saint-Quentin-en-Yvelines	medicine, dentistry, pharmacy, midwife, psychotherapy, occupational therapy, physical therapy, nursing	2500
UFR des sciences sociales	Unit of training and research in social science	Saint-Quentin-en-Yvelines	economy, social and economic administration, geography and sociology	2000
Institut d'études culturelles et internationales (IECI)	Institute of Cultural and International studies	Saint-Quentin-en-Yvelines	history, literature and languages	1600
Institut supérieur de management (ISM)	Higher institute of Management	Saint-Quentin-en-Yvelines	management science, information science, communication and educational science	1400
IUT de Vélizy - Rambouillet	University Institute of Technology of Vélizy and Rambouillet	Vélizy-Villacoublay and Rambouillet	computer science, electric systems, telecommunication, networks, multimedia	1300
IUT de Mantes en Yvelines	University Institute of Technology of Mantes en Yvelines	Mantes-la-Jolie	civil, industrial, mechanical, computer and mechatronics engineering, management, business, security and natural environment	700
Institut des sciences et techniques des Yvelines (ISTY)	Yvelines Institute of sciences and technique	Vélizy-Villacoublay and Mantes-la-Ville	computer engineering and mechatronics engineering	180
Observatoire de Versailles Saint-Quentin-en-Yvelines (OVSQ)	Versailles Saint-Quentin-en-Yvelines Observatory	Saint-Quentin-en-Yvelines	earth science, astronomy, natural environment, sustainable development, management, system science and social science	

Versailles Saint-Quentin-en-Yvelines University is also managing three schools in partnership with other institutions.

French name	Translation	Location	Subjects	Number of students	Partners
École supérieure du professorat et de l'éducation de l'académie de Versailles	Higher school of teaching and education of Versailles academy	Versailles and Saint-Quentin-en-Yvelines	education	5000	Cergy-Pontoise University, University of Évry Val d'Essonne, Paris West University Nanterre La Défense, University of Paris-Sud, Institut national supérieur de formation et de recherche pour l’éducation des jeunes handicapés et les enseignements adaptés, Académie de Versailles
CFA d'Alembert	d'Alembert Training centre for apprentices	Saint-Quentin-en-Yvelines	health, natural environment, civil engineering, chemistry, real estate public law, communication, risk management	300	Versailles-Val-d'Oise-Yvelines Chamber of Commerce
Sciences Po Saint-Germain-en-Laye	Political Science Saint-Germain-en-Laye	Saint-Germain-en-Laye	political science, public law, history, economy sociology	82	Cergy-Pontoise University

=== Courses ===
In 2012, Versailles Saint-Quentin-en-Yvelines University offers 50 Bachelor's degree, 53 diplôme universitaire (university degree), 10 E-learning courses, 95 Master's degree, 13 diplôme universitaire de technologie (university diploma in Technology), 2 Diplôme d'Ingénieur, 1 Doctor of Medicine degree, 1 Midwifery degree and 2 diplôme d'accès aux études universitaires (access to university degree).

In 2012, the Bachelor's degree is issued in four areas: arts-humanities-languages, law-economy-management, humanities and social sciences, and science-technology-health. In 2012, the Master's degree is issued in five areas: arts-humanities-languages, law-economy-management, humanities and social sciences, environmental science-territory and economics, and science-technology-health.

=== Research ===
Research activities at the university are done in 35 laboratories. Twelve of them are affiliated with the French National Centre for Scientific Research. It has six departments and a total of nearly 950 researchers and 715 PhD students.

- The Chemistry, Physics, Materials, Renewable Energy Department, center for the study of materials and solids hosted in 2013 the Institut de la fiabilité des matériaux pour la mécatronique et les systèmes complexes (Institute of materials reliability for complex systems and mechatronics).
- The Environment and Sustainable Development department covers the sciences, humanities, economics, and medicine.
- The Mathematics, Computer Science, Engineering Sciences department examines two themes: mathematics and computer and systems engineering.
- The Biology and Health department includes about 300 researchers and 1,200 medical students. Research includes biology, medicine, epidemiology and population health. It is attached to several hospitals, including Ambroise-Paré, Raymond Poincaré, Sainte-Périne, and Foch.
- The Cultures, Humanities and Sciences department has three main areas of research and training: languages and civilizations, culture and business, and social sciences.
- The Institutions and Organizations department focuses on management science, law and political science.

The Institut Pierre-Simon Laplace (Pierre-Simon Laplace Institut), a research institute in global environmental sciences, located at Guyancourt, has six laboratories, three of which are under partial guardianship of UVSQ: terrestrial and planetary study center, aeronomy department, and laboratoire des Sciences du Climat et de l'Environnement (Climate science and environment laboratory).

The aeronomy department and a part of the terrestrial and planetary study center merged on 1 January 2009 into the laboratoire atmosphères, milieux et observations spatiales (LATMOS, atmospheres, environments and space observations laboratory), and was placed under the supervision of UVSQ.

=== Teachers and former teachers ===
Several sociologists teach or have taught at the university, including Roland Guillon, known for his work on the problem of employment and capital; Laurent Mucchielli, specialist in criminology including issues of crime and violence of immigrant populations; Philippe Robert, specialized in the study of delinquency and deviance; and Étienne Anheim, Didier Demazière and Claude Dubar.

UVSQ also counts among its current or former teachers historians like Bernard Cottret, honorary member of the Institut Universitaire de France; Christian Delporte, specialist in political and cultural history of the 20th-century of France; Bruno Laurioux, French Middle Ages historian; Jean-Yves Mollier and Loïc Vadelorge, both specialized in contemporary history.

In science, people like the creator of the ext2 file system Rémy Card, the docent in practice and theory of photography Fabien Danesi, the deputy director of the École Normale Supérieure Jean-Charles Darmon or the chemist and member of the French Academy of Sciences Gérard Férey teach or have taught at the university.

Valérie-Laure Bénabou, teacher of private law, is also on the faculty. And among tutor there is Pierre-Hugues Barré.

=== Doctors honoris causa ===
During the honorary degree graduation ceremony on 18 October 2011 at the Versailles Orangerie, Sylvie Faucheux, who was President of the university, awards, in the presence of Alain Boissinot, six personalities: Andrew Abbott (sociology teacher at the University of Chicago), George Bermann (international law teacher at Columbia University), Amos Gitai (director and filmmaker Israeli), Robin Hartshorne (mathematics teacher at the University of California), Günther Lottes (history teacher at the University of Potsdam) and Seiji Miyashita (physics teacher at the University of Tokyo).

=== External image ===
The university has a logo showing a white sunrise on a green earth referring to the sustainable development, a major theme of the university. The diary is named T'DACtu and is published every two months. It is for partners of the university, and also for students and staff. A movie diary called UVSQ & Vous is also available each month. The university is the initiator of the European project Europolytec, whose purpose is to design a website dedicated to careers in computer science and mechatronics.

== Student life ==
=== Student services ===
==== Direction de la Vie Étudiante ====
It advises and supports new foreign students, helps students find housing, and hosts students' initiatives, like culture service, sports service, and associations service. The DVE is also responsible for managing spaces where students eat lunch, take breaks, and work. These spaces are located on the first floor of Buffon building at Versailles campus and at Vauban building on the Saint Quentin en Yvelines campus. The DVE provides students discounts for cultural events. There is a cultural program in the Yvelines each semester and cinemas, theatres, and concerts. In Guyancourt, Versailles and Vélizy campuses, students have access to 20 sports activities.

==== CROUS ====
The CROUS (Centres Régionaux des Oeuvres Universitaires et Scolaires) is a service to improve student life. Every student can access its services. CROUS can help students find accommodation closer to their universities. In 2011, more than 8,500 students were housed in 25 residences managed by the CROUS. The CROUS awards scholarships to students, and has caseworkers who help students. On campus, there are restaurants managed by the CROUS, where students have meals at reduced prices. The CROUS provides free job or internship advertisements for students.

==== Financial help ====
Students can apply between 15 January and 30 April to receive financial aid for the next school year. Criteria include household income, number of dependent children, and distance from campus. There is aid for most qualifying applicants in preparing to take competitive exam to work on public services. Students can apply for bank loans guaranteed by the French state, and do not need guarantees.

=== Student associations ===
Approximately 30 associations offer students activities in science, social sciences and humanities, law, medicine, humanitarian-social-environment, handicap, international, communication, reflexion, student involvement and mechatronics. It is easy to join in or to create an association. Being in an association gives the students the opportunity to imagine and develop specific unprofitable projects. Associations can present these projects and receive a grant from the FSDIE commission (Solidarity and Development Fundings for Student Initiatives). This funding partly is from the registration fees from the students each year. This commission gathers three to four times a year (September, November, March and June) and votes to award grants to projects. Other financial partners of the university can contribute to help the associations finance projects. In order to give the students a place to gather and elaborate projects or to entertain, a student house opened in 2013 on the Versailles campus. It was designed by architect Fabienne Bulle, and has an area of 1,730 m^{2}. This building accommodates local trade and cultural activities, a multipurpose room, an art room, service areas, cafeteria, and associations offices.

=== International relations ===
From the beginning, the university has developed international networks such as Erasmus, the Conférence des recteurs et des principaux des universités du Québec (CREPUQ), or other partnerships with universities abroad. The number of partners was about 230 in 2011. The university welcomed 330 international students in 2010. The number of students from Erasmus from 2003 to 2008 was between 0.41 and 0.67% of the student body, which ranked the university 61 out of 75 in French universities for this programme.

The university welcomes foreign students who want to obtain a French degree. In 2010, there were about 2,400 foreign students, which was 13.3% of the student body. There is a greater percentage in the PhD courses, where almost half of the students (45%) are foreign.

The university is an active member of the University of the Arctic. UArctic is an international cooperative network based in the Circumpolar Arctic region, consisting of more than 200 universities, colleges, and other organizations with an interest in promoting education and research in the Arctic region.

The university also participates in UArctic's mobility program north2north. The aim of that program is to enable students of member institutions to study in different parts of the North.

=== Sociology ===
Of the 14,226 students in 2004, 77.1% were holders of a Baccalauréat général (general Baccalauréat), 12.3% a Baccalauréat technologique (technological Baccalauréat) and 0.7% a Baccalauréat professionnel (vocational Baccalauréat). Furthermore, 12.5% of students received scholarships. Concerning social origins, 49.2% of the students have a favored social origin, 20.2% were from disadvantaged social backgrounds, and 30.6% have an average social origin.

== Notes and references ==
=== Bibliography ===
- (in French) Agence d'évaluation de la recherche et de l'enseignement supérieur, Rapport d'évaluation de l'université de Versailles-Saint-Quentin-en-Yvelines, January 2010
- (in French) Comité national d'évaluation des établissements publics à caractère scientifique, culturel et professionnel, L'université de Versailles-Saint-Quentin-en-Yvelines, Rapport d'évaluation , December 2006
