= Universités nouvelles =

Universities in France

Universités nouvelles (French for "new universities") are eight unaffiliated universities in France that were created during the 1990s.

== History ==
In the 1990s, the head of the Ministry of Higher Education and Research, Lionel Jospin, launched the plan université 2000 (university project 2000), with a spatial planning target: at the time French institutions of higher education were having to address an influx of 50,000 to 100,000 additional students per year. It was especially important to relieve pressure on the universities of Paris and Lille.

These new universities were created either from existing out-stations of the older universities, or else by programs specifically planned to establish new ones. The four new universities located in Ile-de-France were created by decree on 22 July 1991, those of Artois and Littoral by decree on 7 November 1991 the one of La Rochelle in 1993, and that of South Brittany in 1995.

The Montesquieu University – Bordeaux IV, created in 1995 by the subdivision of the existing University of Bordeaux I, and the University of Nîmes, created in 2007, are not considered part of this group.

== List of universities ==
=== Close to Paris ===
- Cergy-Pontoise University
- University of Évry Val d'Essonne
- University of Marne la Vallée
- Versailles Saint-Quentin-en-Yvelines University

=== North ===
- Artois University
- University of the Littoral Opal Coast

=== Atlantic ===
- University of La Rochelle
- University of Southern Brittany

== See also ==
- New university
