= Étienne Anheim =

French historian

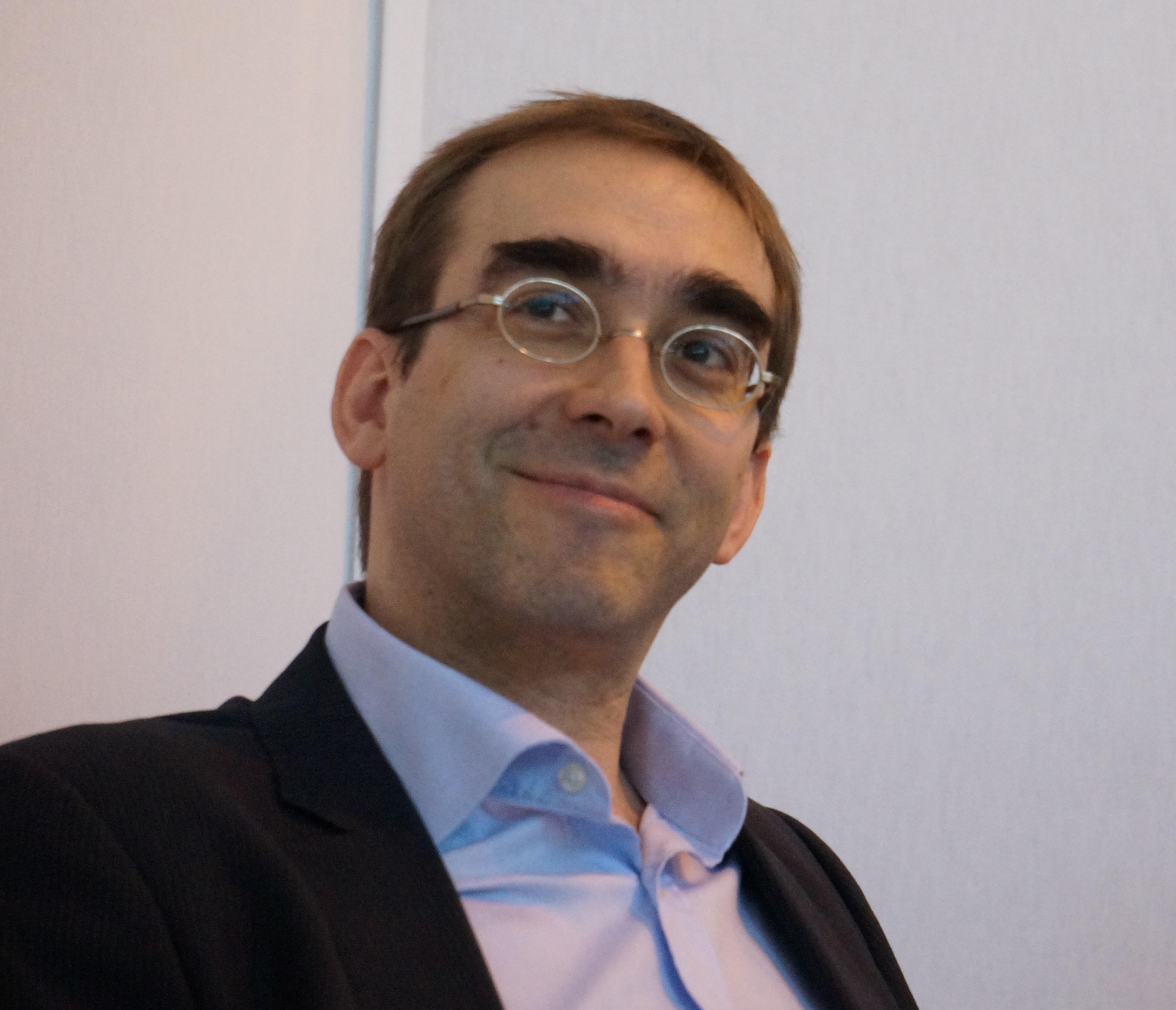
- Born: Anheim
- Education: École Normale Supérieure Lettres et Sciences Humaines
- Occupation: Teacher
- Employer: School for Advanced Studies in the Social Sciences
- Known for: Medievalist historian

Etienne Anheim, a medieval historian, is professor at the School for Advanced Studies in the Social Sciences in Paris.

== Biography ==
Etienne Anheim is a graduate of the 'École Normale Supérieure Lettres et Sciences Humaines, professor of history and former member of the École française de Rome (French School of Rome).

== Academic work ==
He is a member of the editorial boards of Medieval (since 1999), Journal of Synthesis (since 2000), Annals, and History, Social Sciences (since September 2007).

== Bibliography ==
- L'Individu au Moyen Âge individuation et individualisation avant la modernité: Individuation et individualisation avant la modernité (The Individual in the Middle Ages individuation and individualisation before modernity: individualization and individuation before modernity). Brigitte Bedos Rezak, Dominique Iogna-Prat, Étienne Anheim. Aubier, 2005 ISBN 2-7007-2345-7
- Le Diable en procès : démonologie et sorcellerie à la fin du Moyen Âge avec Martine Ostorero (The Devil on Trial: demonology and witchcraft in the late Middle Ages with Martine Ostorero), Presses universitaires de Vincennes ISBN 2-84292-142-9,.
- La Chambre du Cerf. Image, savoir et nature à Avignon au milieu du xive siècle (The House of the Stag. Image, knowledge and nature Avignon in the middle of the fourteenth century), Les savoirs à la cour, Micrologus.
- La Nature, la construction sociale et l’histoire : remarques sur l’œuvre de Ian Hacking (Nature, history and social construction: comments on the work of Ian Hacking), with avec S. Gioanni, Constructivisme vs. naturalisme, under the supervision of C. Lemieux and Michel de Fornel.
- Le savoir et le gouvernement. À propos du livre de S. Kelly (Knowledge and government. About the Book of S. Kelly), The new Solomon. Robert of Naples and the Fourteenth-Century Kingship », Brill, Leiden – Boston, 2003, Médiévales.
- L’artiste et l’office. Financement et statut des producteurs culturels à la cour des papes au xive siècle (The artist and the office. Funding status and cultural producers in the court of the popes in the fourteenth century), Papauté, offices et charges publiques, under the supervision of A. Jamme et O. Poncet, vol. II, École française de Rome.
- Introduzione. Sull’uso e l’abuso delle fonti, with E. Castelli Gattinara
- Marc Bloch : sources orales et épistémologie de l’histoire (Marc Bloch: oral sources and epistemology of history)

== Decorations ==
- Chevalier of the Order of Arts and Letters (2015)
