= Institut d'études politiques de Saint-Germain-en-Laye =

University in Saint-Germain-en-Laye, France

Coordinates: 48°54′03″N 2°04′13″E

Saint-Germain-en-Laye Institute of Political Studies
- Institut d'études politiques de Saint-Germain-en-Laye
- Type: Grande école Institut d'études politiques (public research university Political Science school)
- Established: 2013; 13 years ago
- Affiliations: Conférence des grandes écoles CY Cergy Paris University; Université de Versailles Saint-Quentin-en-Yvelines; Instituts d'études politiques
- Director: Emmanuel Blanchard
- Students: 500+
- Location: Saint-Germain-en-Laye, France
- Language: English-only & French-only instruction
- Nickname: Sciences Po Saint-Germain
- Website: http://www.sciencespo-saintgermainenlaye.fr/

Institut d'études politiques de Saint-Germain-en-Laye (French pronunciation: [ɛ̃stity detyd pɔlitik də sɛ̃ ʒɛʁmɛ̃ ɑ̃ lɛ]) or Sciences Po Saint-Germain ([sjɑ̃s po sɛ̃ ʒɛʁmɛ̃]), is a French political science grande école located in Saint-Germain-en-Laye, close to Paris and is attached to the Versailles Saint-Quentin-en-Yvelines University and the Cergy-Pontoise University. It was established in 2013. Sciences Po Saint-Germain-en-Laye is one of the ten Instituts d'études politiques of France, and a member of the Conférence des Grandes Écoles (CGE).

The Institute has approximately 300 students, admitted after a rigorous selection. Academic studies last five years, at the end of which a student graduates with the Diploma of Sciences Po Saint-Germain-en-Laye (which is equivalent to a master's degree).

Sciences Po Saint-Germain specializes in political sciences. Therefore, the institute offers courses in economics and business, history, law, international relations, social sciences as well as in digital studies.

== Location ==
Sciences Po Saint-Germain-en-Laye is located on a site built at the beginning of the 20th century which, in 1913, hosted the first teacher’s college of the Academy of Versailles. Now listed as historical monuments, the buildings are arranged around an enclosed landscaped garden creating a calm and tranquil setting.

Sciences Po Saint-Germain-en-Laye, like the other Institutes of Political Studies in France, is one of the most selective French schools. Students wishing to attend Sciences Po Saint-Germain have to pass highly selective and competitive entrance exams composed of a general knowledge test, a history test, and a language test. These exams are co-organized with six other institutes, respectively located in Aix-en-Provence, Lille, Rennes, Lyon, Strasbourg, and Toulouse. Selected students can then decide in which of these seven institutes they will enroll. The selection rate of Sciences Po Saint-Germain-en-Laye has remained around 10% and below since its creation in 2013 (with 120 places available in the first year and 65 in the fourth as of 2026)

== Overview ==
Sciences Po institutes are Grandes Écoles, French institution of higher education that is separate from, but parallel and connected to the main framework of the French public university system. Similar to the Ivy League in the United States, Oxbridge in the UK, and C9 League in China, Grandes Écoles are elite academic institutions that admit students through an extremely competitive process. The selection rates at these schools are frequently around and below 10%. Alumni go on to occupy elite positions in government, administration, and corporate firms in France.

Although these institutes are more expensive than public universities in France, Grandes Écoles typically have much smaller class sizes and student bodies, and many of their programs are taught in English. International internships, study abroad opportunities, and close ties with government and the corporate world are hallmarks of the Grandes Écoles. Many of the top ranked schools in Europe are members of the Conférence des Grandes Écoles (CGE), as are the Sciences Po institutes.

The institute is modeled on the former École Libre des Sciences Politiques, and as such, Sciences Po specializes in Political Science, but uses an interdisciplinary approach to education that provides students with a broad high-level grounding in History, Law, Economics, Sociology as well as Political Science and International Relations. The academic course lasts 5 years and consists of a three-year undergraduate programme and a two-year graduate programme. The third year of the curriculum is a year of mobility abroad, and students can spend two semesters in a foreign university, one semester in a university and one semester internship or they also have the opportunity to spend two semesters as a trainee. From the 2026–2027 academic year onward, the fourth year is undertaken as part of a dual-degree programme with a first-year master's degree (Master 1) at one of three partner universities: Political Science at Paris-Saclay University, co-accredited by CY Cergy Paris Université which includes four specializations: (Public and Territorial Affairs, Arts and Cultural Policies, International and European Policies, as well as Intelligence and Security); Law at the University of Versailles Saint-Quentin-en-Yvelines (UVSQ); or Economics at CY Cergy Paris Université (CYU). Upon completion of the program, students are awarded both the Sciences Po Saint-Germain-en-Laye diploma, equivalent to a master's degree, and a master's degree from the relevant partner university mentioned above. Degrees from Sciences Po are accredited by the Conférence des Grandes Écoles and awarded by the Ministry of National Education (France) (French: Le Ministère de L'Éducation nationale).

== History ==
=== Directors ===
- 2013-2024: Céline Braconnier
- Since 2024 : Emmanuel Blanchard
