= University technical institute (France) =

Type of post-secondary vocational college in France

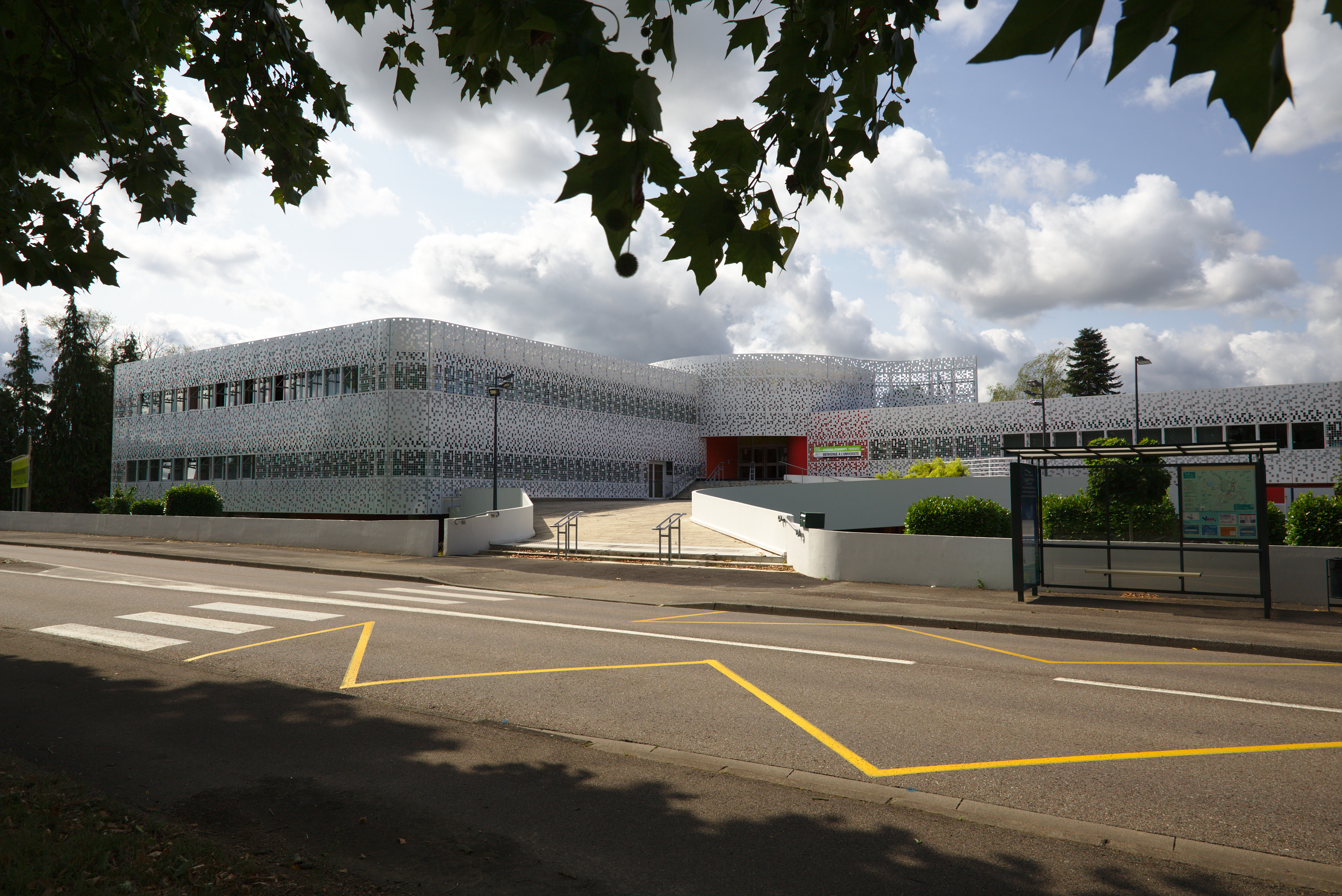
A University Technical Institute (IUT) in Vesoul, France.

A university technical institute or IUT (French: instituts universitaires de technologie) is a type of post-secondary vocational college in France, similar to the yrkeshögskolan in Sweden.

This is a type of educational institution that offers post-secondary study programmes designed to provide higher vocational education or the technical skills needed to perform the tasks of a particular and specific job. While the academic level is the same as a bachelor's degree (licence), the programme is different, with much more practical work, projects, apprenticeships and work placements, unlike a traditional bachelor's degree.

Its main diploma, the bachelor universitaire de technologie (BUT) (in English "University Bachelor of Technical Studies"), is very similar to a Bachelor of Applied Science.

The model of a university technical institute in France is similar to that of a university technical college in England or a post-secondary vocational school. Unlike them, a French university technical institute is attached to a university and offers programmes ranging from associate degrees to bachelor's degrees. University technical institutes also offer licences professionnelles and masters.

== Description ==
The university technical institutes (Institut Universitaire de Technologie, IUT) were created in 1966. There are 108 IUTs which are attached to 80 universities including the ones in the French Overseas Territories and Departments.

Prior to 2021, a university technical institute (IUT) was known for offering post-secondary studies lasting two to three years. It primarily offered a diploma (the Diplôme universitaire de technologie or DUT) with an academic level above that of a high school diploma but below that of a bachelor's degree. After finishing their DUT, students had the option to work, do a one-year professional bachelor's degree called licence professionnelle (a course also offered by IUTs), or further their studies. Since 2021, university technical institutes have been aligned with the bachelor's master's doctorate system, with the degree being extended from two to three years and renamed "University Bachelor of Technical Studies" (bachelor universitaire de technologie - BUT). University technical institutes also offer masters.

The university technical institute primarily allow the preparation of a three-year career-focused vocational undergraduate diploma called Bachelor universitaire de technologie (BUT), (in English: "Bachelor of Technical Studies", the IUT diploma. They are similar to associate degrees or the BTEC Higher Nationals Diploma. After the three-year IUT diploma, students are expected to enter the job market. Some choose to continue their studies on a post-graduate course.

In France, university technical institutes bring university education to small cities where no university exists. They are systematically attached to a large university.

== List of university technical institutes ==
Region	University	IUTs	
Grand Est	University of Upper Alsace	IUT de Colmar IUT de Mulhouse	
Grand Est	University of Strasbourg	IUT d'Haguenau IUT d'Illkirch IUT de Schiltigheim	
Grand Est	University of Reims	IUT de Reims IUT de Troyes	
Grand Est	University of Lorraine	IUT de Metz IUT Moselle-Est IUT de Thionville-Yutz	
Grand Est	University of Lorraine	IUT Henri Poincaré de Longwy IUT de Nancy-Brabois IUT de Saint-Dié	
Grand Est	University of Lorraine	IUT d'Epinal-Hubert Curien IUT de Nancy-Charlemagne	
Nouvelle-Aquitaine	University of Bordeaux	IUT Bordeaux-I	
Nouvelle-Aquitaine	University of Bordeaux	IUT Bordeaux-III	
Nouvelle-Aquitaine	Bordeaux-Montaigne University	IUT Bordeaux-IV IUT de Périgueux	
Nouvelle-Aquitaine	University of Pau and the Adour Region	IUT de Bayonne IUT des Pays de l'Adour	
Nouvelle-Aquitaine	University of Limoges	IUT du Limousin	
Nouvelle-Aquitaine	University of La Rochelle	Institut universitaire de technologie de La Rochelle	
Nouvelle-Aquitaine	University of Poitiers	Institut universitaire de technologie d'Angoulême Institut universitaire de technologie de Poitiers	
Auvergne-Rhône-Alpes	Clermont Auvergne University	IUT de Clermont-Ferrand	
Auvergne-Rhône-Alpes	Clermont Auvergne University	IUT de Montluçon	
Auvergne-Rhône-Alpes	University of Savoie-Mont Blanc	Institut universitaire de technologie d'Annecy Institut universitaire de technologie de Chambéry	
Auvergne-Rhône-Alpes	Grenoble Alpes University	Institut universitaire de technologie A de l'université Grenoble-I	
Auvergne-Rhône-Alpes	Grenoble Alpes University	Institut universitaire de technologie B de l'université Grenoble-II Institut universitaire de technologie de Valence	
Auvergne-Rhône-Alpes	Claude Bernard University – Lyon 1	Institut universitaire de technologie Lyon-I de l'université de Lyon	
Auvergne-Rhône-Alpes	Lumière University – Lyon 2	Institut universitaire de technologie de Bron	
Auvergne-Rhône-Alpes	Jean Moulin University – Lyon 3	Institut universitaire de technologie de Lyon-III	
Auvergne-Rhône-Alpes	Jean Monnet University	Institut universitaire de technologie de Roanne Institut universitaire de technologie de Saint-Etienne Institut universitaire de technologie de Saint-Etienne ATII promotion	
Normandy	University of Caen Normandy	IUT d'Alençon IUT de Caen IUT de Cherbourg	
Normandy	University of Le Havre	IUT du Havre	
Normandy	University of Rouen	IUT d'Évreux IUT de Rouen	
Bourgogne-Franche-Comté	University of Burgundy	IUT de Chalon-sur-Saône IUT de Dijon IUT du Creusot	
Bourgogne-Franche-Comté	University of Franche-Comté	IUT de Belfort IUT de Besançon	
Brittany	University of Western Brittany	IUT de Brest IUT de Quimper	
Brittany	University of Southern Brittany	IUT de Lorient-Pontivy IUT de Vannes	
Brittany	University of Rennes	IUT de Lannion IUT de Rennes IUT de Saint-Brieuc IUT de Saint-Malo	
Centre-Val de Loire	University of Orléans	IUT de Bourges IUT de Chartres IUT de l'Indre IUT de technologie d'Orléans	
Centre-Val de Loire	University of Tours	IUT de Blois IUT de Tours	
Corsica	Università di Corsica	IUT de Corte	
Île-de-France	CY Cergy Paris University	IUT de Cergy-Pontoise	
Île-de-France	University of Évry Val d'Essonne	IUT d'Évry	
Île-de-France	University of Évry Val d'Essonne	IUT d'Évry in Juvisy-sur-Orge	
Île-de-France	University of Évry Val d'Essonne	IUT d'Évry in Brétigny-sur-Orge	
Île-de-France	Gustave Eiffel University	IUT de Marne-la-Vallée	
Île-de-France	Paris Cité University	IUT de Paris – Rives de Seine	
Île-de-France	Paris Cité University	IUT de Paris – Pajol	
Île-de-France	University of Vincennes Saint-Denis	IUT de Montreuil IUT de Tremblay-en-France	
Île-de-France	Paris-Nanterre University	IUT de Ville-d'Avray	
Île-de-France	Paris-Saclay University	IUT de Cachan IUT d'Orsay IUT de Sceaux	
Île-de-France	Paris-Est Créteil University	IUT de Créteil IUT de Seine-et-Marne Sud	
Île-de-France	Sorbonne Paris Nord University	IUT de Bobigny IUT de Saint-Denis IUT de Villetaneuse	
Île-de-France	University of Versailles Saint-Quentin-en-Yvelines	IUT de Mantes IUT de Vélizy	
Occitanie	University of Montpellier	IUT de Béziers IUT de Montpellier IUT de Nîmes	
Occitanie	University of Perpignan	IUT de Perpignan	
Occitanie	University of Toulouse Capitole	IUT de Rodez	
Occitanie	University of Toulouse Jean Jaurès	IUT de Blagnac IUT de Figeac	
Occitanie	Paul Sabatier University	IUT de Castres IUT de Tarbes IUT de Toulouse	
Hauts-de-France	Artois University	IUT de Béthune IUT de Lens	
Hauts-de-France	University of Lille	IUT de Lille	
Hauts-de-France	University of the Littoral Opal Coast	IUT de Calais – Boulogne IUT de Saint-Omer – Dunkerque	
Hauts-de-France	Polytechnic University of Hauts-de-France	Institut universitaire de technologie de Valenciennes	
Hauts-de-France	University of Picardy	Institut universitaire de technologie de l'Aisne Institut universitaire de technologie d'Amiens Institut universitaire de technologie de Beauvais	
Hauts-de-France	Overseas France	University of French Guiana	Institut universitaire de technologie de Kourou
Hauts-de-France	Overseas France	University of Reunion Island	Institut universitaire de technologie de La Réunion
Provence-Alpes-Côte d'Azur	Aix-Marseille University	Institut universitaire de technologie de l'université de Provence	
Provence-Alpes-Côte d'Azur	Aix-Marseille University	Institut universitaire de technologie d'Aix-en-Provence	
Provence-Alpes-Côte d'Azur	Aix-Marseille University	Institut universitaire de technologie de Marseille	
Provence-Alpes-Côte d'Azur	University of Avignon	Institut universitaire de technologie d'Avignon	
Provence-Alpes-Côte d'Azur	French Rivera University	Institut universitaire de technologie de Nice	
Provence-Alpes-Côte d'Azur	University of Toulon	Institut universitaire de technologie de Toulon	
Pays de la Loire	University of Angers	Institut universitaire de technologie d'Angers	
Pays de la Loire	Le Mans University	Institut universitaire de technologie du Mans Institut universitaire de technologie de Laval	
Pays de la Loire	University of Nantes	Institut universitaire de technologie de la Roche-sur-Yon Institut universitaire de technologie de Nantes Institut universitaire de technologie de Saint-Nazaire	
