= Diplôme universitaire =

In France, a diplôme universitaire (DU, in English "university degree") or interuniversitaire (DIU, in English "inter-university degree") is a degree from a French university, a grand établissement or Établissement public à caractère scientifique, culturel et professionnel, or many establishments jointly, as opposed to national diplomas, which are issued on behalf of the Ministry.

== Standard Comparison ==
A diplôme universitaire (DU) is, in France, a university degree. Contrary to the Bachelor, Master and Doctoral degrees, which are national, DU means "University diploma". The degree corresponds to a restricted domain, for temporary or professional purpose. Each university is authorized for specifics DU. Application process, the duration of studies, the evaluation method can be very different depending on the purpose of the diploma. Most of DU, however, attest to a 1 to 3 months training spread over the weekend for 2 or 3 years.

DU are organized by a single university, while DIU combine several universities to organize the same course (which often takes place in different cities).

They do not fit in the Bachelor-Master-PhD diagram and no university may require obtaining a DU "complementary" to validate a state diploma (although in practice this dual training is often recommended). These qualifications are managed in local autonomy, that is to say, out of the overall budget of the Ministry (endowment per student) and their prices are aligned with those of the private sector training. They are particularly numerous in the field of medicine, "alternative medicine", dentistry, pharmacy and psychology. However, at some universities, a specific DU program might be considered equivalent to a Master 1 program when applying for a Master 2 program.

Universities are free to set tuition fees to a DIU, contrary to the cost of national degrees.

== Particular case ==
Some university degrees are known by specific titles, such as LL.M., MBA or MSc. There are no national diplomas, even if their name is reminiscent of the Master.
