= Diplôme d'accès aux études universitaires =

In France, a Diplôme d'accès aux études universitaires (DAEU, in English access to university degree) is a degree from a French university in order to have an equivalence of the Baccalauréat and access to university studies.

== History ==
The current provisions dating from 1994. It was existing before the "special exam to access to higher education" since 1986.

== Goals ==
The main objectives of this qualification are to be able to resume their studies, mainly into a university or to be able to pass administrative competitive examinations.

== Requirements ==
To obtain the diploma, it is necessary to be enrolled in a university for a year of preparation.

Registration is open to candidates :

- who discontinued their initial studies for at least two years;
- satisfying the following conditions:
  - are at least twenty years old on 1 October of the year of issue of the degree and justify at the same date two years of work, full time or part time, giving rise to contributions to social security;
  - are at least twenty-four years old on 1 October of the year of issue of the degree.

Maximum four entries are possible.

== Exam ==
The examination consists of four tests which can be, depending on the option chosen and the material: French, English, Mathematics, History, Geography, Sociology.

- Option A: French, foreign language and two tests chosen by the candidate,
- Option B: French, mathematics and two tests chosen by the candidate.

== Statistics ==
In 2004, this training involved 13 100 people spread to 82% in option A and 18% in option B. In 2003, 4,330 degrees were issued. 37% of students who received a DAEU continue their studies at university or to a similar establishment in the year following graduation.
