= INSEEC School of Business and Economics =

French private business school grande école

Institute of Higher Studies in Economics and Commerce (INSEEC)
- Institut des Hautes Études Economiques et Commerciales (INSEEC)
- Motto in English: Education for Global Citizenship
- Type: Business school, Grande école, Private research university
- Established: 1975
- Parent institution: OMNES Education
- Accreditation: AMBA, Conférence des grandes écoles (CGE), Commission d'évaluation des formations et diplômes de gestion, Répertoire national des certifications professionnelles
- Affiliations: Chapitre des Écoles de Management, AMBA, UGEI, EFMD, AACSB, Répertoire national des certifications professionnelles, Commission d'évaluation des formations et diplômes de gestion.
- Endowment: € 220 millions (2017)
- Chairman: José Milano
- Director: Françoise Gri
- Faculty: Faculty: 345 (amongst which 126 professor / researchers) | 3000 including all academic staff members for the whole OMNES Education
- Students: 5,000 (Grande Ecole) | 35,000 for the whole OMNES Education group (36% of foreign students | 63 nationalities)
- Location: Bordeaux, Paris, Lyon, Chambéry, Monaco, Geneva, London, Chicago: opened in 2011 and closed in 2019, San Francisco, Shanghai, Abidjan; 48.8426°N 2.261°E
- Campus: Urban
- Colors: Grey and yellow
- Website: grandeecole.inseec.com/en/ www.inseec.education

The INSEEC School of Business and Economics (French pronunciation: /ɪnsɛk/; French meaning of the acronym INSEEC: Institut des Hautes Études Economiques et Commerciales; English: Institute of Higher Studies in Economics and Commerce) is a French private business school grande école and a member of the French Conférence des grandes écoles (CGE).

The school has French, European and international campuses in Paris, Bordeaux, Lyon, Chambéry, Marseille, Beaune, London, Monaco, Geneva, Lausanne, Montreux, Madrid, Barcelona, Abidjan and Shanghai as well as San Francisco. It was previously called the INSEEC Business School until its renaming in 2019.

Founded in 1975 by José Soubiran in Bordeaux, the INSEEC School of Business and Economics grew gradually by acquiring other academic institutions in business administration, economics, engineering, design, social and political science in France and abroad.

INSEEC Grande Ecole is the founding school of the French private university INSEEC U now called OMNES Education.

Logo of the OMNES Education institution to which the INSEEC School of Business & Economics belongs.

== History ==
The Grande Ecole INSEEC School of Business & Economics grew at a fast pace, and especially internationally, underpinned by Career Education Corporation until October 24, 2013. From a local School founded and based in Bordeaux, it has developed tiers with the American Education System via its Franco-American Business School: the MBA Institute - American BBA INSEEC Campus in Paris, which prepares French and International Students for an MBA in the United States, enabling them to obtain a diploma at the end, recognised both in Europe and in the US. Strong bounds have been created with several American Universities such as: Emory (Atlanta), Indiana University of Pennsylvania or San Francisco State University allowing students to dive into American Campuses.

- 1975: Founded by José Soubiran, a French businessman born in 1944, Knight of the Legion of Honour (French Order of Merit), founder of the first institute for psycho-motor skills.
- 1976: INSEEC was the first French Business School to sign an agreement with the University of California, Berkeley in 1976.
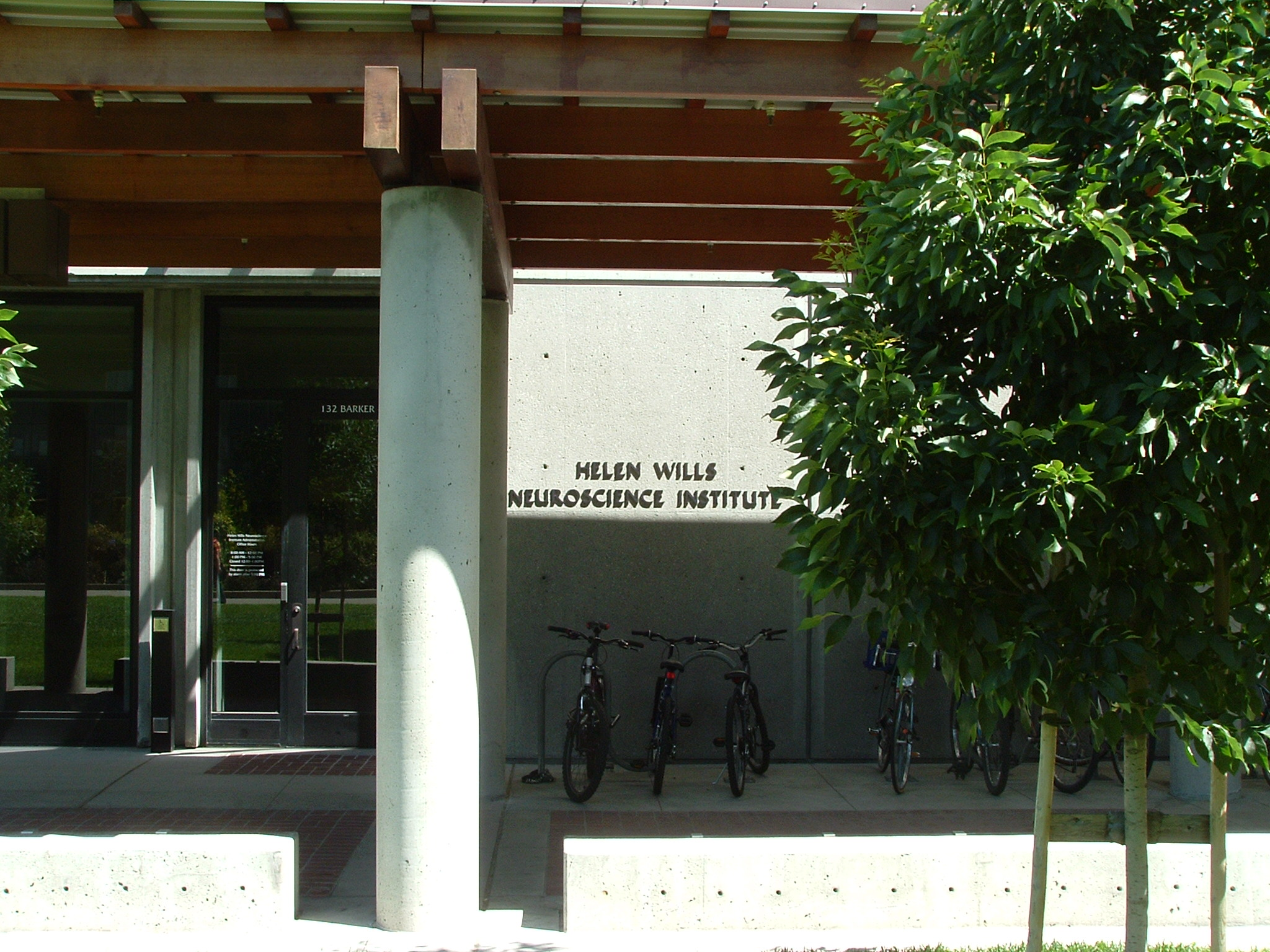
  Helen Wills Neuroscience Institute located within Barker Hall at the University of California, where students from INSEEC are involved as part of the Art + Tech curriculum.
- 1983: Establishment of the School in Paris.
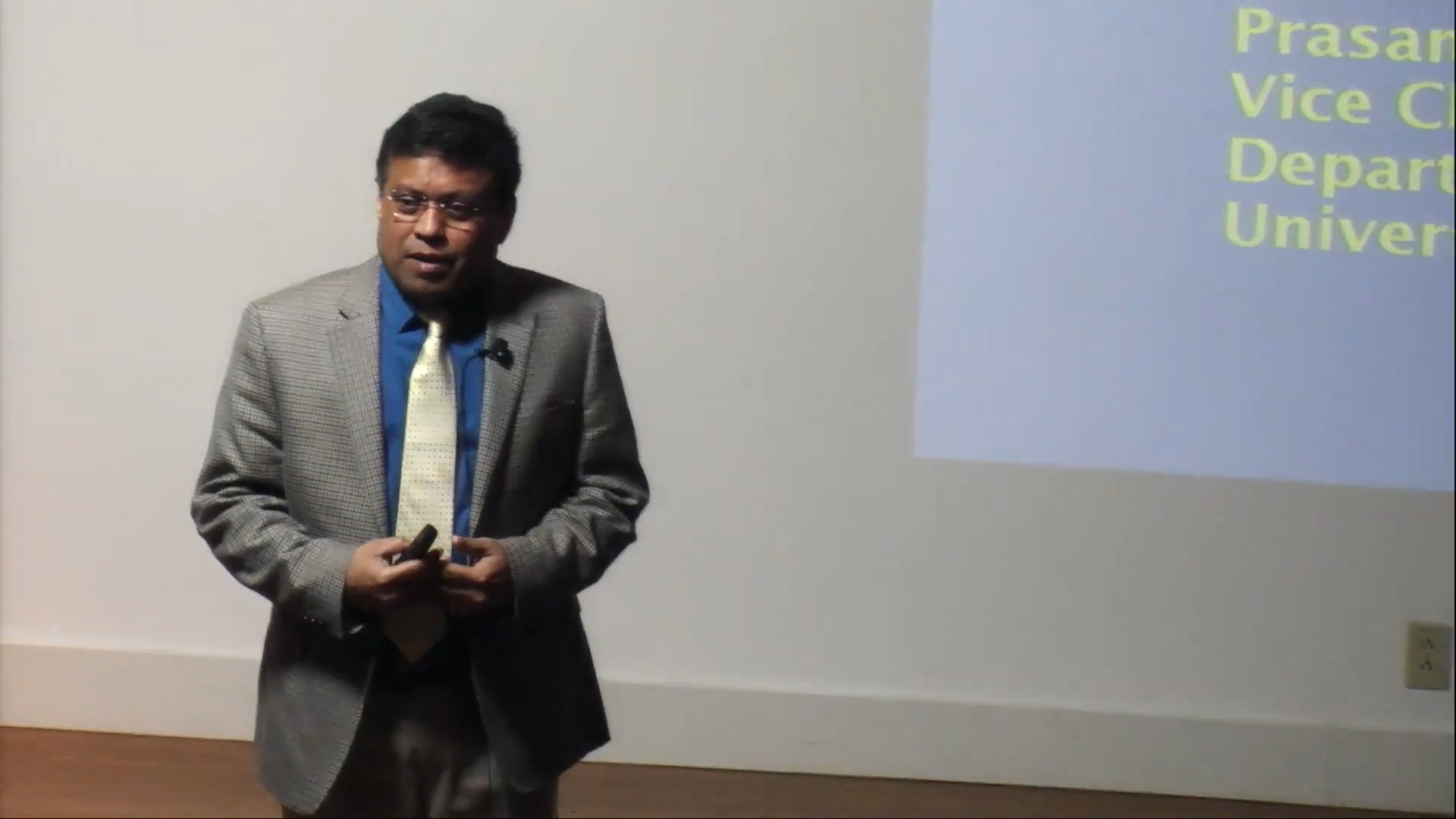
  Example of Citris foundry event: Prasant Mohapatra talks about Impactful Research at UC Davis at a Citris Research Exchange Program held at UC Berkeley in 2019. INSEEC is the first French Grande Ecole to cooperate with the group of Universities: Citris foundry.
- 1988: the ECE (Ecole de Commerce Européenne): the European School of Business was founded in Lyon and Bordeaux.
- 1990: Establishment of a Campus in Lyon.
  European Campuses of INSEEC
- 1994: Acquisition of the MBA Institute, a Franco-American Business School established in Paris since 1982, providing an American education and preparing French students to study in the best MBAs in the USA. The MBA Institute then became the American BBA INSEEC-MBA Institute, whose Director of Program is Robert Bradford, a San Francisco State University alumnus.
- 1996: INSEEC acquired Sup de pub, a former university from Havas EuroRSCG.
- 2003: The Chicago-based corporation Career Education Corporation, the leading American company in education, acquired the INSEEC Group.
- 2008: INSEEC Business School becomes a Grande Ecole, and thus member of the Conférence des Grandes Ecole at the Chapter of Management Schools.
- 2009: INSEEC starts a double-degree agreement with the Marburg University in Germany. INSEEC starts a tripartite agreement with Griffith College and the SRH Hochschule Berlin. The same year, establishment of INSEEC's incubating Junior Enterprise on the Bordeaux campus.
- 2010: The INSEEC Group purchases the International University of Monaco. INSEEC starts a partnership with Arts et Métiers ParisTech (ENSAM Engineering School).
- 2011: INSEEC starts a tripartite agreement with Tsinghua University, Versailles Saint-Quentin-en-Yvelines University
- 2012: The INSEEC Group buys the Consular Business School of Chambéry (ESC Chambéry) to create INSEEC Alpes Savoie Business School, an additional campus in the Alps. The incubant on-campus students' consulting association: INSEEC Conseil becomes officially Junior Enterprise-accredited, after being bestowed this label upon by the French National Confederation of Junior Enterprises.
- 2013: Career Education Corporation cedes its shares of the INSEEC Group. APAX Partners and BPI France acquires the INSEEC Group, making INSEEC's shareholders fully French again.
- 2014: Acquisition of CREA Geneva - Switzerland. Establishment of the Luxury Business Institute (LBI) in Shanghai.
- 2015: The ECE (Ecole de Commerce Européenne): the European School of Business becomes the BBA - INSEEC (BBA as for Business Bachelor), a 4-year American Bachelor curriculum. Establishment the same year of a Strategy Cluster in Lyon, specialised in Strategic Management. Establishment of INSEEC Wines & Spirits Campus in Beaune (Burgundy).
- 2016: Establishment of the Campus in San Francisco. APAX buys Schools from the American group Lauréate International, namely: EBS, ESCE, ECE, IFG and the CEPC.
- 2017: The INSEEC Group is renamed INSEEC U. The Grande Ecole INSEEC Business School becomes INSEEC School of Business and Economics. INSEEC Business School is AMBA-accredited. INSEEC U. acquires HEIP (French: Hautes Etudes Internationales et Politiques, established in 1899 as: Ecole des Hautes Etudes Sociales), a Higher Education Institute specialised in Political Science, Diplomacy and International Relations, with campuses in Paris, London and Lyon. Establishment of a Crea Geneva campus in Lausanne, Switzerland.
- 2018: HEIP (Hautes Etudes Internationales et Politiques - part of INSEEC U. Group) signs an agreement with Macquarie University in Sydney. Start of a cooperation with the European Think-Tank LEAP (French: Laboratoire Européen d'Anticipation Politique, English: European Laboratory of Political Anticipation) established in 1997 as "Europe2020" by Marie-Helene Caillol (the current president of LEAP) and Franck Biancheri, founder of the European student network AEGEE (French: Association des États Generaux de l'Europe).
- 2019: INSEEC U. valued at almost 1 billion Euros and becomes the first French unicorn in higher Education. The CINVEN fund buys INSEEC U. from APAX. Cooperation initiated with the Citris Foundry, an innovation and start-up incubator on the campus of the University of California, Berkeley, with the HAX accelerator founded by the French entrepreneur Cyril Ebersweiler and Sean O'Sullivan, with the American multinational Sales Force, and with the Helen Wills Neuroscience Institute as part of the Art + Tech programme of INSEEC U.
- 2020: INSEEC U. becomes financially the strongest Business School in France.
- 2021: INSEEC U. is renamed as OMNES Education.
- 2022: Acquisition of the EU Business School Group by OMNES Education, with campuses in Barcelona, Geneva (which is now the second campus of OMNES in Geneva), Montreux and Munich. The same year, acquisition of Centro de estudios de innovacion - a School in Marketing and Design in Madrid, Spain.
- 2023: Opening of a new campus in Brittany, in the city of Rennes.
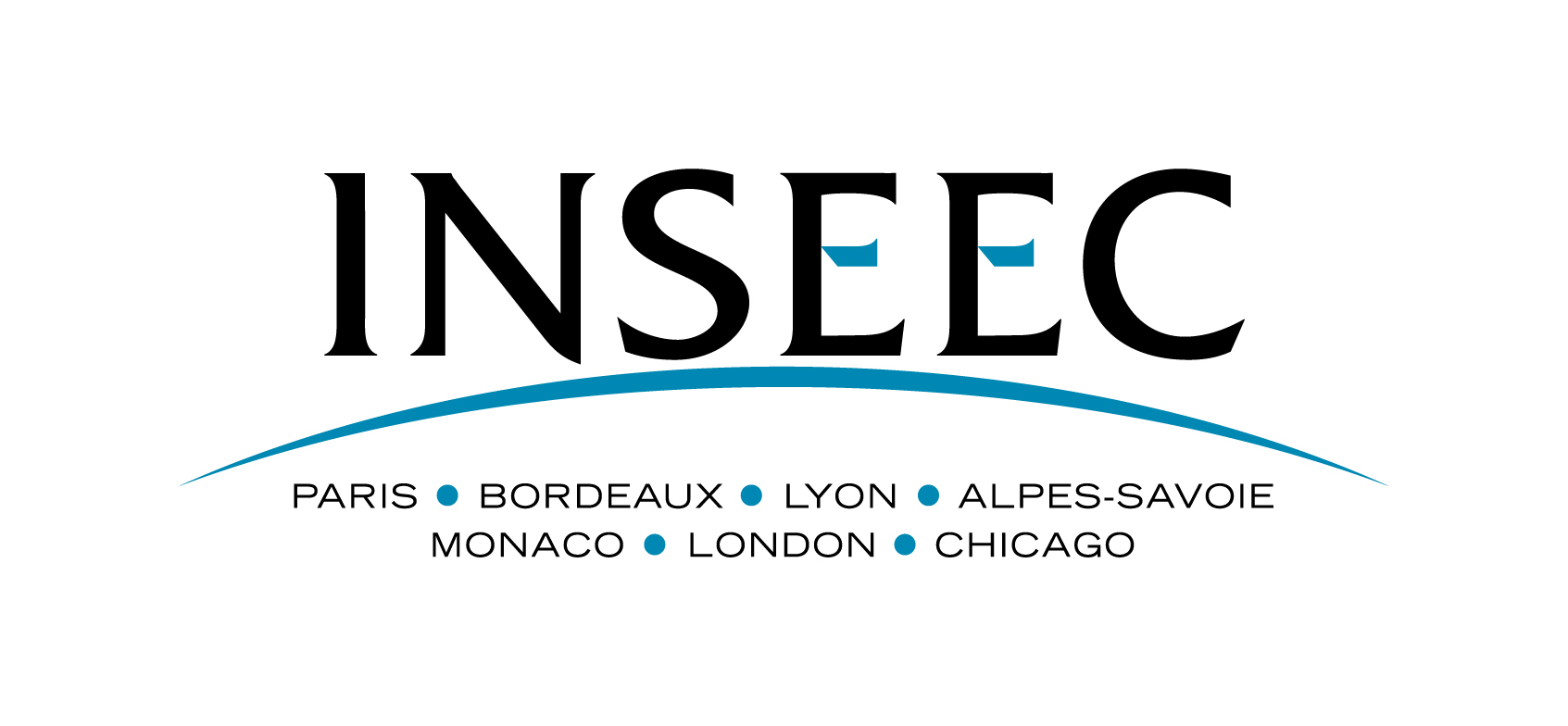
Logo of INSEEC until 2015.

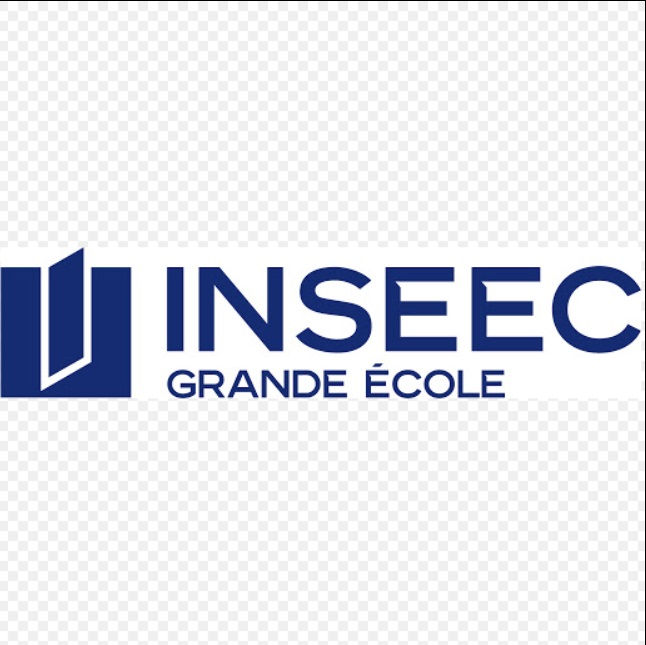
Logo of INSEEC since 2021.

== Values ==
INSEEC's values, like most other French Grande Ecoles, revolve around the humanism of the French Enlightenment era and the School of Thought of French Humanism as well as the French Renaissance. As such, French Grande Ecole Educational Institutions follow principles of universalism, knowledge emancipation and Cartesianism, following the influence of the French Encyclopedists of the 17th century.

This has led to pedagogic influences into INSEEC's Grande Ecole curriculum such as the compulsory "humanist internship", as part of which students have to carry out a work placement in a charity or an association. Other pedagogic unique features of Grande Ecole and INSEEC which are typically French and ensue from the French Enlightenment: the teaching of general culture which represents a third of the first year Grande Ecole curriculum for Freshmen. Double-degrees in law, anthropology, philosophy and humanities in general is also possible via partnerships with Bordeaux University or the UVSQ (Saint-Quentin-en-Yvelines University / University of Versailles / University of Paris Saclay).

== Campuses ==
The INSEEC Business School has campuses in:

- Paris (several campuses)
- Bordeaux (several campuses)
- Lyon
- Chambéry (in the French Alps)
- Beaune (in Burgundy)
- Rennes (Brittany)
- London, United Kingdom
- Monaco, Monaco (French Riviera)
- Geneva, Switzerland (several campuses)
- Lausanne, Switzerland
- Marseille, France
- Montreux, Switzerland
- Munich, Germany
- Madrid, Spain
- Barcelona, Spain
- Shanghai, China
- San Francisco, United States (several campuses)
- Abidjan, Ivory Coast
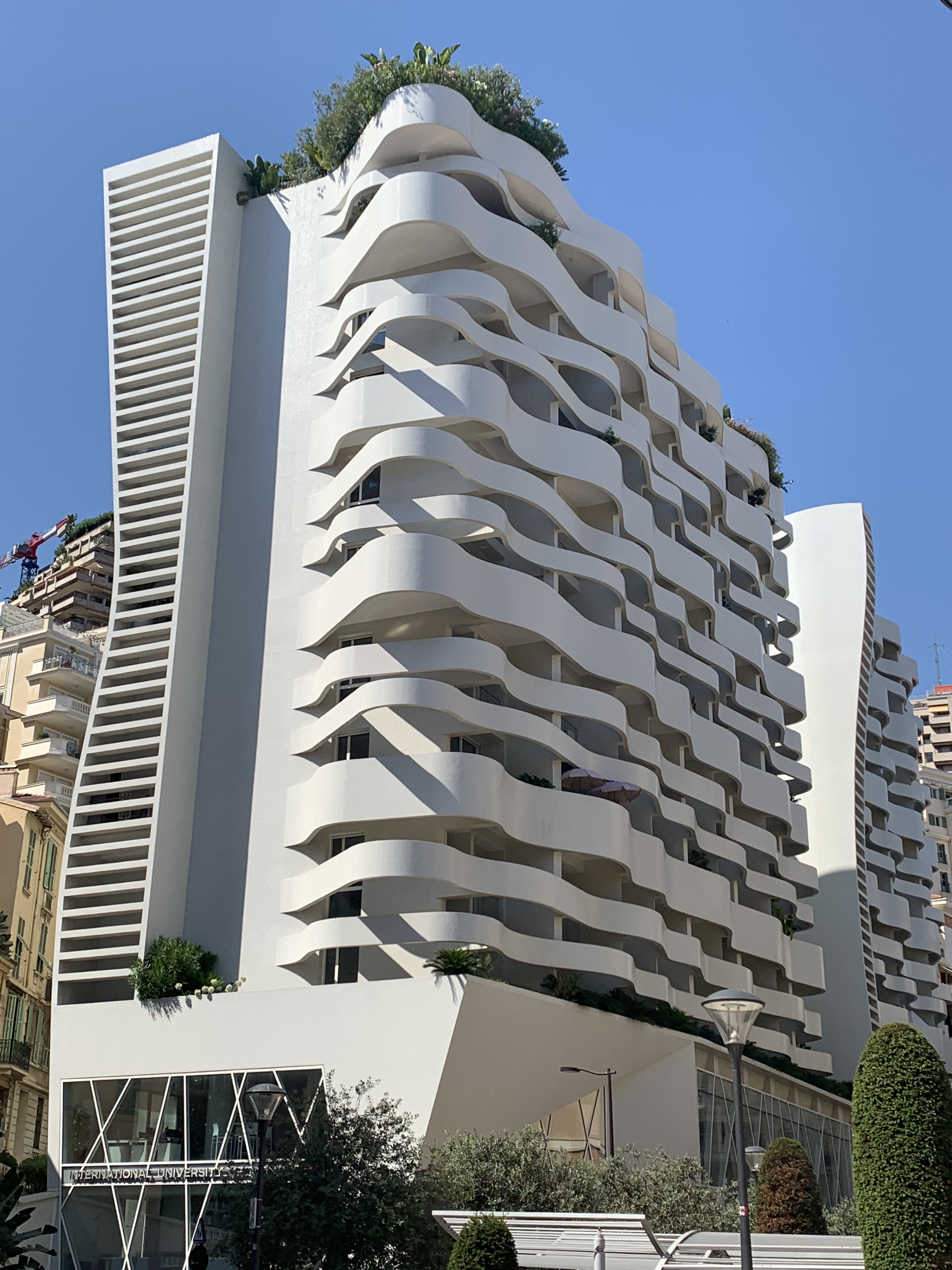
INSEEC Campus in Monaco, French Riviera.

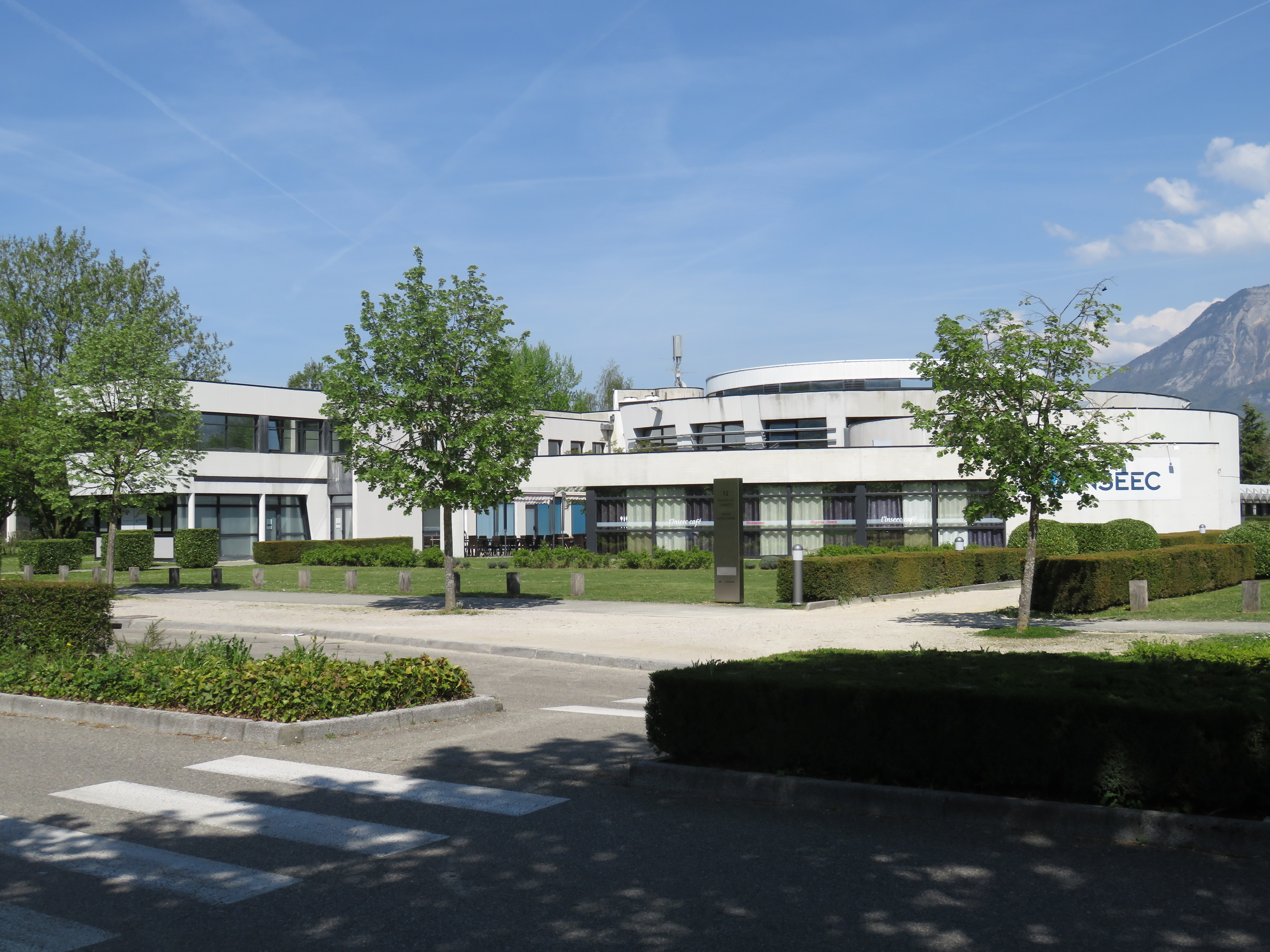
Campus of INSEEC in Chambéry (Savoie) in the French Alps, on the shores of the Lake: Lac du Bourget.

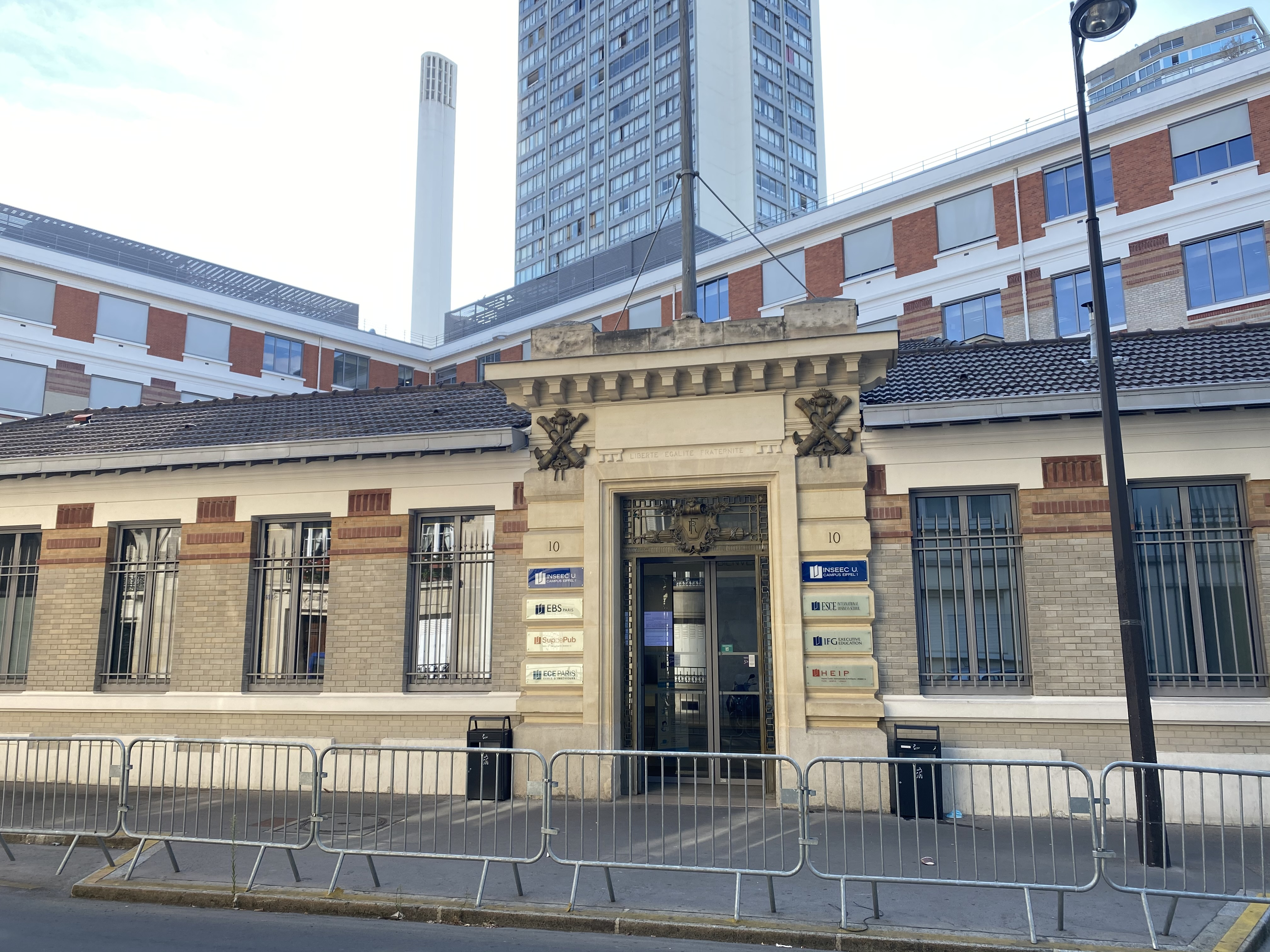
One of INSEEC's parisian Campus : The Eiffel Campus, located 14min away by foot from the Eiffel Tower.

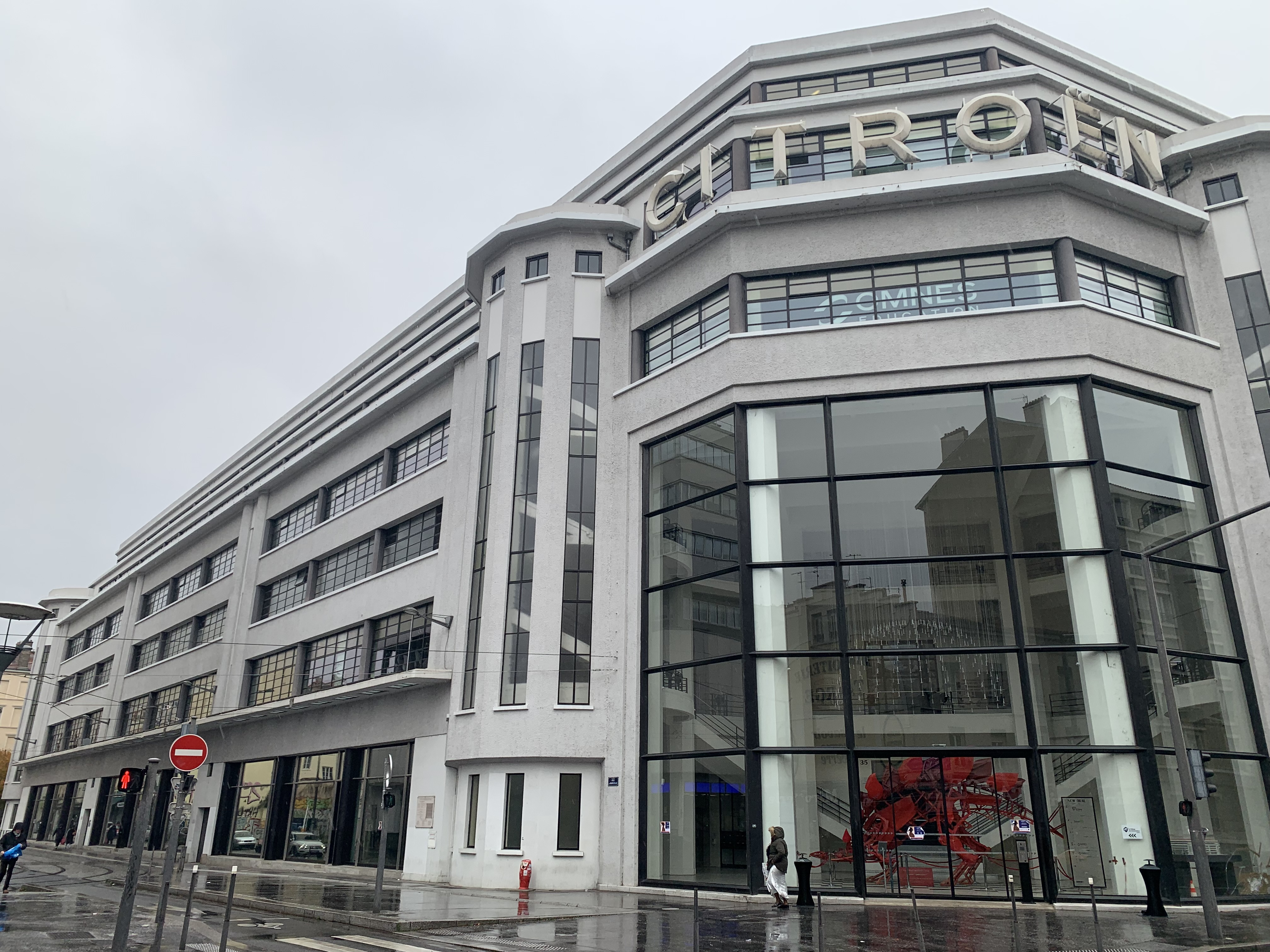
INSEEC Campus in Lyon on Rue de l'Université (in French: University street), in the Art Deco-styled Citroën building, which is accredited as national heritage site and which glass roof was designed by Jean prouvé.

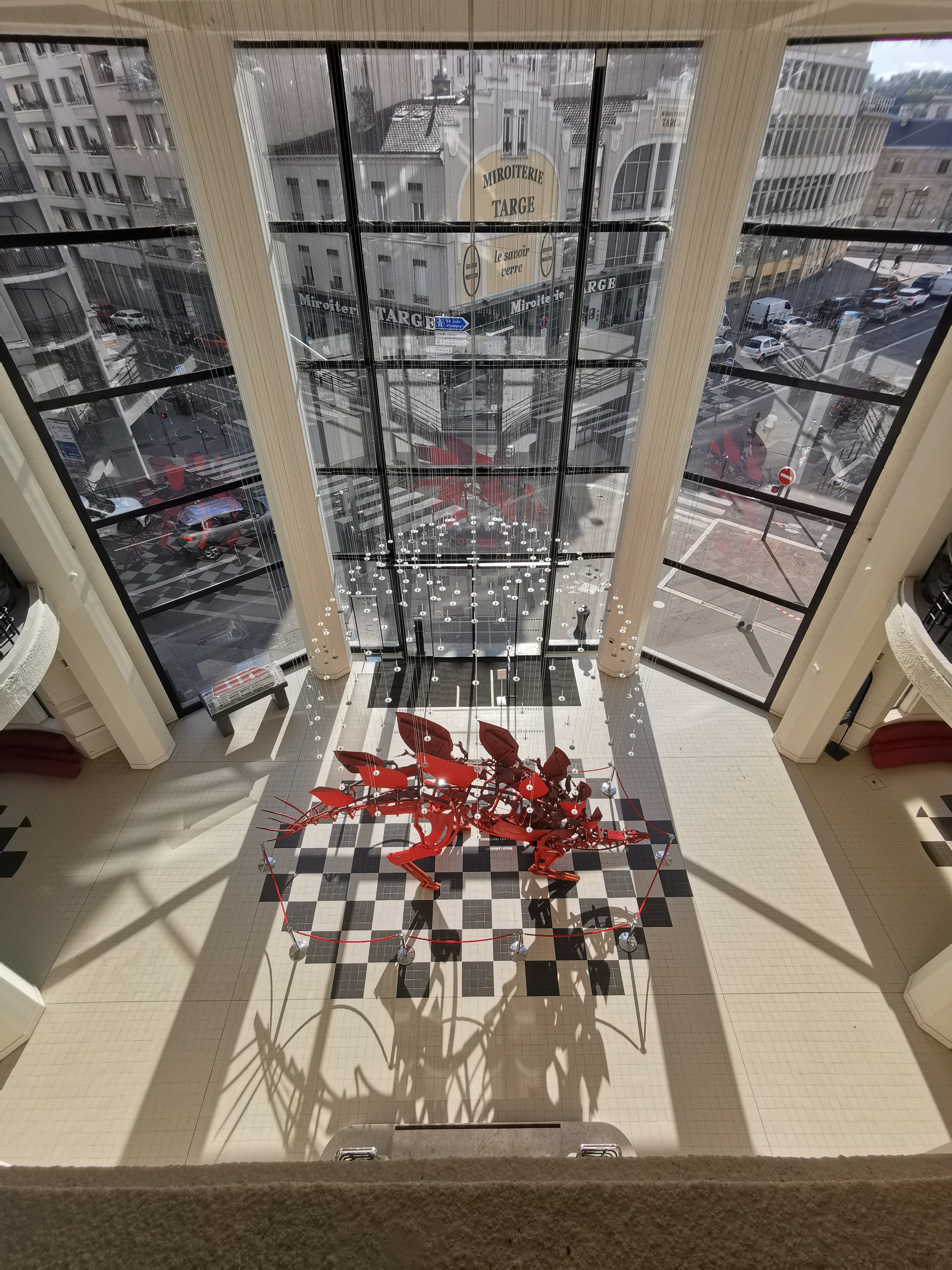
Main lobby of INSEEC's urban Campus in Lyon, inside the Citroën building (view from the third floor).

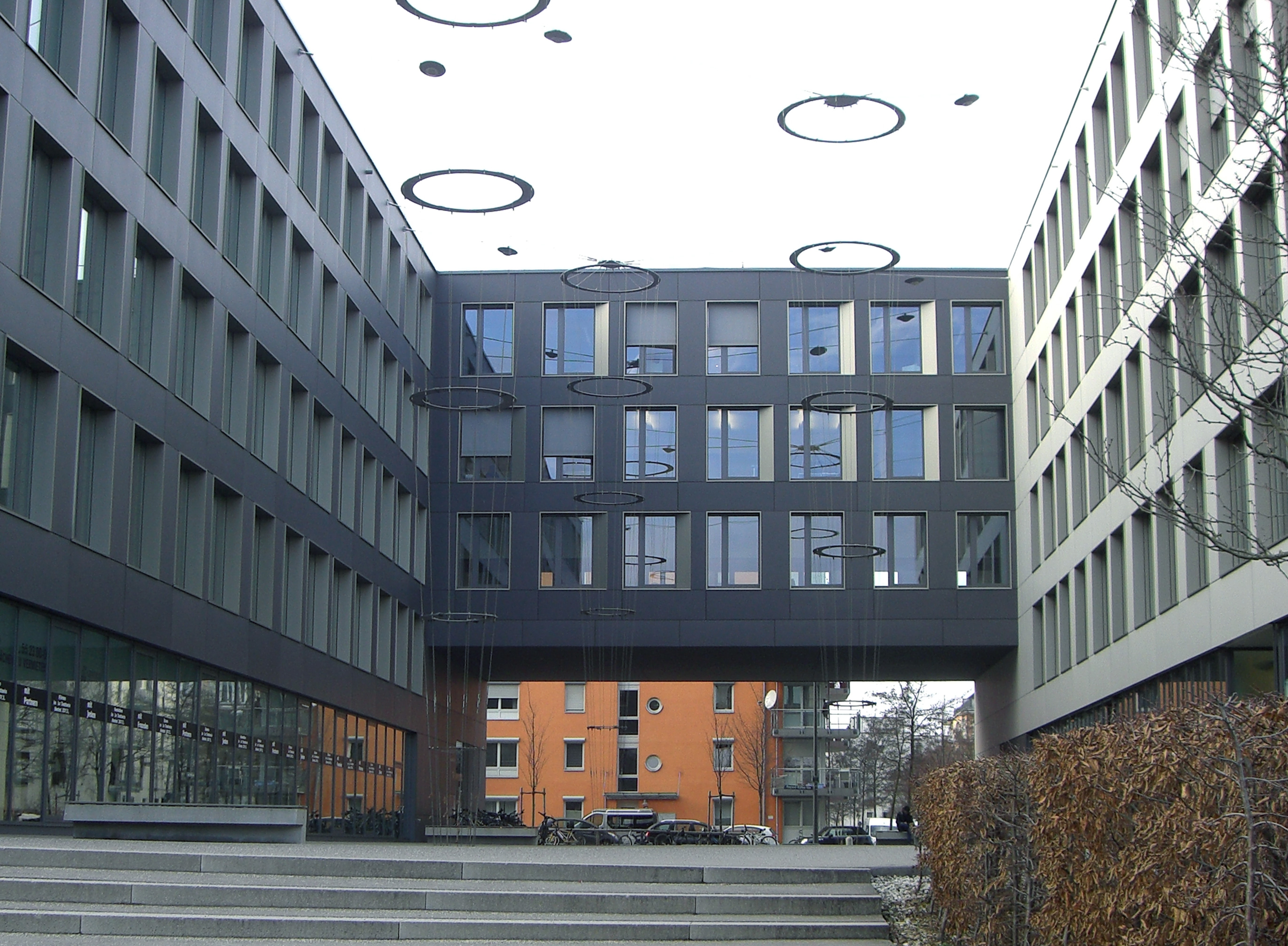
Campus in Munich, Bavaria.

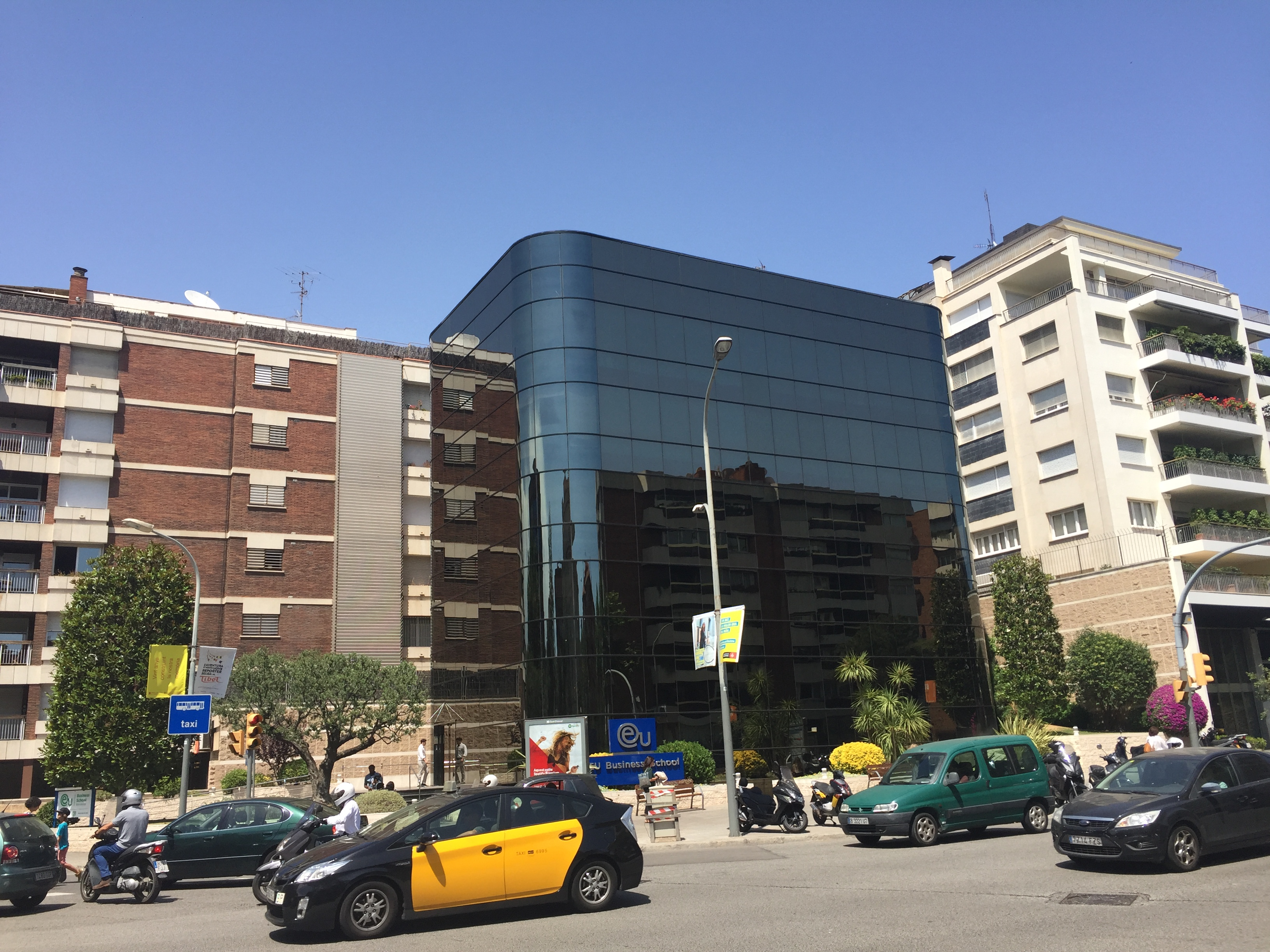
Campus in Barcelona, one of the two INSEEC's campus in Spain.

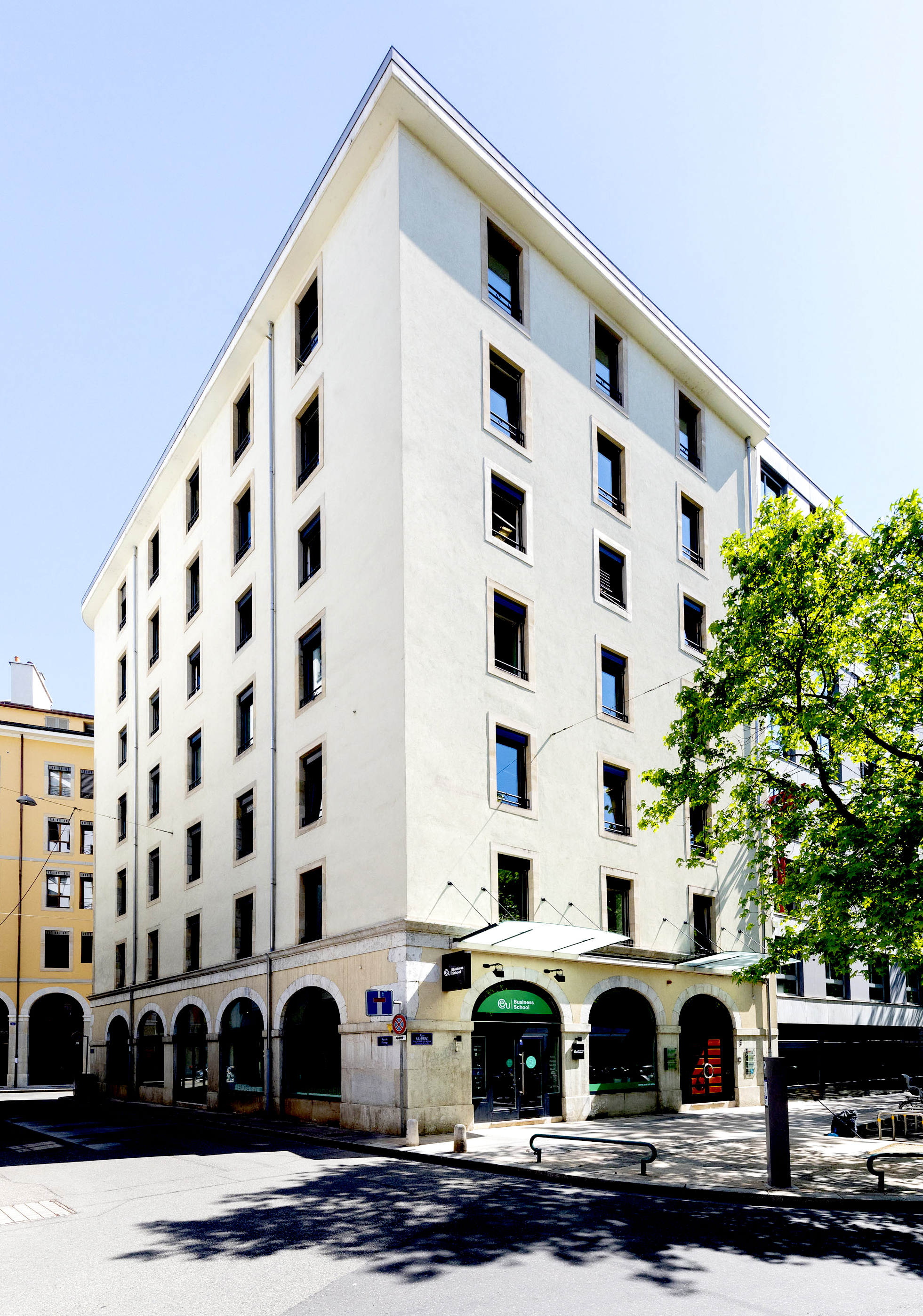
One of the two INSEEC's urban campuses in Geneva, Switzerland, on the shore of the Lake Geneva.

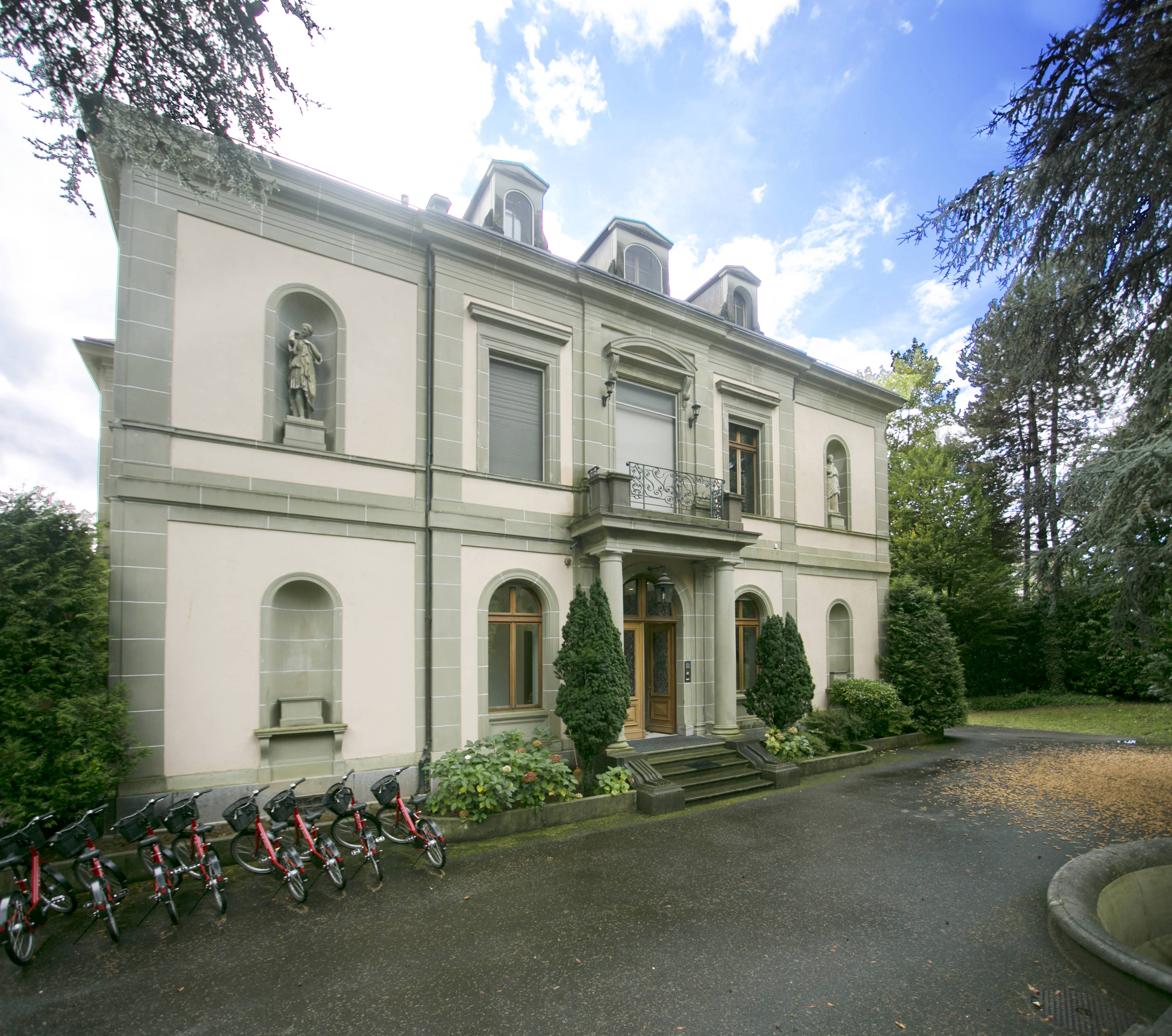
Campus in Montreux, Switzerland, near the shores of Lake Geneva.

== Academic curricula ==
=== Grande Ecole academic features ===
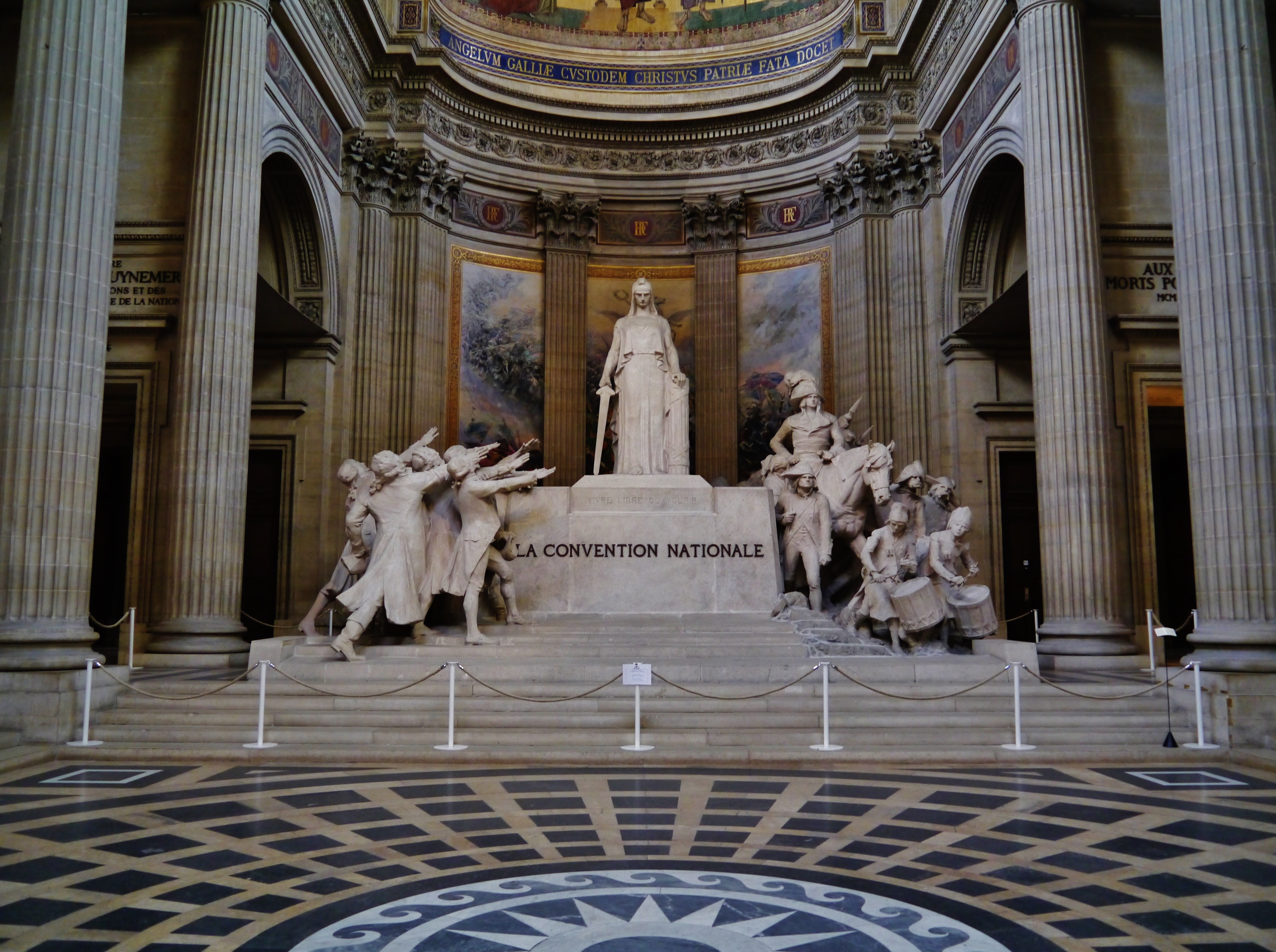
National Convention Altar or also called Republican Altar, inside the Panthéon in Paris. The term grande école originated in 1794 after the French Revolution, upon the creation of the École normale supérieure, of the École centrale des travaux publics (later École polytechnique, France's foremost Grande Ecole of Engineering) by the mathematician Gaspard Monge and Lazare Carnot and of the French National Conservatory of Arts and Crafts by the abbot Henri Grégoire, which all resulted from the National Convention.

The Grande Ecole INSEEC School of Business & Economics provides provides Grande-Ecole degrees, i.e. solely Master's Degrees, MBAs and PhDs (Grande Ecoles do not bestow diploma lower than a European Master's degree level). OMNES Education provides bachelor's degree, non-Grande Ecole Master's degrees, Grande-Ecole Master's Degrees, MBAs and Diploma, as some Schools of the OMNES group are not Grande Ecoles. A Grande Ecole, literally "Great School", is a higher education institution and part of a French league of universities, which select students via national competitive entrance examinations (in French: concours) to safeguard meritocracy and impartiality.

==== National competitive examinations as prerequisite of French Grande Ecoles ====
One of the prerequesite of a Grande Ecole (along with having the Grande Ecole-label), is to select students via national competitive examinations. The latter are well-acknowledged to be particularly stringent. While students prepare for these National Competitive examinations right after their high school diploma (often obtained with a magna cum laude or summa cum laude) during a two-year preparatory programme in high schools proposing such curricula; some other students will start an Undergraduate or Bachelor's degree and prepare for the national Competitive examinations along their studies at Universities or private Colleges in France or abroad. Both pathways have their own advantages and drawbacks.

For candidates coming from preparatory classes, the French national competitive examinations are organised in pools of examinations (Banque de Concours d'Épreuves). INSEEC belongs to the BCE pool. Grande Ecoles only deliver master's degree, with curricula which vary from 3 years up to 2 years (3 years, after successful completion of the national competitive examinations after an Undergraduate Degree-level; 2 years after successful completion of the national entrance competitive examination at a Bachelor-Degree level).

The most selective will enroll less than 10% of candidates, i.e. 90% of candidates are bound to fail, not because they are perform poorly, but because a handful of students performed better, which is in itself, the principle of a competitive examination. In some Grande Ecole, it is possible to retake a Grande Ecole national competitive examination as many as one wishes, whereas some others limit the possibilities to retake the examination to a maximum of three times.

=== Curriculum and academic features ===
==== First Grande Ecole academic year (equivalent to the last year of a European Bachelor's degree) ====
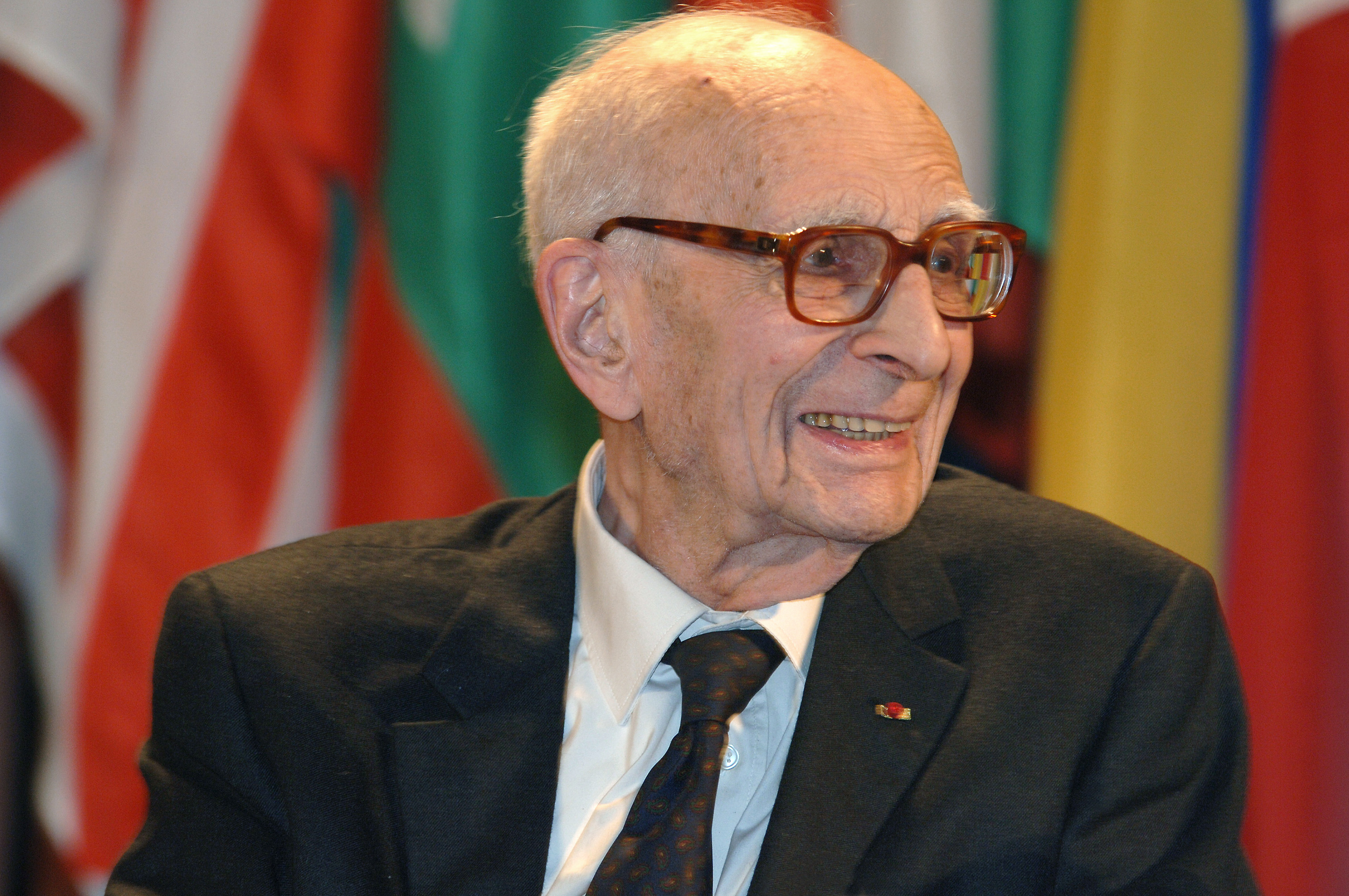
The work of French anthropologist and ethnologist Claude Lévi Strauss had an influence on INSEEC's pedagogy, and especially but not only on the "Corporate Ethnological Mission" which students have to carry out as part of the first year of their Grande Ecole curriculum.

During the first Grande Ecole academic year, which is the equivalent of a Bachelor (sometimes referred to in French as Licence 3 or abbreviated L3), an induction week will take place, followed by a typical student orientation.

Throughout this week, groups of students will have to work out a project, not obviously dealing with business and economics, which will have to be presented along with a report in front of a panel of professors. The goal is to foster group work, team spirit, break the ice among first year students, meet milestones deliverables and train student to defend a thesis in front of a jury, in an academic and corporate way.

At the end of the first year, students have to complete the "Corporate Ethnological Mission". As part of this mission, students form groups and have to draw lots for a randomised subject, which they will have to study in an ethnological fashion. The students' group will be chaperoned by a professor and will have to deliver a Thesis-like report after thorough experts' interviews and literature research, which will be defended in front of a jury during a Viva Voce.

The Grande Ecole INSEEC School of Business and Economics proposes an elective one-week intensive military training with the National Active Non-Commissioned Officers School (ENSOA), a French military academy. This military training often takes place at the end of the first Grande Ecole academic year.

During the first year, students will study from scratch or study again the fundamentals of Business and Management until the first semester of the second academic year, as some new enrolled students do not always have an academic background in business studies. Indeed, as long as you pass the National selective examination with a successfully validated undergraduate degree or bachelor's degree, you can get enrolled in a Grande Ecole. General culture plays a prominent role in the first year of the Grande Ecole curriculum and represents a third of all classes.

Studying in a partner university abroad, or on one INSEEC's campuses abroad is possible during the first year.

==== Second Grande Ecole academic year (equivalent to the first year of a European Master's degree) ====
During the second semester of the second academic year, students can specialize in a major of their own liking: Corporate Finance and Accounting, Market Finance, Strategic Marketing, Operational Marketing, Communication and Public Relations, Entrepreneurship and Innovation Management. Further Specialization is possible too in terms of Languages (Japanese, Russian, Chinese, Arabic) or else. Studying abroad is possible during this year too, so is studying in another university branch of the OMNES Education group.

During, the second year, INSEEC organises across all its campuses an INSEEC Business Games too.

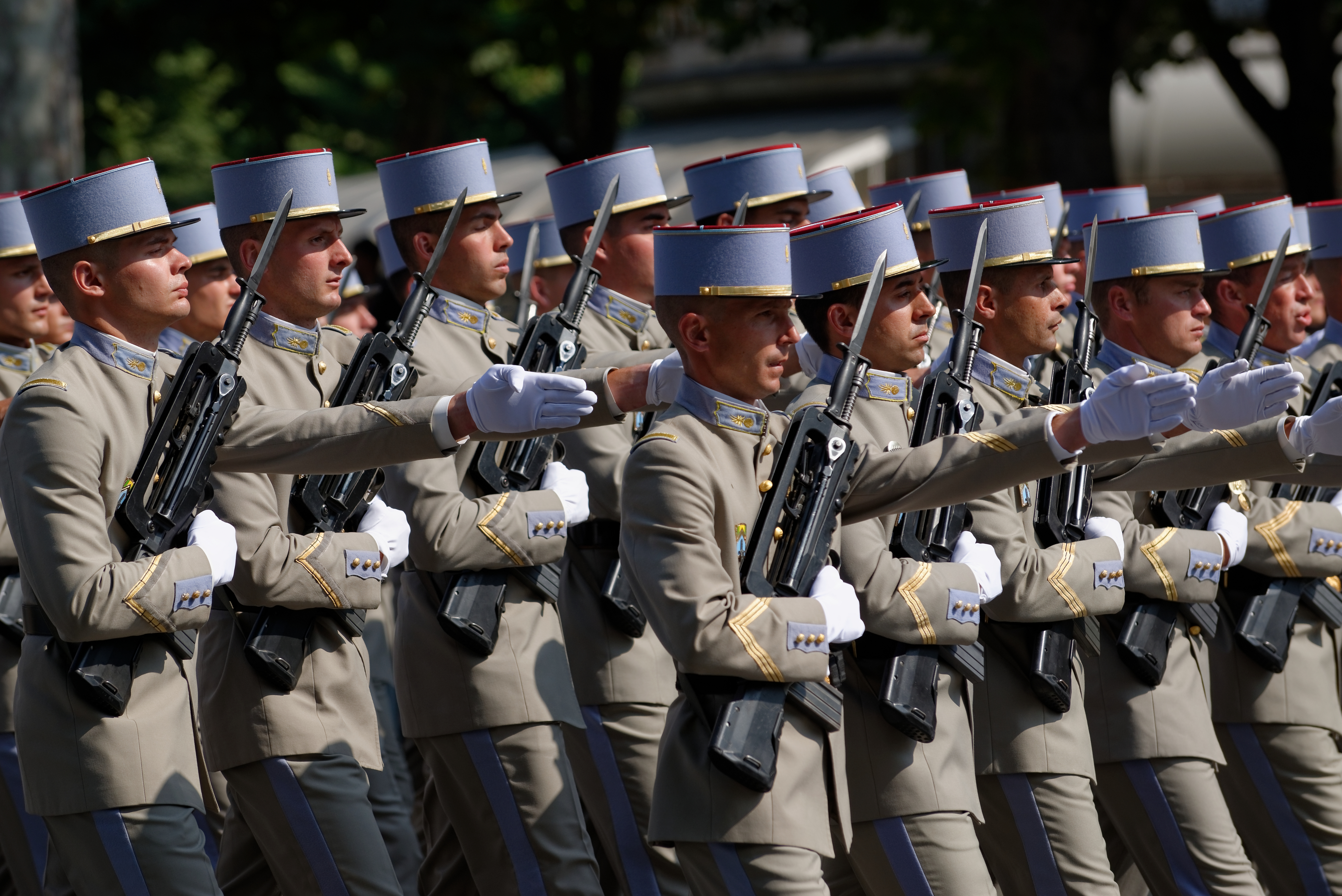
Optional military training programme in cooperation with ENSOA (The French National Active Non-Commissioned Officers School)

==== Third Grande Ecole academic year (equivalent to the second and last year of a European Master's degree) ====
During this third and last year, students who remained in France have a strong academic focus on their major during the first semester. During this same semester, Professor-Researchers from their respective INSEEC laboratories will teach quantitive and qualitative tools for research-purposes, in order to prepare students in advance for their Grande Ecole Master's Thesis; before the start of the second semester, during which students will carry out their last compulsory internship. At the end of the INSEEC Grande Ecole curriculum, students must have carried out a minimum of 11 months of compulsory internship (with an average of 11,82 months during the academic years 2017 and 2020) and a maximum of 41 months; and must have spent at least 6 months abroad, without exceeding a maximum of 41 months either.

The third Grande Ecole academic year is also the main year (but not the only one) for Erasmus exchanges, semesters abroad and Double-Master's Degrees with partner universities.

Since 2007, during the third academic year, the Crisis Management Night takes place, during which students are trained to react to crisis situations. Students will come to the School's campus at 10pm and until dawn will have to form groups in order to solve problems, following pre-defined scenarios prepared by the faculty. Changes to the scenario happen every hour and students must provide deliverables throughout the night, as per defined milestones. Students studying abroad from a partner university are exempted from this programme. Students from other Higher Education Institutions, such as the student magistrates from the Bordeaux National School for the Judiciary (in French: Ecole National de la Magistrature) are invited to the Crisis Night.

Along those lines, as part of the main final examinations at INSEEC, a Viva Voce, in French: Grand Oral (often abbreviated as: Grand O') must be taken in order to complete graduation, during which every students will randomly be attributed a subject to present and defend in front of a jury. Many Grandes Ecoles use Grande Oral as part of their selective examinations or final examinations.

== Agreements ==
INSEEC has woven a network of 183 partner-Universities in 41 countries and 300 international students hosted throughout the OMNES Education campuses every year. In total, the whole INSEEC gathers 515 international academic agreements. In 2016, INSEEC Business School was the fourth Grande Ecole in France with the highest number of students studying abroad.

=== Agreements ===
- The London School of Economics and Political Science (LSE)
- Georgetown University, Washington D.C.
- University of California, Berkeley
- Sorbonne University - Paris
- Panthéon Assas University - Paris
- Renmin University - Beijing (人民大学 - 北京)
- Fudan University (复旦大学)
- University of Shanghai (上海大学)
- University of International Business and Economics - Beijing (对外经济贸易大学)
- Copenhagen Business School
- Grande Ecole Engineering School: École centrale d'électronique
- HEIP (School of Higher International and Political Studies, French: Hautes Etudes Internationales et Politiques), formerly named School of Higher Social Studies (French: École des hautes études sociales) founded in 1894 by Dick May.
  - The Graduate and Doctoral School of HEIP: Center for Diplomatic & Strategic Studies (CEDS) Paris

=== Dual Degrees and Tripartite Degrees ===
- Tsinghua University (清华大学),
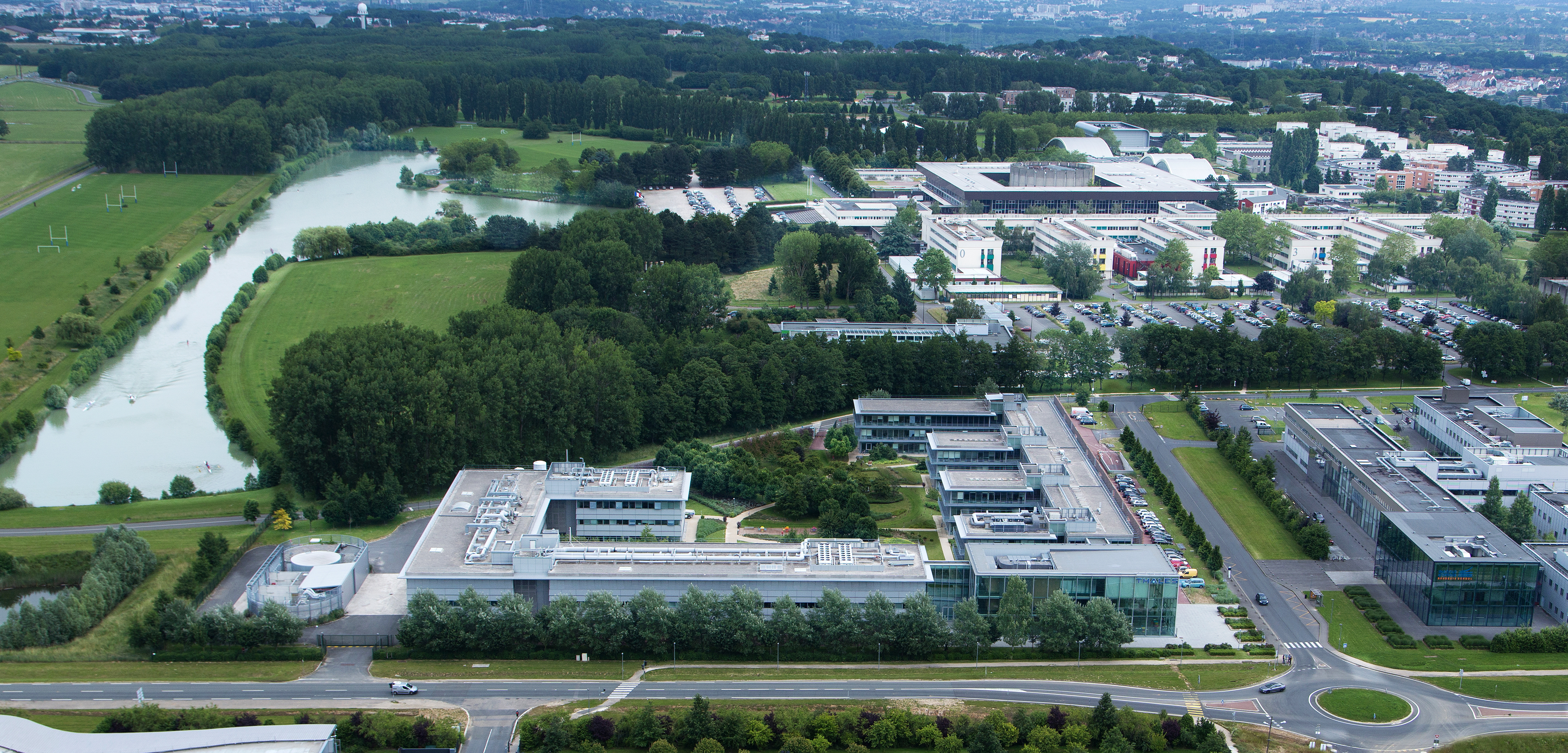
- As part of the Paris-Saclay campus, Paris-Saclay University is affiliated to the UVSQ (University of Versailles), with which INSEEC shares several agreements and double-degrees agreements. Paris-Saclay ranks 13 in the world in 2020 according to ARWU, 1st in Mathematics and 9th in Physics (1st in Europe), with a teaching and academic research staff of 9,000, while catering 48,000 students — which is more than Harvard or Stanford.
  The UVSQ (Saint-Quentin-en-Yvelines University / University of Versailles / University of Paris Saclay) for Bachelors, Masters and Doctorate of Business.
- Bordeaux University,
- International University of Monaco
- University of Granada
- SRH Hochschule Berlin
- Macquarie University
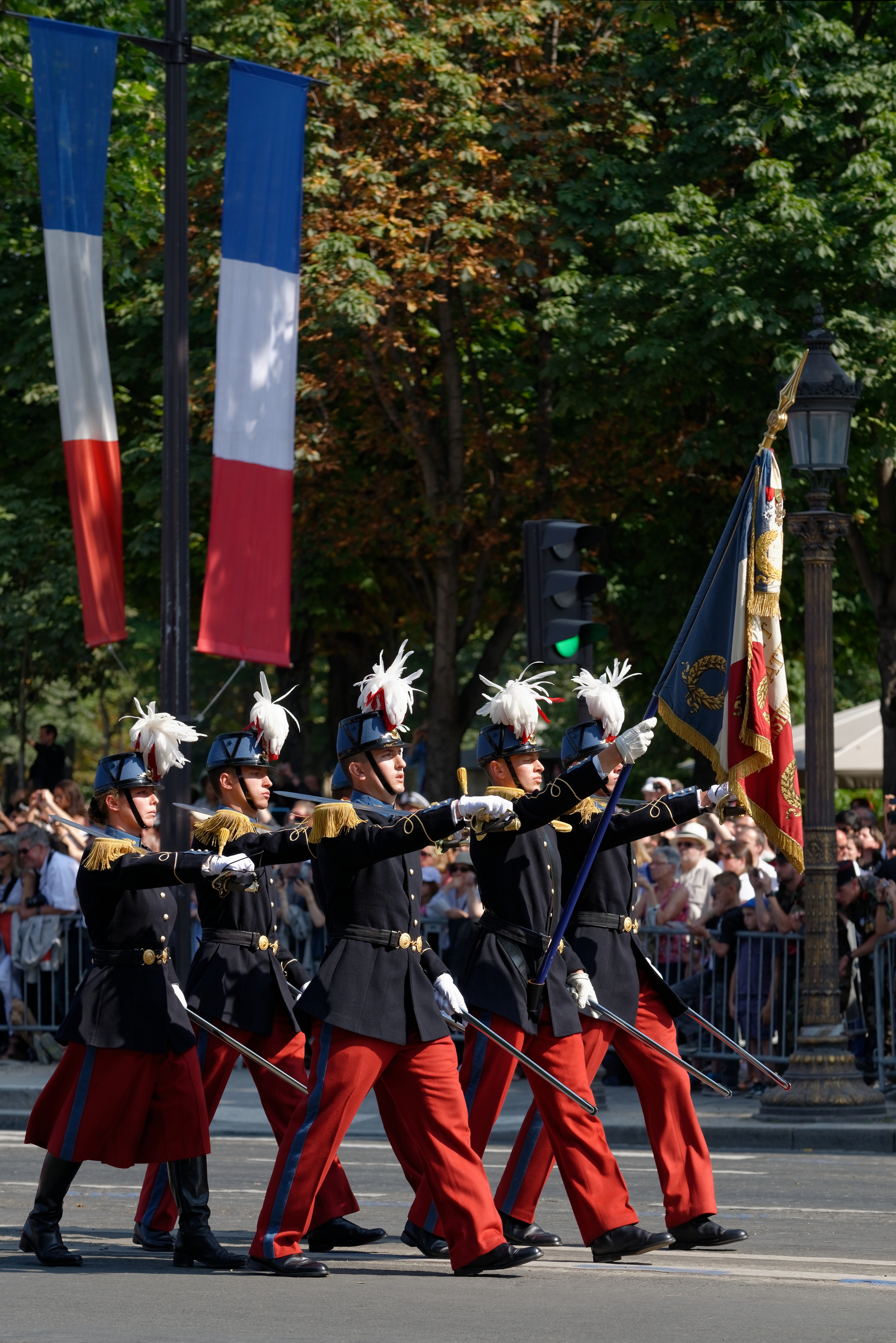
  Example of dual degree with the Grande Ecole and French foremost military academy Saint Cyr, as part of which INSEEC students can complete the last year of their Grande Ecole Master's Degree curriculum, at the end of which students will earn their stripes as reserve officer, and if they wish so, can start missions as sub-officers (in French: sous-officiers). On this picture, the Colour Guard marching on the Champs-Elysées Avenue in Paris on Bastille Day.
- University of Marburg (ACQUIN-accredited)
- Aarhus University, School of Business and Social Sciences: triple crown (AMBA, AACSB, EFMD) double Master's Degree partner university
- HHL Leipzig Graduate School of Management (AASCB and ACQUIN-accredited)
- Arts et Métiers ParisTech (ENSAM Engineering School)
- École spéciale militaire de Saint-Cyr (ESM, literally the "Special Military School of Saint-Cyr") – often referred to as Saint-Cyr, is the foremost French military academy
- ISM University of Management and Economics
- Assumption University of Thailand
- RWTH Aachen

Ranking of French Grande Ecole Business Schools, according to the number of Double master's degree holders, published by the French magazine Le Parisien in 2020.
Grande Ecole Business Schools: alma mater		Location of Campuses in France
1	ESCP Europe	Paris
2	ICN Business School	Nancy
3	ISC Paris	Paris
4.	ESDES	Lyon
5	EM Lyon	Lyon
6	Montpellier Business School	Montpellier
7	INSEEC School of Business & Economics	Bordeaux, Paris, Chambéry, Lyon
8	HEC	Jouy-en-Josas
9	South Champagne Business School	Troyes
10	Kedge Business School	Bordeaux, Marseille

== Rankings ==
INSEEC Business School ranked 7th out of 60 universities in a ranking from Canévet & Associates, a French consultancy. The main criterion of the ranking was the employability of alumni in the top 25 most attractive companies in France.

In the table below, the Grande Ecole INSEEC School of Business & Economics ranks in average 21st (weighted arithmetic mean) best Grande Ecole Business School in France from 2008 until 2022 by the following magazines, consulting companies and institutions: L'Etudiant Magazine, Le Figaro, Challenges, Le Point, Le Parisien, SMBG / Eduniversal, SIGEM (French Integration System for Grandes Ecoles of Management via Preparatory Classes).

INSEEC's worst ranking was given by the French magazine Le Point for the year 2009: 36th and best ranked by the French magazine Challenge in 2008: 12th followed by the French daily Newspaper Le Parisien in 2012 and again in 2013 (13th). All maximum ranking values are written in bold in the chart below, for each issuer, and all worst rankings are underlined. The total amount of French Grande Ecole Business Schools fluctuates yearly owing to several reasons. First, the Grande Ecole parent organisation (Conférence des Grandes Ecoles) has been continuously integrating new members by bestowing its Grande Ecole-label upon these new Business Schools. Second, along this phenomenon, the French Grande Ecole Business Schools' landscape has witnessed an unprecedented trend of inter-schools mergers and acquisitions. In short, the average total number of French Grande Ecole Business Schools oscillates up to roughly 40 Schools, but can overtake this value. For instance, in its ranking published in the year 1999, Le Nouvel Economiste ranked up to 51 Grande Ecole Business Schools.

Rankings of the INSEEC School of Business & Economics from 2008 until 2022, issued by the main French publishers of post-preparatory classes Grande Ecole Business Schools general rankings.
	**2008**	**2009**	**2010**	**2011**	**2012**	**2013**	**2014**	**2015**	**2016**	**2017**	**2018**	**2019**	**2020**	**2021**	**2022**	Average per publisher:
**L'Etudiant**	27	21	23	30	25	32	24	26	22	21	22	21	21	**18**	20	24
**Le Figaro**	17	18	18	**15**	**15**	17	32	22	27	21	22	21	21	21	21	21
**Challenges**	**12**		22		17		22		16		19		23		21	19
**Le Point**		36	33	24	26	26	25	25	25	22	**21**	21	21		22	25
**Le Parisien**		18	16	14	**13**	**13**	21	18	19	20	20	19	19		18	**18**
**SMBG / Eduniversal**		25	20	20	17	17		15	**14**					22	16	19
**SIGEM**	24		20	20	**18**	20	**18**	19	19	19	19	20	19	20	21	20
Average per annum:	22	24	21	21	**19**	21	23	21	20	23	24	23	22	22	20	Weighted arithmetic mean: 21

Other sister-Business Schools of the INSEEC School of Business & Economics, such as the EBS - European Business School (European Foundation for Management Development (EFMD) -accredited) ranked 92nd best worldwide in the professional ranking of world universities compiled by the French Engineering Grande Ecole Paris Mines in 2011. This ranking is based on the number of alumni currently holding the position of CEO in one of the 500 largest companies in the world according to the Fortune Global 500 ranking established by the American business magazine Fortune.

== Campus life ==
=== Students' associations ===
Similarly to many French Grande Ecoles, INSEEC School of Business & Economics hosts more than 30 students' associations on-campus which spans a wide array of missions: charity, gourmet food, wine, sports, arts, digital media, debate, video games, to cite a few.

The students' association landscape in most French Grande Ecole revolves around three major associations: BDE (Bureau des Etudiants, in French: Students' Association), BDS (Bureau des Sports, in French: the Association of Sports), BDA (Bureau des Arts, in French: the Association of Arts) following a one-year rotation via elections. Any students on-campus can vote to elect a team led by a president and vice-president for each BDE, BDS and BDA. The BDE is in charge of organising students' life in general, for example: students' well-being on-campus, discounts at local restaurants or shops around the school, students' night life. The BDS and BDA embody a similar role but will organise activities: Sports for the BDS (sports events, students' rugby league, sailing classes, cruises & events for students of the OMNES Education's Schools, sailing competitions against other Grande Ecoles such as The EDHEC Sailing Cup ("ESC") (Course Croisière EDHEC or "CCE" in French) is the leading student sporting event in Europe and the world's biggest intercollegiate offshore regatta) and the Arts for the BDA (on-campus concerts, events, visits of museums, cinema on-campus, classes of theatrical performance at the National Theatre of Bordeaux).

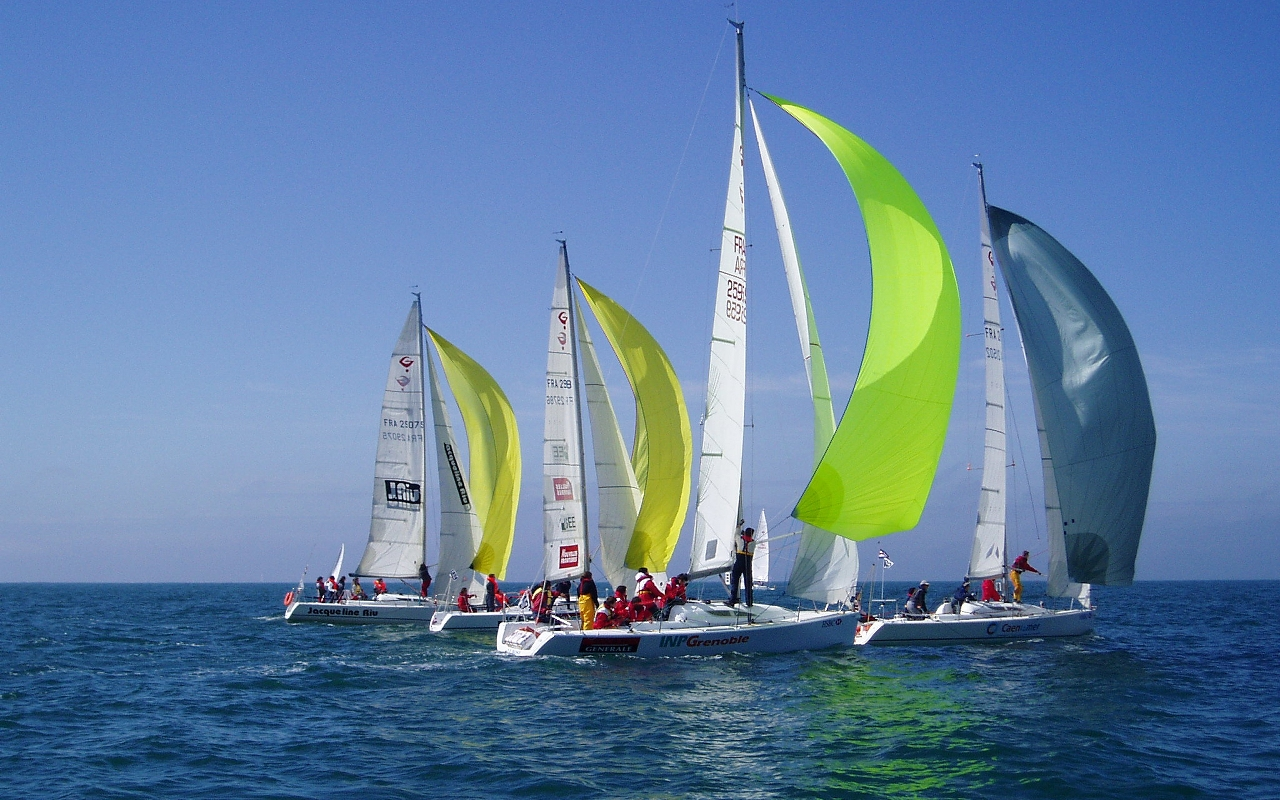
Sailing along with Rugby is prominently featured at INSEEC. The sailing highlight of the academic year is the EDHEC Sailing Cup: the leading students sporting event in Europe and the world's biggest intercollegiate offshore regatta.

As usual in most Grande Ecole, a Gala soirée is organised once every academic year - not to be confused with the graduation ceremony. Usually, an on-campus student association is solely dedicated to organise this annual event. At INSEEC, the election results of a BDE (Bureau des Etudiants, in French: Students' Association) unfolds during the yearly Gala soirée evening.

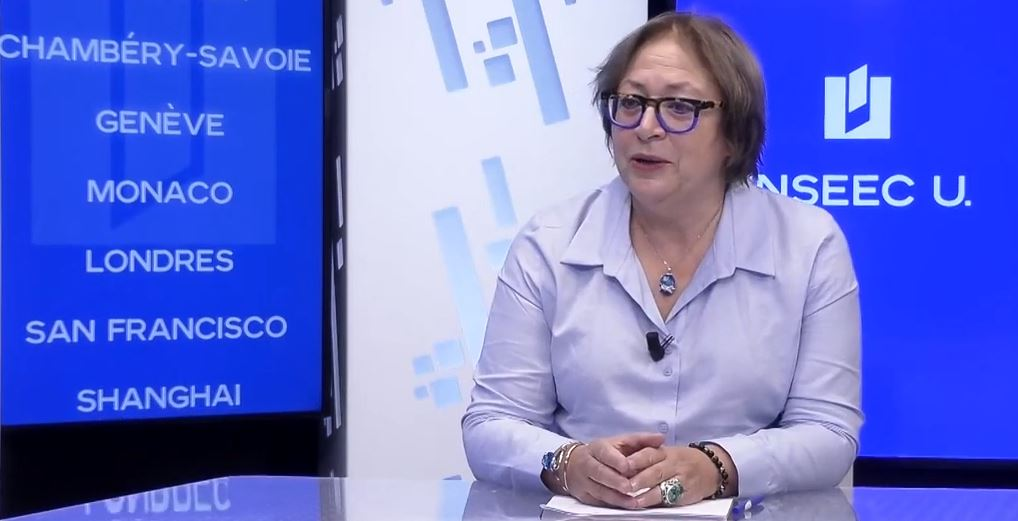
Sylvie Faucheux, Professor of sustainable Economics at INSEEC, giving an interview on INSEEC's WebTV.

=== Online and on-campus broadcasting services ===
INSEEC also broadcasts its own media stream: INSEEC TV, consisting in short videos about Economics, Business, Political Science, Sociology and Pedagogy, where academic experts from the OMNES Education institution or from the Research Laboratories the INSEEC School of Business & Economics can debate, share new ideas or present their latest academic research.

=== Start-ups and spin-offs incubators ===
INSEEC hosts 6 business incubators along with Junior Entreprises. A Junior Enterprise is a typical Students' founded incubating campus-based association, which business model is based upon consulting services provided to local customers, where student's are in charge of its profitability and management. The management team's turnover of such on-campus micro-enterprises follow academic years. Junior Enterprises are often found on Grande Ecole campuses, although not exclusive to Grande Ecoles.

Companies incubators such as the Incub'INSEEC (also called Innov'INSEEC) in Paris and Bordeaux differ from Junior Entreprises (often called: Junior, by students in France), as their goal is not to create an on-campus entrepreneurial association in consulting, but rather to foster entrepreneurship by helping alumni and current students to establish their own start-up. Incub'INSEEC will provide infrastructures, workshops, conferences, commodities, communication networks in order to underpin students' and alumni's nascent entrepreneurial projects. Junior Entreprise follow a different set of rules and prerequisites. Unlike companies stemming from Innov'INSEEC, they are no spin-offs. They are dedicated to students in order to sharpen their entrepreunarial spirit and put into practise their theoretical knowledge. As such, students will have to carry out assignments (called missions) for local customers, such as accountancy and finance audits, consulting services in communication and marketing. Another distinctive feature of Junior Entreprise: they need to pass several years of testing and audits in order to be certified by a National Organisation as Junior Entreprise. They are bestowed upon this accreditation by the French National Confederation of Junior Enterprises (in French: Confédération nationale des Junior-Entreprises - CNJE) founded in 1969.

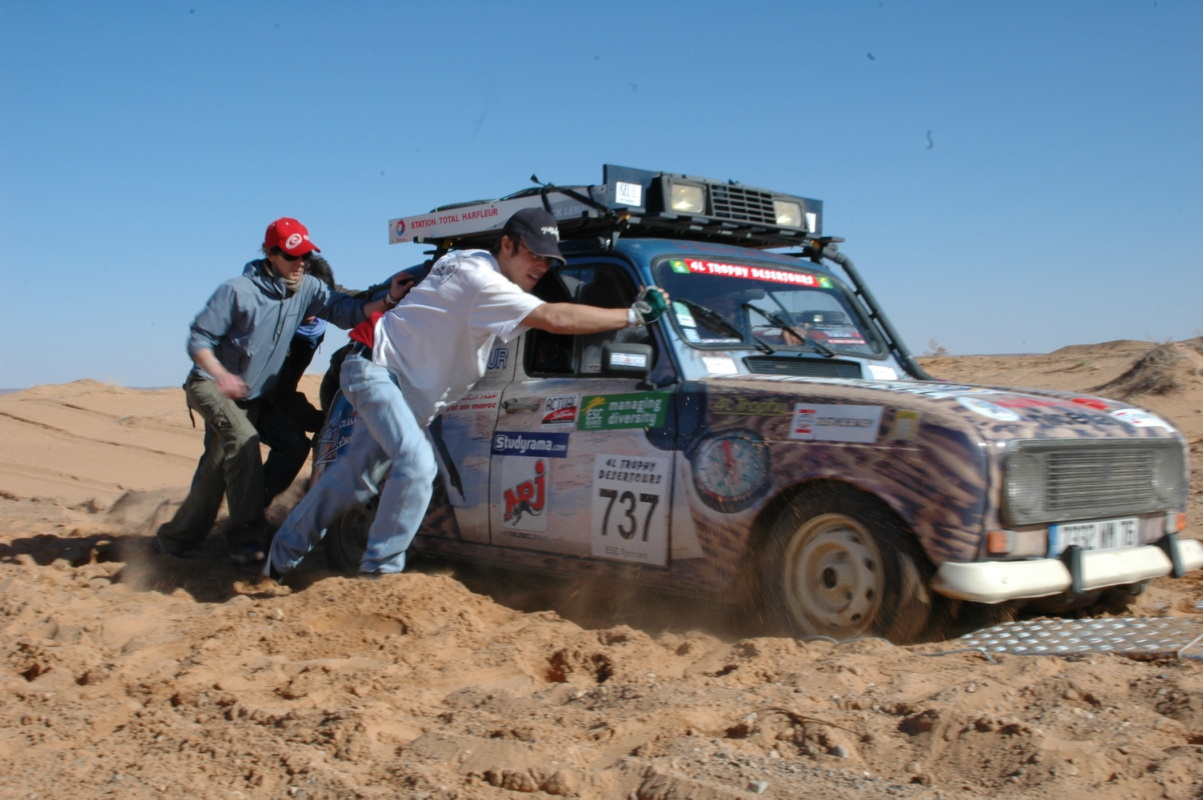
The 4L Trophy is a yearly humanitarian rally and inter-collegiate event across the Moroccan desert. Launched in 1997 by Jean-Jacques Rey, it is organised by Desertours in partnership with the French Grande Ecole Rennes School of Business (Brittany).

=== INSEEC Junior Enterprise ===
The first Junior Entreprise of INSEEC is INSEEC Conseil on the Bordeaux Campus of the Grande Ecole INSEEC School of Business & Economics, which officially became a Junior Entreprise-accredited by the French National Confederation of Junior Enterprises in 2012. Amongst its most notorious customers, it counts the French transnational company Veolia in Transport, Water and Waste Treatment or the multinational company in accounting services KPMG, Coca-Cola or France second biggest regional daily press in terms of issuance in 2019, the Bordeaux-based Sud-Ouest newspaper. As Junior Enterprises are associations, they can get sponsors. INSEEC Conseil is sponsored by the French Bank: BNP Paribas, the world's eighth largest bank by total assets.

=== Bloomberg Terminal ===
For training-purposes, a Bloomberg facility is available on the Campus of Paris and Bordeaux, for students enrolled in the financial sector, during the last year of the Grande Ecole Curriculum. A Bloomberg Aptitude Test can be taken on both campus too.

=== Paris Leadership Week ===
Twice a year, during the second and last year of Master's degrees students, experts in geopolitics and in management, as well as senior executives are invited to talk in English and in French, about the latest management method and trends, and latest geopolitical developments on the international scene. The impact of management on society is discussed, but also the inter-dependences of each academic disciplines. Key-note speakers are usually senior executives from SMEs and multinational corporations working in fields such as Finance, Sports management, Marketing, Business Development, Human Resources; but also management experts, consultants, sociologists and experts in international affairs.

=== Inter-campus debates and rhetoric contests. ===
Debates and rhetoric competitions are organised on-campus, but also inter-campus, where INSEEC can compete against other Schools of the OMNES Education group, along with courses in eloquence given at INSEEC's campuses.

=== Optional military training ===
The Grande Ecole INSEEC School of Business and Economics holds a one-week intensive military training with the National Active Non-Commissioned Officers School.

=== INSEEC Business Games ===
Every year, students enrolled in the second semester of the Grande Ecole Master's degree first academic year will attend the Business Games, which is an on-campus event, during which students are confronted to a business case, but are free in the way they can appraise and solve it. The Business Games last a week, are not inter-campus Games and bestow the best teams in a general ranking, and according to a specific ranking too, in which the teams which performed the best in either Marketing, Sales, Finance/Accounting or Strategy will be bestowed upon a prize from a Jury composed of Scholars and Executives invited on-campus for the occasion.

== Notable alumni ==
- Michel Landel, born in Meknes, Morocco. He was the CEO, Director and Chairman of the Executive Committee of Sodexo until January 2018.
- Jacques-Antoine Granjon, French entrepreneur and CEO of Veepee
- Arthur Sadoun, French businessman, chairman & CEO of Publicis Group
- Christophe Blanchet, Politician and Deputy at the French National Assembly
- Julien Noble, President of international Marketing at the global headquarters of Universal Pictures.
- Sébastien Missoffe, Vice President & Managing Director France at Google
- Olivier de Muret de Labouret, Group Consolidation Manager at Kering, and founder of INSEEC's incubating Junior Enterprise on the Bordeaux campus in 2009.
- Sophie Boardman, Vice President of Products at Gaynor Minden.
- Jean-François Raudin, General Manager France at Air Canada
- Victoria Dellinger, Public Relations and Partnerships Officer of the UNESCO (United Nations)
- Laura Georges, former professional football player
- William Rozé, Member of the Capgemini Group Executive Committee and former CEO of Altran (now called: Capgemini Engineering)
- Arnaud Deschamps, vice-president at Nestlé | Head of Nescafé Dolce Gusto
- Cyril Baillardran, CEO at Canelés Baillardran
- Stanislas de Bentzmann, cofounder of Devoteam and former director of KEDGE Business School
- Philippe Claverol, Vice-president - Sales and Marketing - Stellantis
- Frédéric Grangié, President of Chanel Watches and Jewelry
- Georges-Mohamed Chérif, Founder, CEO and artistic director of Buzzman
- François Castro-Lana, co-founder of Creapills
- Vanessa Moungar, Franco-Chadian executive, INSEEC and Harvard alumnus.
  - Head of diversity and inclusion at LVMH
  - Director of the Gender, Women and Civil Society Department at the African Development Bank in July 2017.
  - Appointed to the Presidential Council for Africa in 2017 of French President Emmanuel Macron.

== Alumni network ==
There are around 40,000 INSEEC Alumni registered on LinkedIn, and 100,000 according to the ADI (The INSEEC Alumni Association, in French: Association des Anciens de l'INSEEC).

INSEEC was in September 2016 the sixth French Grande Ecole with the largest alumni network on LinkedIn.

The three largest employers of INSEEC alumni in 2022 were Crédit Agricole, BNP Paribas and AXA.

Number of French Grande Ecole Business Schools alumni on LinkedIn, data recorded by the French Magazine L'Express in September 2016.
	Grande Ecole Business School	Campuses across France	Number of alumni recorded on LinkedIn
1	HEC	Jouy-en-Josas	57,891
2	ESSEC	Cergy-Pointoise	53,687
3	ESCP Europe	Paris	48,893
4	Kedge	Bordeaux, Marseille	44,963
5	Neoma	Reims, Rouen	44,136
6	INSEEC	Bordeaux, Paris, Lyon, Chambéry	40,373
7	Skema	Lille, Paris, Sophia-Antipolis	34,634
8	Edhec	Lille, Nice, Paris	32,466
9	EM Lyon	Lyon	30,760
10	Grenoble Ecole de Management	Grenoble	29,797

In the ranking 2021 of L'Etudiant, the Grande Ecole INSEEC School of Business & Economics reached a grade of 4 out of 5, the equivalent of a magna cum laude in terms of its alumni network potency which reached in 2020: 58,880.

== Notable faculty ==
With 77% of prominent professors amongst its faculty staff, the Grande Ecole INSEEC School of Business & Economics received the grade 5 out of 5, the highest grade given by L'Etudiant, the equivalent of a summa cum laude. INSEEC's faculty is composed of full-time faculty/researchers, full-time faculty/teaching faculty, adjunct professors, visiting lecturers and guests professors.

- Sylvie Faucheux, Director of Research and Academic Innovation, is an Economist and Professor / Researcher in the Economics of Sustainability, Sustainable Innovation, Management of smart cities, the Economics of Ecodistricts and Green Building. She is a knight of the Ordre des Palmes Académiques, a member of the Ordre national du Mérite, a knight of the Legion of Honour and holds the Marianne d'Or award of year 2009 for her actions in favour of sustainable development.
- Erik Orsenna (second from the left), President of OMNES Education's Academic Advisory Board, here with French President Emmanuel Macron and former Minister of Culture Françoise Nyssen. Orsenna is a London School of Economics and Science-Po Paris graduate in Philosophy, Economics and Political Science, he was a close collaborator of François Mitterrand and held several government positions in the 1980s and 1990s. He is a member of the Conseil d'État and of the Académie Française.
- Christine Albanel, President of OMNES Education's Research Responsible Advisory Board. She is a French politician and civil servant. From May 2007 to June 2009, she was France's Minister for Culture and Communication in François Fillon's government.
- Fathallah Sijilmassi is a Moroccan politician and economist. He is the current Secretary General of the secretariat of the Union for the Mediterranean.
- Marie-Hélène Caillol is a professor in Geopolitics, Sociology, Anticipation and Political Science. She is an analyst of the global systemic transition and crisis as well as a specialist in European, Mediterranean and international affairs. With Franck Biancheri, she is the co-founder of the European Think-Tank LEAP (French: Laboratoire Européen d'Anticipation Politique, English: European Laboratory of Political Anticipation) established in 1997 as "Europe2020" and is the current President of it.
- Mary Teuw Niane is a Doctor in Mathematics, Minister of Education, Innovation and Research (from 2012 until 2019), he is currently Professor at the Cheikh Anta Diop University in Dakar, Senegal.
- Gilles Moutiers, is a Doctor in Physics, Senior Expert and Programme Director in Global Security and Embedded Systems at the French Alternative Energies and Atomic Energy Commission. He is also Chief Editor of the scientific journal European Physical Journal, Nuclear sciences and technologies section.

== Research ==
With originally two main research laboratories: one in Paris and one in Bordeaux, INSEEC has 5 research centres since it became the INSEEC School of Business & Economics (part of the OMNES Eductation institution). Full-time faculty researchers are fully employed by INSEEC's Research Institute on one of the INSEEC's Research Laboratory (on the campus of Paris, Bordeaux, Lyon or Monaco). At the Grande Ecole INSEEC School of Business & Economics, 98% of professors were doctors and 46% of them hold a PhD from abroad, according to the French magazine L'Etudiant recorded for the academic year 2018/2019, i.e. faculty staff holding a PhD, obtained in France or abroad and working as permanent professor on-campus at least 4 days a week.

Research at INSEEC revolves around the following fields:

- Risk forecasting and assessment in complex environments:
  - Governance, risk and value creation,
  - Finance and innovation,
  - Mathematical models for scientific and financial purposes,
  - Finance and economics in an era undergoing rapid global changes,
  - Financial services, corporate governance and risk management.
- Social transition and emergent behaviours:
  - Social transition and emergent consumer behaviours,
  - Consumption in a globalised and digitalised world,
  - Smart city sensors (in cooperation with OMNES Education's Grande Ecole Engineering School: ECE, as part of the "PI-ECE", in French: Programme interdisciplinaire ECE; in English: ECE's interdisciplinary research programme),
  - International Management,
  - Sustainability, Luxury and Hospitality.
- Creation and innovation:
  - Social transition and emergent consumer behaviours,
  - Consumption in a globalised and digitalised world,
  - Smart city sensors,
  - Innovative processes and emergent behaviours in a globalised world,
  - Innovative luxury consumer experience management and emerging consumers behaviours.
- Smart interactions:
  - Networks, interactions and their geography,
  - Consumption in a globalised and digitalised world,
  - Nanoscience and Nanotechnology (in cooperation with OMNES Education's Grande Ecole Engineering School: ECE),
  - Global value chains, distribution & Supply Chains,
  - Globalisation challenges for SMEs in finance, hospitability and luxury.

According to the Magazine L'Etudiant in its yearly rankings, the quality of research articles is categorised into 5 levels of quality:

- 1*: the most prestigious level.
  - L'Etudiant will take into account the number of articles published from 2017 until 2019 in the Scientific Journals ranked 1e, 1g and 1eg by the CNRS (French National Centre for Scientific Research) and 1* by the FNEGE (French National Foundation for Management Education)
  - The lower-tier research publications are taken into account separately by L'Etudiant, i.e. categories: 2, 3, 4.

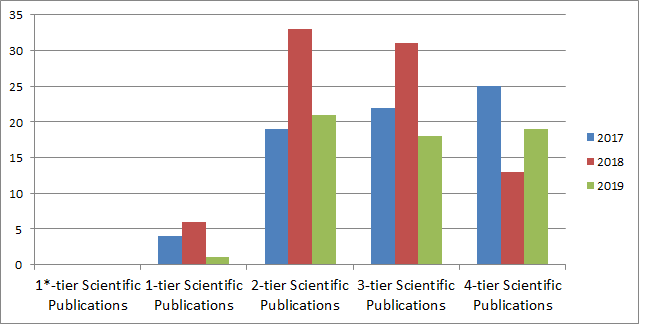
Number of articles successfully issued in scientific literature from 2017 until 2019, according to the Scientific Publications' nomenclature of the CNRS (French National Centre for Scientific Research) and FNEGE (French National Foundation for Management Education), 1* being the most prestigious in France and 4 the least prestigious, as per the French Magazine L'Etudiant Grande Ecole Business School Ranking of 2021.

- INSEEC is a M-accredited Business School, according to the French Magazine L'Etudiant.
  - The M-label means that the Business School considered is able to deliver Master's degrees of Science or of Arts and is involved in Research activities.
- Research productivity: The INSEEC School of Business and Economics has been bestowed upon the grade 12,2 out of 20, the equivalent of a cum laude (3 Points out of 5) by the French Magazine L'Etudiant in terms of Research Productivity in 2021.
  - The criterion "Research Productivity" is a ranking criterion taking into account the number of articles and their quality published by professors a considered Business School within the last three years, in that case: from the 1 January 2017 until 31 December 2019. Those publications must be affiliated to the CNRS (French National Centre for Scientific Research) and FNEGE (French National Foundation for Management Education), the whole divided by the Business School's numbers of students. This criterion indicates the performance of the School according to its size.
- Research potency / output: The INSEEC School of Business and Economics has been bestowed upon the distinction "Very Good" and a grade of 4 out 5, the equivalent of a magna cum laude, by the French Magazine L'Etudiant in 2021.
  - The criterion "Research potency / output" takes into account the number and the quality of research articles of the last three years, i.e. 1 January 2017 until 31 December 2019. Those publications must be affiliated to the CNRS (French National Centre for Scientific Research) and FNEGE (French National Foundation for Management Education), ranging from category 1* being the most prestigious scientific literature publishers to 4, being the least prestigious. The intermediate prestige-tiers are ranked in descending order of importance: 1, 2, 3. This criterion enables big performers, i.e. large schools with significant Research resources to stand out in terms of quality and quantity of submitted scientific papers.

The Research Laboratories of the Grande Ecole INSEEC School of Business & Economics are part of a larger construct involving the whole OMNES Education. The Research Network of OMNES Education involves Grande Ecole Business Schools & Engineering Schools throughout several French & European Research Laboratories. The research topics revolve around the OMNES Education's core specialties and academic offer. The cornerstones of Research at INSEEC are twofold: multidisciplinarity and transversal syllabi, in order to foster knowledge cross-seeding and bridge synergies between laboratories and faculty staff. The PI-ECE (ECE-Lyon Interdisciplinary Program), focusing on Smart City sensors, exemplifies these two pillars well.

In total, there are five research laboratories for nine campuses, which involve around 120 Research Professors. During the first year of the Grande Ecole Master's Degree, students can carry out an introductory course in the form of a pedagogic project (called in French Mission de Recherche, in English: Research Mission), in a research subject of their own liking amongst the INSEEC research specialities, where the-said students will be chaperoned by a Professor Researcher during several weeks. The final project will have to be defended in front of a panel of INSEEC's researchers and professors during a Viva Voce, including the submission of a report written in a research article fashion. The same year, in other words in the run-up of the final Grande Ecole year, students are also trained by Professor Researchers to use quantitative and qualitative research tools in order to carry out and analyse as well as defend their Master's Thesis in front of a Jury, as part of the Grande Ecole final Viva Voce, which takes place along the so-called Grand Oral (Viva Voce of General Culture and often abbreviated in French as Grand O).

== Accreditation and memberships ==
The INSEEC School of Business and Economics is AMBA-accredited and a member of Association to Advance Collegiate Schools of Business (AACSB). It has received accreditation from the Union of Independent Grandes Écoles, EFMD, VISA (in French: Le visa du ministère de l'Enseignement supérieur et de la Recherche, in English: Approval of the French Ministry for Higher Education and Research), DD-RS (in French: Développement durable et responsabilité sociétale, in English: Sustainability and Societal Responsibility), CEF DG (in French: Commission d'évaluation des formations et diplômes de gestion, in English: National Commission for the Evaluation of Training and Qualifications in Management), the latter enables French business schools via the decree number 2001–295 on April 4, 2001, to be accredited as a master's degree-level higher education institution.
