= Master in Management (France) =

Master's degree at the business schools of France

In France, a Master in Management (MiM), known in French as the "Programme Grande École" (PGE), literally "Grande École program", is a three-year higher education course in business management offered by accredited public and private business Grandes Écoles and evaluated by the French Government through the CEFDG - Commission d'évaluation des formations et diplômes de gestion. It awards a master's degree, associated with level 7 ISCED of the National Professional Qualifications Register.

In France, Grandes Écoles are elite academic institutions and an alternative system to universities that admit students through an extremely competitive process. It's similar to the Ivy League in the United States, Oxbridge in the UK, and C9 League in China.

It should not be confused with its Anglo-Saxon equivalent, the Master of Management, a master's degree comprising 1 to 2 years of university-level courses in business administration, whereas a French Master in Management (or PGE) generally lasts 3 years.

In 2022, the Commission d'évaluation des formations et diplômes de gestion counted 83 accredited and evaluated PGEs out of 184 degree courses (PGEs and other courses). They are generally listed among the Master in Management programmes in French and international rankings, including the one published annually by the Financial Times.

According to French sociologist Pierre-Michel Menger, PGE is the "most prestigious" degree in initial training in management and administration in France, awarded by the Grandes Écoles, which form a "closed and highly hierarchical" oligopoly of thirty to forty schools. In general in France, a degree awarded by a public or private Grande École is more prestigious than a degree awarded by a university in the mainstream French public university system.

It is an Accredited Diploma, one of two Grande École diplomas, along with the Engineer's Diploma.

== History ==
In 1991, the École supérieure de commerce de Lille, now Skema Business School, was the first to offer its PGE in continuing education.

In 2002, the licence-master-doctorat reform, part of the Bologna Process, enabled the grandes écoles, including the business schools (ESC), to award a master's degree on behalf of the French Government, at the same time as a PGE giving entitlement to it. According to French sociologist Marianne Blanchard, this reform has contributed "to the privatisation of higher education and the weakening of the traditional French public university", removing their monopoly on awarding university degrees in France. A commission was set up to evaluate business schools wishing to obtain the degree: the Commission d'évaluation des formations et diplômes de gestion (in English: "Commission for the evaluation of management courses and diplomas"). A set of specifications defining the criteria to be taken into account when examining an application for a degree to confer the university grade of Master was published in 2014 and updated in 2020.

In the 2010s, business schools (in French: Écoles Supérieures de Commerce, or ESCs) are experiencing particularly rapid growth, having been on a growth trajectory since the 1980s. They are increasing the number of students in their traditional training programme, known at the time as the ‘Grande École program’ or PGE, and developing new programmes. According to French sociologist Marianne Blanchard, the PGE is the main growth driver for these schools.

== Admissions ==
For their Masters in Management (Grande École programs), the French business schools recruit their students from two-year classes préparatoires in economics and business, formerly known as ‘HEC preparatory classes’ or EC, the first of which were created in 1920. After the baccalauréat, students are selected by the lycées offering these preparatory classes on the basis of their ‘academic merit’. In the 2015-2016 academic year, more than 20,000 students were enrolled in these courses.

The students are then distributed hierarchically between the different schools, which recruit them on the basis of a common competitive entrance exam, or common test bank:

- the BCE competitive entrance examination, or ‘Banque commune d'épreuves’, giving access to the PGEs of 18 business schools such as HEC Paris, ESSEC, ESCP, EDHEC, Emlyon and Grenoble School of Management;
- the Ecricome competitive entrance exam, giving access to the PGEs of five business schools, including Neoma Business School, Kedge Business School, Rennes School of Business, Montpellier Business School and EM Strasbourg Business School.

In 2020, 10,232 students from business and economics preparatory classes were registered for the BCE and Ecricome competitive entrance exams (excluding parallel admissions and post-bac).

== Opportunities ==
In 2018, 77.7% of 2018 graduates of a PGE (French Master in Management) from a business school were in employment, a rate five points higher than the employment rate for engineering schools in the same year, according to an integration survey published by the Conférence des grandes écoles (CGE). These conditions for professional integration (speed in finding a first job, salary, proportion of permanent contracts, etc.) are generally considered to be particularly favourable.

== See also ==
- Master of Management
- Master's degree (France)
- Doctor of Management
- Master of Business Administration
- Bachelor of Management Studies
