= Raymond-Alain Thietart =

French business school professor (born 1944)

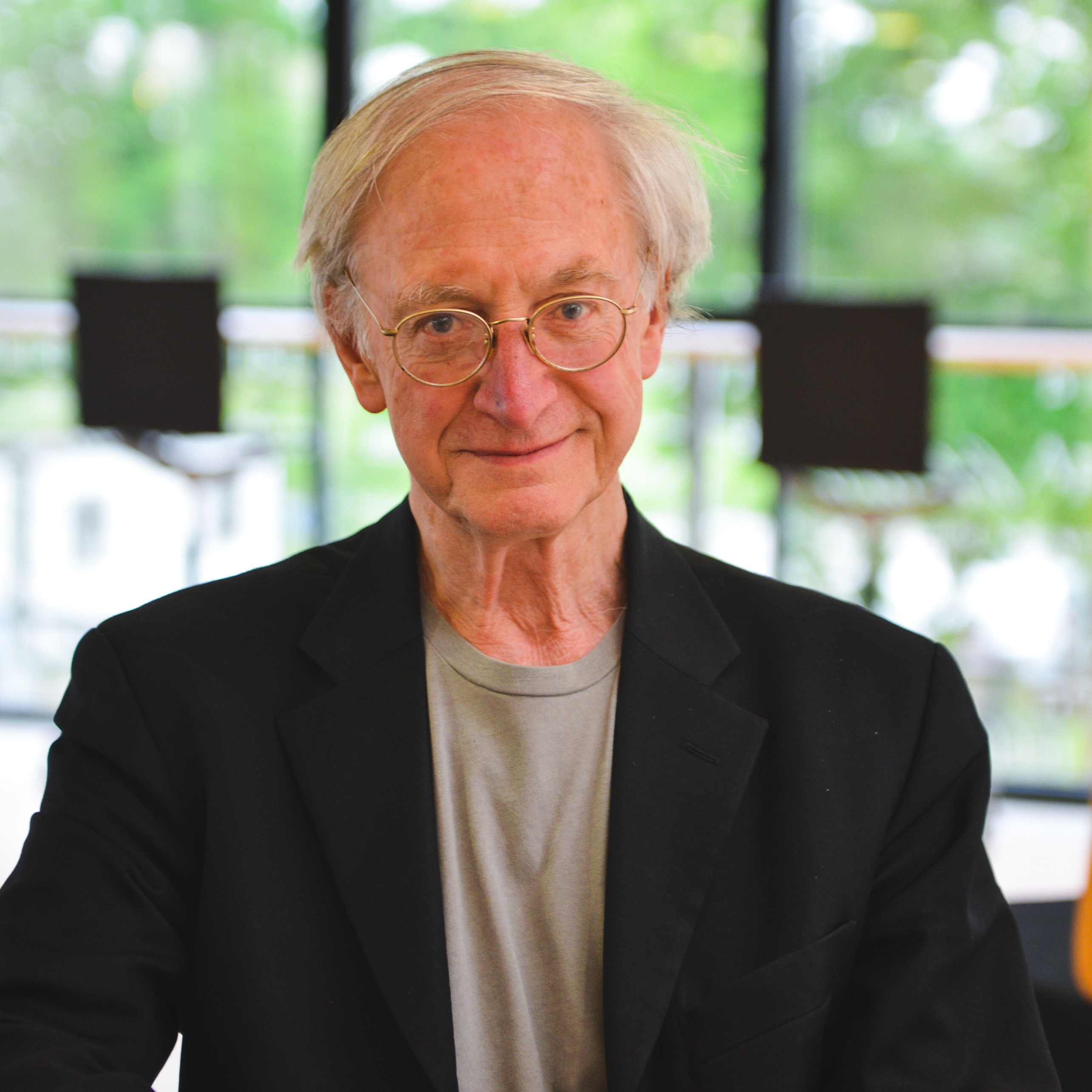
- Born: Raymond-Alain Thietart; 14 January 1944 (age 82); Nice, France
- Education: l’Institut National des Sciences Appliquées de Lyon (1967), l’Ecole Supérieure des Sciences Economiques et Commerciales (1969) et Columbia University(M. Phil et PhD. 1974)

Raymond-Alain Thietart (born 14 January 1944 in Nice, France) is a French business school professor. He is the author of eight books on strategy and management and over a hundred articles in the same field. His research and teaching focus on organization theory and strategic management.

== Biography ==
=== Education ===
Raymond-Alain Thietart graduated in electrical engineering from Institut National des Sciences Appliquées de Lyon (1967) and is also an alumnus of Ecole Supérieure des Sciences Economiques et Commerciales (1969). He received his PhD from Columbia University in 1974.

=== Professional career ===
Raymond-Alain Thietart is distinguished professor of management at ESSEC Business School (Paris-Singapore) since 2007 and a Fellow of the Academy of Management. In the past, he has been a professor of management at the universities of Caen Normandie (1979–1981), Paris Ouest Nanterre La Défense (1981–1984, 1985–1988) and Paris Dauphine (1988–2007). He has also been a visiting professor at the Sloan School of Management at MIT (1984–1985), and an affiliate professor at the European Institute for Advanced Studies in Management (1978–1982).

Raymond Thietart is a part of the generation of French research professors in Management trained in the US in the early 1970s through the funding support of FNEGE (Fondation Nationale pour l’Enseignement de la Gestion des Entreprises) and the Ford Foundation as part of its "European Doctoral Fellows in Management Education". On his return from the US, where he was a Ford Foundation Fellow and Fulbright Scholar, he devoted a large part of his academic activities to the training of young researchers in Management. He has supervised 35 dissertations and research qualification theses. He has also coordinated doctoral training in several educational institutions, including the one in "Marketing and Strategy" of Université Paris-Dauphine (1988–2007) and the PhD program of ESSEC (2007–2012). Furthermore, he has organized seminars and workshops on doctoral research in France at CEFAG (European Centre for Advanced Training in Management), which he ran from 2001 to 2004 and in Brussels, with Igor Ansoff, within the EIASM (European Institute of Advanced Studies in Management). Alongside his activities of training young scientists, his scientific activities bring together the organization, dissemination and creation of knowledge.

In the area of knowledge organization, he has served in the Council of TIMS (The Institute of Management Science), from 1986 to 1988 (now INFORMS), one of the largest international associations in the field of Management Science. In 1993, he co-founded, with Michel Berry and Jean-Claude Thoenig, the Paris School of Management, a think tank organization, of which he was a vice president until 2000. In 2001, he was elected as the president of AIMS, an association of French-speaking researchers in strategy and management.

In the field of dissemination of knowledge, he actively participates in the editorial boards of journals :Organization Science (where he was senior editor from 1994 to 1998), the Strategic Management Journal (where he has been involved in since its creation in 1980) and the Revue Française de Gestion (where he was part of the editorial board till 2015). In addition, he has been sitting on the boards of Entreprises et Histoire, Long Range Planning, the Canadian Journal of Administrative Sciences, Strategic Organization, Journal of Strategy and Management, Harvard-L’Expansion and M@n@gement. M@n@gement is the first open -access electronic journal in management research, founded by Bernard Forgues, V. Perret and Sandra Charreire. Professor Thietart helped developing the journal in 1997 (along with William H. Starbuck and Andrew Pettigrew who were part of the first "advisory board"). Finally, he also ran a book series for McGraw-Hill in the area of strategy and management.

With respect to knowledge creation, Raymond-Alain Thietart has contributed to the study of complex dynamic systems (Human Dynamics, chaotic organizational processes, strategy dynamics ), forms of effective strategies according to their context (life cycle, decline, diversification ), strategic decision making process (decision analyses, mixed strategy, role of chance and determinism in strategic decision making, inter-relational dynamics, role of information), management of organisations( managers, mutual organisation, management of innovation, outsourcing, strategy and structure), research methods.

== Academic contributions ==
=== Complex dynamic systems ===
==== Human dynamics ====
In 1971, while working on his PhD thesis at Columbia University, under the supervision of Martin K. Starr (for modeling), William H. Newman(for management) and Noel Tichy (for individual behavior), Professor Thietart proposed a ‘human model’ in the professional work context. His work extended that of the System Dynamics Group at MIT founded in the early sixties by Jay W. Forrester. His model was based on the general theory of systems and the simulation programs were written in DYNAMO (programming language). His model of human-system is made of five subsystems in interaction. The subsystems are 1 / the motivation subsystem, 2 / the satisfaction subsystem, 3 / the learning subsystem 4 / the decision subsystem and, 5 / the performance subsystem. Each of these sub-systems is composed of multiple loops of action and feedback. The simulation is performed in a work context in which man is subjected to various types of control. Although richer and more complex than previous representations of individual behavior, ‘the man’ of Thietart nevertheless remains a determined man, as recalled by Jacques Lesourne in the preface of the book “la dynamique de l’homme au travail” published in 1977. Though not followed extensively, the book has nevertheless been an important contribution to the scientific representation of man in a work context.

==== Chaotic organization ====
According to Thietart and Forgues, organizational processes (decision-making, innovation, crisis) are potentially chaotic. It is the coupling of stabilizing forces (control, planning, and structure) and destabilizing forces (individual initiative, innovation, risk taking) that produces under certain conditions, chaos in organizations. Chaos, in their writings is not a metaphorical term, but is grounded in mathematics. (Note: . In a situation of chaos, induced by tight coupling between forces of stability and instability, forecasting becomes impossible except for the very short term.) Also, replication of successful practices of the past is, at best, ineffective for the future. Finally, similar behaviors should be observed at different levels (scales) of the organization. Forces in play are functional to the extent that the destabilizing ones push the organization towards change and prepare it for an unknown future. Forces that push the organization towards order help in making sense of organized action. The challenge of management then lies in finding a balance between these opposing forces. Managerial recommendations of this research underscore the need to proceed step by step in the face of unpredictability, to encourage experimentation that renders the organization ready when the future reveals itself and to rely on dialectic methods to question current organizational practices.

==== Strategic dynamics ====
In this line of research, Professor Thietart addresses a central strategic question: namely, can leaders choose the timing of their strategic action? He challenges the idea that the time for strategic action and consequently its dynamics is controlled by the "strategist". On the basis of an in-depth study of a company over a period of forty two years, Thietart shows that although the "strategist" (the agent) is partly responsible for the dynamics, over time, strategy and its evolution of strategy are to a large extent self-organized, anchored in the past and impacted by chance. His results challenge the idea that strategic action and particularly its temporal nature could be attributed to the deliberate choice of the leader. He shows that the evolution of the strategy is the result of a complex combination of will, chance, determinism and self-organization. In his conclusion, he suggests that with the exception of periods of great stability, the strategist has little direct control over when to act. The strategist may choose the content of his/her strategy and the sequence of actions but not when to act. It is through the organization of his/her actions that he/she might have an influence on the overall dynamics of the strategy. The greater the degree of organization of the strategist's actions, the greater is the stability of the strategy dynamics. An intermediate degree of organization, meanwhile, favors the phenomena of emergence while the lack of organization leads to disorder.

=== Strategic movements ===
==== Life cycle ====
The idea that appropriate company strategies depend on where a company is in its life cycle is not recent. However, Thietart and Vivas show that previous research on this idea is fragmented and prescriptive. To remedy this, they evaluated the relative effectiveness of different strategies for more than 1100 activities depending on the phase of their life cycle (growth, maturity, and decline). They show that successful strategies at these different phases differ and depend on the pursued objective (long or short term). Their research supports the idea that a good match between internal capacity and competitive environment is required.

==== Outsourcing ====
Thietart and Jain address two important issues in outsourcing: 1 / decision to make or buy, 2 / competitive dynamics between companies and its impact on the outsourcing decision. With respect to the first issue, they show that a company's strategic capability changes the threshold at which an outsourcing decision is made. Due to the specific capabilities of some companies, the boundary between governance by the market and that of the hierarchy is changed. They suggest this as a way to seamlessly integrate the theories of Resource-based view and Transaction cost. For the second issue, they explore the competitive dynamic between companies and its impact on outsourcing decisions. Through a computer simulation of competing companies, they show that outsourcing implemented by a company influences the relative performance of other companies, thereby initiating a succession (a cascade) of outsourcing decisions.

==== Decline and revitalization ====
According to Thietart, corporate decline is not inevitable. A company can, even in a declining situation, continue to create value. He shows that the strategies for declining industries and their revitalization are based on the aimed objective (growth or profit). They are also based on an adequate balance between strategic positioning of the company and its competitive environment. He stresses that the traditional measures of downsizing are not the only solutions. Companies must instead rely on their unique abilities to adopt a differentiated positioning that meets the constraints of their environment and therein rests on a good strategy.

=== Strategic decision making ===
==== Chance, choice, inevitability ====
Thietart and De Rond claim that the belief in freedom of strategic choice is necessary because to motivate choice, one must believe that choice makes a difference. However, there is a chance that questioning the scope of that choice may open up new possibilities for future actions. Strategic choice is not enough to drive strategy. Choice, like chance is a contributing, but not the only factor that drives strategy. A determining causal context is needed to interpret and leverage results offered by random occurrences. So, strategy is to be made of choice, chance and inevitability induced by external and internal constraints to which it is subject.

==== Strategic Mix ====
Thietart suggests that strategy formation does not originate from a rational, logical and deductive approach only. Strategy formation is the product of several processes -rational, organizational and political – that interact according to their respective strengths. The conventional approaches of strategic planning focus on a rational process. However, there is also an organizational process that relies on the means and resources that are mobilized. Finally, there is a political process that forces organizational actors pursuing different objectives to negotiate. The result is a "mix" of different approaches, without which the best strategy on paper will have a short life and will never be implemented.

==== Inter-relational dynamics ====
Thietart and Bergadaà propose a process of strategy formation through a digitized and decentralized network, the objective of which is to facilitate strategic decision making and its implementation. The process is based on the dynamic interaction between actors linked by a network of computers through which they communicate and collectively build a strategy. The process not only takes advantage of structured approaches to strategic decision making, but also underscores the natural communication processes that exist within organizations. It also uses conflict as a source of creativity while seeking consensus to facilitate future implementation of strategy. Finally, it allows everyone to act according to their perceived role.

==== Strategic Information ====
Under the assumption that information on the competitive environment is crucial, Thietart and Vivas focus on an often neglected resource for acquiring this information – vendors and sales people who are in contact with customers Their focus is built on the fact that more than any other feature, it is the speed of communication which makes the difference between a missed and a seized opportunity. Based on a sample of sales persons of a large industrial company, Thietart and Vivas emphasize trust, training and participation in communicating adequate information. Vendors and sales people are uniquely positioned between the company and its environment and they constitute an effective communication channel. They stress the importance of using these too often untapped human resources as a source of strategic information.

=== Management of organizations ===
==== Management ====
Thietart defines management as "A set of intentions (planning)-transformed into action by a bureaucracy (the organization), its actors (activation) and regulated by a control system (control).” He further adds that, "A manager [...] must implement the technical, financial and human resources to accomplish its task and achieve the objectives of [the organization]". For him there are not 5 functions—as posited by Henri Fayol—but four: planning, organization, activation, control, which puts him in the Anglo-Saxon tradition.

==== Managers and Shareholders ====
Thietart, studying the tension between the interests of shareholders and those of managers, shows how to achieve a balance between managers and controlling shareholders. As part of the theories of agency and transaction cost economics, he highlights, in a longitudinal study of more than sixty years of a major French company in the IT sector, the link between types of control and ownership structure.

==== Mutual Organization ====
For Thietart and Koenig one of the challenges of strategic alliances between firms is their management. They highlight patterns of behavior observed in successful alliances and compare them to the patterns of behaviour of alliances facing major management problems. They do so in the context of y co-operation over time between firms in the European aeronautics sector. They find an original form of successful cooperation which they call ‘mutual organization’. Airbus and ESRO (European Space Research Organization) cooperation at its inception is a perfect illustration of this form of cooperation.

==== Innovation Management ====
In this field, Thietart has explored two topics. The first study with Horwitch focuses on the identification of links that should exist between "high tech" activities. This is to address the problem of interdependence or independence of activities and to determine when an activity must be tightly controlled or should be left autonomous. The research is based on the study of two hundred fifty high-tech activities. The second study, with Xuereb, deals with cognitive processes: bureaucratic, strategic, and organizational that a firm implements to manage the complexity and uncertainty inherent to innovation projects. These processes, they say, are intended to draw boundaries to a complex system that would allow actors within the system to operate rationally. The research is based on the analyses of about twenty innovation processes and two hundred innovative projects.

==== Strategy and Management ====
One of the conditions for strategy to succeed, according to Thietart and Horovitz, is its proper alignment with the management system that supports it. In a study of fifty diversified and non-diversified businesses, they highlight the necessary link between diversification strategies and management systems. Management systems are defined as being composed of the organization, planning, control and activation ("staffing" and "directing").

=== Research methods ===
==== Inter-disciplinary approaches ====
“Méthodes de Recherche en Management” (Doing Management Research, in its English adaptation) is a book on research methods. It is the result of a collaboration between Thietart (acting as coordinator) and a score of doctoral students, all of whom went ahead to hold academic positions in universities in France and abroad. The project started from the premise that doing management research does not imply following a linear trajectory but rather a trajectory that incorporated feedback between an intuition, exploration and implementation. Drawing on the expertise of each author, but through a collective process of self-criticism, the book aims to help the reader/researcher facing a problem with the methodological tools they may need.

==== Historical Approaches ====
Thietart and Marmonier advocate better interaction between historical research methods and management research. They show how rigorous historical method can contribute significantly to the study of the management processes. They also suggest that history as a memory of organizations could prove to be a rich source of data to better understand organizations evolution.
