= Jean-Luc Vayssière =

French professor

- Born: 1956 (age 69–70)
- Education: Doctorate in Biochemistry
- Alma mater: Paris Diderot University
- Occupation: President of the Versailles Saint-Quentin-en-Yvelines University from 12 April 2012 until April 2016
- Employer: Versailles Saint-Quentin-en-Yvelines University
- Predecessor: Sylvie Faucheux
- Successor: Didier Guillemot

Jean-Luc Vayssière (born in 1956) is a French professor, specializing in genetics and cell biology. He has been president of Versailles Saint-Quentin-en-Yvelines University from April 2012 to 2016.

== Biography ==
=== Training ===
Jean-Luc Vayssière was trained in biochemistry at Paris Diderot University. He received his doctorate in the molecular biology of eukaryotic organisms in the same university. On 9 April 2001, he qualified to manage research, cellular and molecular aspects of apoptosis, at Versailles Saint-Quentin-en-Yvelines University.

=== Academic career ===
He was hired as assistant at the Collège de France in 1990. In 1994, he became lecturer at the Versailles Saint-Quentin-en-Yvelines University. In 2001, he is appointed head of training at the École pratique des hautes études before entering in 2006 as teacher at the Versailles Saint-Quentin-en-Yvelines University. Alongside his teaching activities, he is a researcher at the Laboratory of Genetics and Cell Biology, responsible of the "stress and cell death" team.

=== Political activities ===
He was a member of the Conseil national des universités (National Council of Universities) (section 65) from 2003 to 2007, and chief of staff at UVSQ from 2004 to 2008. He was Vice Chairman of the Board of directors of the University from 2008 to 2012.

=== President of the Versailles Saint-Quentin-en-Yvelines University ===
In April 2012, he became president of Versailles Saint-Quentin-en-Yvelines University, succeeding Sylvie Faucheux.

He was replaced by Didier Guillemot in May 2016.

== Distinction ==
- Legion of Honour
