= Alain Bui =

French academic

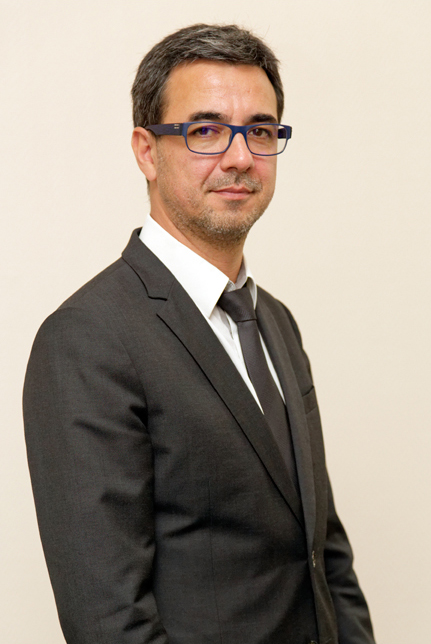
- Born: 1969 (age 56–57); France
- Education: Paris Diderot University; Paris 8 University
- Occupation: President of the Versailles Saint-Quentin-en-Yvelines University Since October 2017
- Predecessor: Didier Guillemot

Alain Bui (born in 1969) is a French academic who is specialized in information technology, and is the current president of Versailles Saint-Quentin-en-Yvelines University.

== Biography ==
=== Training ===
Alain Bui was trained in information technology at Paris Diderot University. In 1999, he qualified to manage research at Paris 8 University.

=== Academic career ===
Bui started his career as senior lecturer at the University of Picardie Jules Verne from 1995 to 1999, before becoming a teacher at the University of Reims Champagne-Ardenne. In 2003, Bui joined the French National Centre for Scientific Research as the Head of the Simulation Department. He was the Head of the Prims Laboratory between 2013 and 2015. At UVSQ, he was the international relationship director from 2012 to 2016, then Vice-President from 2016 to 2017.

He is the author of more than 60 scientific publications.

=== Political activities ===
He is member of the Haut Conseil de l'évaluation de la recherche et de l'enseignement supérieur and of the Agence nationale de la recherche. From 2011 to 2016, he was also the member of the Conseil national des universités.

=== President of the Versailles Saint-Quentin-en-Yvelines University ===
In October 2017, he became president of Versailles Saint-Quentin-en-Yvelines University, succeeding Didier Guillemot.
