= Didier Guillemot =

French physician and researcher (born 1960)

- Born: Guillemot; 1960 (age 65–66)
- Education: Paris Diderot University
- Occupation: President of the Versailles Saint-Quentin-en-Yvelines University from May 2016 to September 2017
- Predecessor: Jean-Luc Vayssière
- Successor: Alain Bui

Didier Guillemot (French: [didje ɡijmo]; born in 1960) is a French doctor, specializing in infectious disease. He was president of Versailles Saint-Quentin-en-Yvelines University from May 2016 to September 2017.

== Biography ==
=== Training ===
Didier Guillemot was trained in technological innovation and public health at Paris Diderot University. On 2003, he qualified to manage research at the same university.

=== Academic career ===
He is scientific researcher at Inserm from 1994 to 2000, and then research Director at the Institut Pasteur from 2001 to 2007. After having worked on the HIV, he is Head of the Biostatistics, Biomathematics, Pharmacoepidemiology and Infectious Diseases laboratory at UVSQ.

=== Political activities ===
He is member of the Haute Autorité en Santé, of the Agence Nationale de Sécurité du Médicament et des Produits de Santé and of the Institut de veille sanitaire.

=== President of the Versailles Saint-Quentin-en-Yvelines University ===
In May 2016, he became president of Versailles Saint-Quentin-en-Yvelines University, succeeding Jean-Luc Vayssière. He resigned his contract in September 2017 due to long-term sick leave.
