= Sylvie Faucheux =

University president

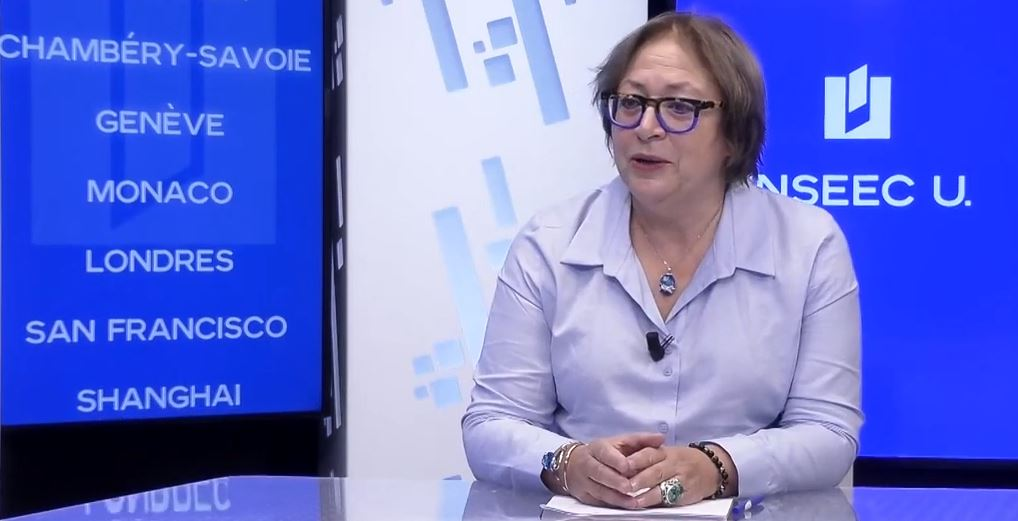
- Born: Sylvie Faucheux; 29 May 1960 (age 66); Paris, France
- Citizenship: French
- Education: University of Paris 1 Pantheon-Sorbonne
- Occupation: professor
- Known for: Former president of Versailles Saint-Quentin-en-Yvelines University Director of Academic Research and Innovation at the Research Centre of INSEEC (OMNES Education)
- Predecessor: Dominique Gentile
- Successor: Jean-Luc Vayssière

Sylvie Faucheux (born 29 May 1960, in Paris) is a French professor, specializing in the economy of the natural environment and sustainable development. President of the Versailles Saint-Quentin-en-Yvelines University (UVSQ) from 2002 till April 2012, she is the current president of Université du grand ouest parisien, Professor at the French National Conservatory of Arts and Crafts (Le CNAM) from 2014 until 2017, and was Director of Academic Research and Innovation at the Research Centre of INSEEC (OMNES Education) from 2017 until 2022.

== Biography ==
=== Training ===
She studied economics and econometrics at the Paris 1 Pantheon-Sorbonne University in 1990 before defending her doctoral thesis in environmental economics and natural resources at the same university.

=== Academic career ===
Only a young graduate, she was hired as a lecturer at the Paris 1 Pantheon-Sorbonne University in 1991. A few months later, she became a teacher at the University of Maine before being appointed professor at the Versailles Saint-Quentin-en-Yvelines University in 1994, a position she still holds. In 1995 she founded and managed the Center for Economics and Ethics Environment and Sustainable Development, which became in 2002 a joint research unit between UVSQ and the Institut de Recherche Pour le Développement (IRD) (Institute of Development Research).

=== Political activities ===
She is also behind the founding partnership Fondaterra (Institut Européen Pour le Développement Durable). She chaired the European Association for Ecological Economics from 1994 to 1998 before becoming a board member of the International Society for Ecological Economics. From 1994 to 2001, she was a member of the European Consultative Forum on Environment and Sustainable Development for the European presidency. Then she took responsibility of the working group on climate change. Next to her academic activities, she was a Socialist Party candidate at the parliamentary elections for the first district of Yvelines in June 2007.

=== President of the Versailles University ===
In December 2002, she was named president of the Versailles Saint-Quentin-en-Yvelines University. She was named again in 2008 until 12 April 2012, when Jean-Luc Vayssière succeeded her. In addition to its core business, she is a member of the Board of Research and Higher Education in France since 2002 and responsible, within it, of the working group on sustainable development. She is also part of the scientific board of Cemagref since 2001.

== Awards ==
Sylvie Faucheux is a chevalier of the Ordre des Palmes Académiques (promoted 14 July 2004), a member of the Ordre national du Mérite (decreed 14 November 2005), a chevalier of the Legion of Honour and holder of the Marianne d'Or 2009 for her actions in favor of the sustainable development.

== Bibliography ==
- Sylvie Faucheux, Jean-François Noël, Économie des ressources naturelles et de l'environnement, Armand Colin, 1999, 320 p. (ISBN 2200214421)
- Sylvie Faucheux, H. Joumni, Économie des changements climatiques, La découverte - slf, 2005, 128 p. (ISBN 2707143820)
- Sylvie Faucheux, Catherine Moulin, T.I.C. et développement durable, De Boeck, 2010 (ISBN 2804103714)
