= Bloomberg Aptitude Test =

Bloomberg Aptitude Test

The Bloomberg Aptitude Test (BAT) was an aptitude test owned, published, and developed by the now-defunct Bloomberg Institute - a former educational division of Bloomberg LP. It was used by employers in the business world to evaluate candidates. The exam focused on skills relevant to careers in finance. The exam was administered in 58 countries on university campuses.

It was first introduced as the Bloomberg Assessment Test, then changed to the Bloomberg Aptitude Test in 2013. It is now discontinued. Bloomberg offers a fee-based, self-paced e-learning course called Bloomberg Market Concepts that can only be administered on a Bloomberg terminal.

== Background and Scoring ==
The BAT was first introduced in 2010 as a three-hour exam. In 2013, the test kept the same scoring format but was shortened to a two-hour, 100 multiple choice question test. The test was scored on a scale of 100 points, with an average score of 55. There was also percentile ranking for additional comparisons. No one ever got a perfect score. The BAT had 8 sections: News Analysis (12 questions), Economics (12 questions), Math Skills (14 questions), Analytical Reasoning (12 questions), Financial Statements Analysis (12 questions), Investment Banking (12 questions), Global Markets (14 questions), and Chart and Graph Analysis (12 questions).

== Campus Proctoring ==
The Bloomberg Aptitude Test was taken on university campuses only, through the Bloomberg Ambassador program. The test was free to take and required no preparation.
