= National Active Non-Commissioned Officers School (France) =

Coordinates: 46.4158°N 0.2131°W

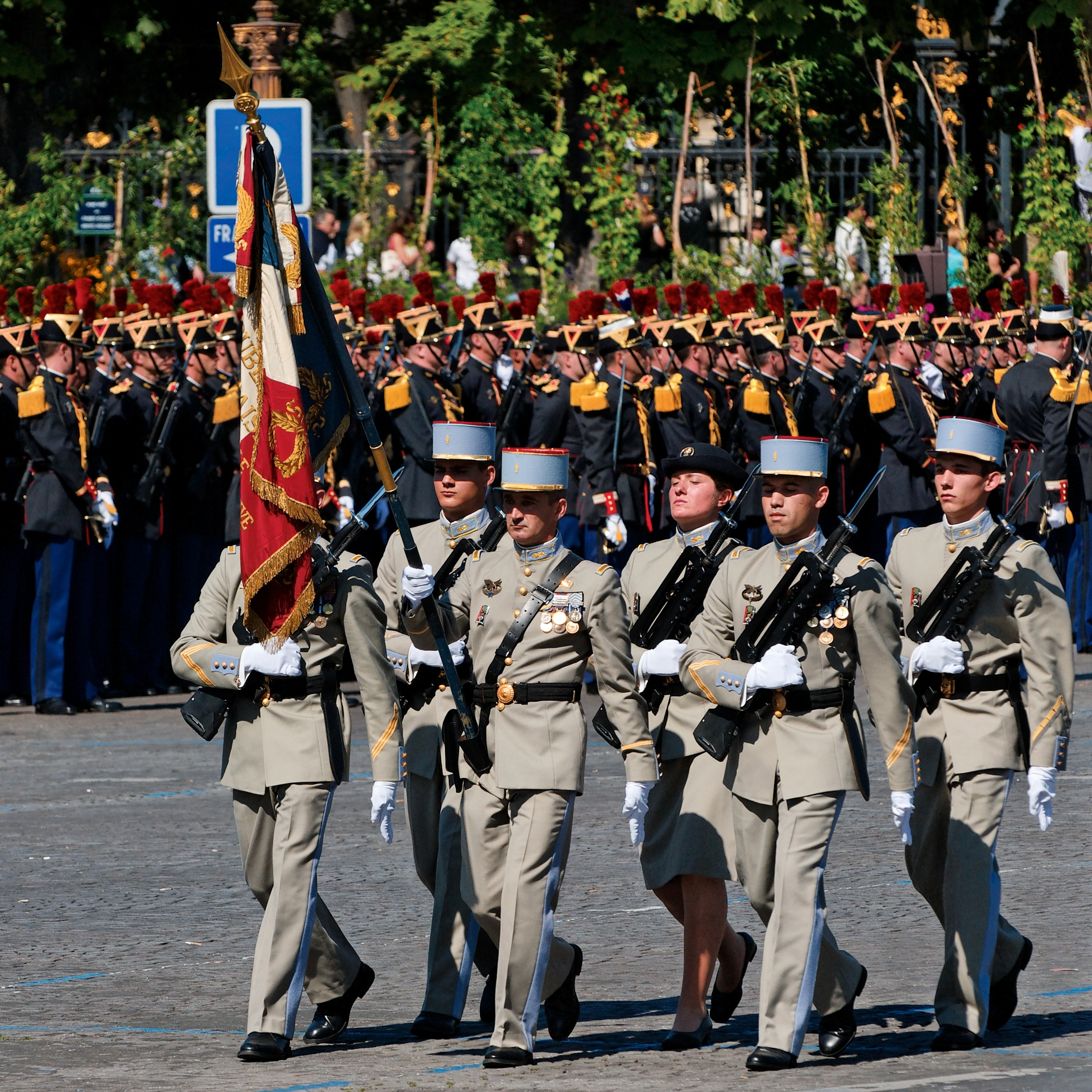
ENSOA at the Bastille Day Military Parade.

National Active Non-Commissioned Officers School (French: École Nationale des Sous-Officiers d’Active, ENSOA) is a general military school created by the French Army in 1963 to train career NCOs (Sous-Officiers) on active service. It is a reorganization of the previous Saint-Maixent NCO School.

As of 2006, the ENSOA also trains reserve NCOs for both initial (squad leader) and higher-level (platoon leader) functions. The first reserve promotion sessions were held in July 2006. Contrary to active NCO training which lasts 8 months for new recruits or 4 months for senior enlisted soldiers, reserve NCO training is composed of two two-weeks sessions (one two-weeks session for senior reserve enlisted soldiers).
