= Commission d'évaluation des formations et diplômes de gestion =

The Commission d'évaluation des formations et diplômes de gestion (CEFDG, in English National Commission for the Evaluation of Training and Qualifications in Management) was created by Decree number 2001-295 on 4 April 2001, in order to give master's degree accreditation to French business schools. The CEFDG includes 16 members from the Ministry of National Education and one from Economy.

The master's degree accreditation is valid for a maximum of six years, after the evaluation process.

== See also ==
- Commission des Titres d'Ingénieur
- Conférence des Grandes Écoles
