= Fondation nationale pour l'enseignement de la gestion =

French foundation

The Fondation nationale pour l'enseignement de la gestion des entreprises (National Foundation for Business Management Education), best known by its acronym FNEGE is a French foundation for the development and involvement of academic education in all management fields. Founded in 1968, FNEGE is managed and funded both by public authorities and large French companies.

The Revue Française de Gestion is published by the FNEGE.

Its current president (as of October 2007) is Jean-Marie Descarpentries, former CEO of Carnaud Metalbox, Groupe Bull and Ingenico.

== See also ==
- European Foundation for Management Development (EFMD)
- Association to Advance Collegiate Schools of Business (AACSB)
