= Graziano =

Graziano is both a masculine Italian given name and a surname. Notable people with the name include:

== Given name ==
- Graziano Battistini (1936–1994), Italian professional road bicycle racer
- Graziano Battistini (footballer) (born 1970), Italian football goalkeeper
- Graziano Boscacci (born 1969), Italian ski mountaineer
- Graziano Calvaresi (born 1966), Italian former long-distance runner
- Graziano Cecchini (born 1953), Italian artist and activist, known for his works of "vandalism" art
- Graziano Cioni (born 1946), Italian politician
- Graziano Delrio (born 1960), Italian mayor and politician
- Graziano Di Prima (born 1994), Sicilian/Italian dancer
- Graziano Gasparini (1924–2019), Venezuelan architect and architectural historian
- Graziano Gasparre (born 1978), Italian former cyclist
- Graziano Girardi (born 1940), Italian politician
- Graziano Mancinelli (1937–1992), Italian show jumping rider
- Graziano Mesina (1942–2025), Sardinian bandit
- Graziano Origa (20th century), Italian comics artist
- Graziano Pellè (born 1985), Italian football (soccer) striker
- Graziano Rossi (born 1954), Italian former Grand Prix motorcycle road racer
- Graziano Salvietti (born 1956), Italian former professional racing cyclist
- Graziano Santucci, O.S.A. (died 1517), Italian Roman Catholic bishop of Alatri

=== Fictional ===
- Graziano, kinsman to Brabantio in Shakespeare's Othello

== Surname ==
- Anthony Graziano (1940–2019), Italian-American mobster
- Bob Graziano (21st century), American baseball executive
- Claudio Graziano (born 1953), Italian Army officer who serves as Chairman of the European Union Military Committee
- David Graziano (born 1972), American screenwriter and producer
- Giovanni Graziano (born 1995), Italian professional footballer
- Guido di Graziano (also known as Guido of Siena), Italian painter in a Byzantine style, active during the 13th-century in Siena
- Guillermo Wagner Granizo (1923–1995) American ceramist and muralist
- Ilaria Graziano (21st century), Italian singer and vocalist
- José Graziano da Silva (born 1949), American-born Brazilian agronomist and Director General of the FAO
- Leonardo Graziano (born 1975), Italian voice actor
- Manlio Graziano, Italian scholar specializing in geopolitics and geopolitics of religions
- Matteo Graziano (born 2001), Argentine rugby player
- Mino di Graziano (1289–1323), Italian painter, active in Siena
- Renee Graziano (born 1968), American reality television personality and author
- Ricardo Graziano (born 1986), Brazilian ballet dancer and choreographer
- Rocky Graziano (1919–1990), American boxer
- Sal E. Graziano (21st century), Italian professional wrestler
- Michael Graziano (born 1967), American scientist and novelist, professor of psychology and neuroscience at Princeton University

== See also ==
- Graziano Trasmissioni, an Italian company, manufacturer of gearboxes, drivelines and its components
