= Gonnet =

Gonnet is a surname borne by the following:

- Charles Gonnet (1897–1985), French poet
- Dominique Gonnet (born 1950), Belgian Jesuit scholar
- Esteban Gonnet (1829–1868), French-Argentinian photographer
- Gaston Gonnet (born 1948), Canadian computer science professor
- Jean-Baptiste Gonnet (born 1982), French golfer
- Marguerite Gonnet (1898–1996), French resistance leader

- Daniel Blanc-Gonnet (born 1994), American motorcycle trials rider
- Hatice Gonnet-Bağana (born 1832), Turkish archaeologist

== See also ==
- Baeza-Yates-Gonnet algorithm
- Manuel B. Gonnet, city in Argentina
