= Lumière University Lyon 2 =

Public university in Lyon, France

Coordinates: 45°45′03″N 4°50′14″E

- Université Lumière Lyon 2
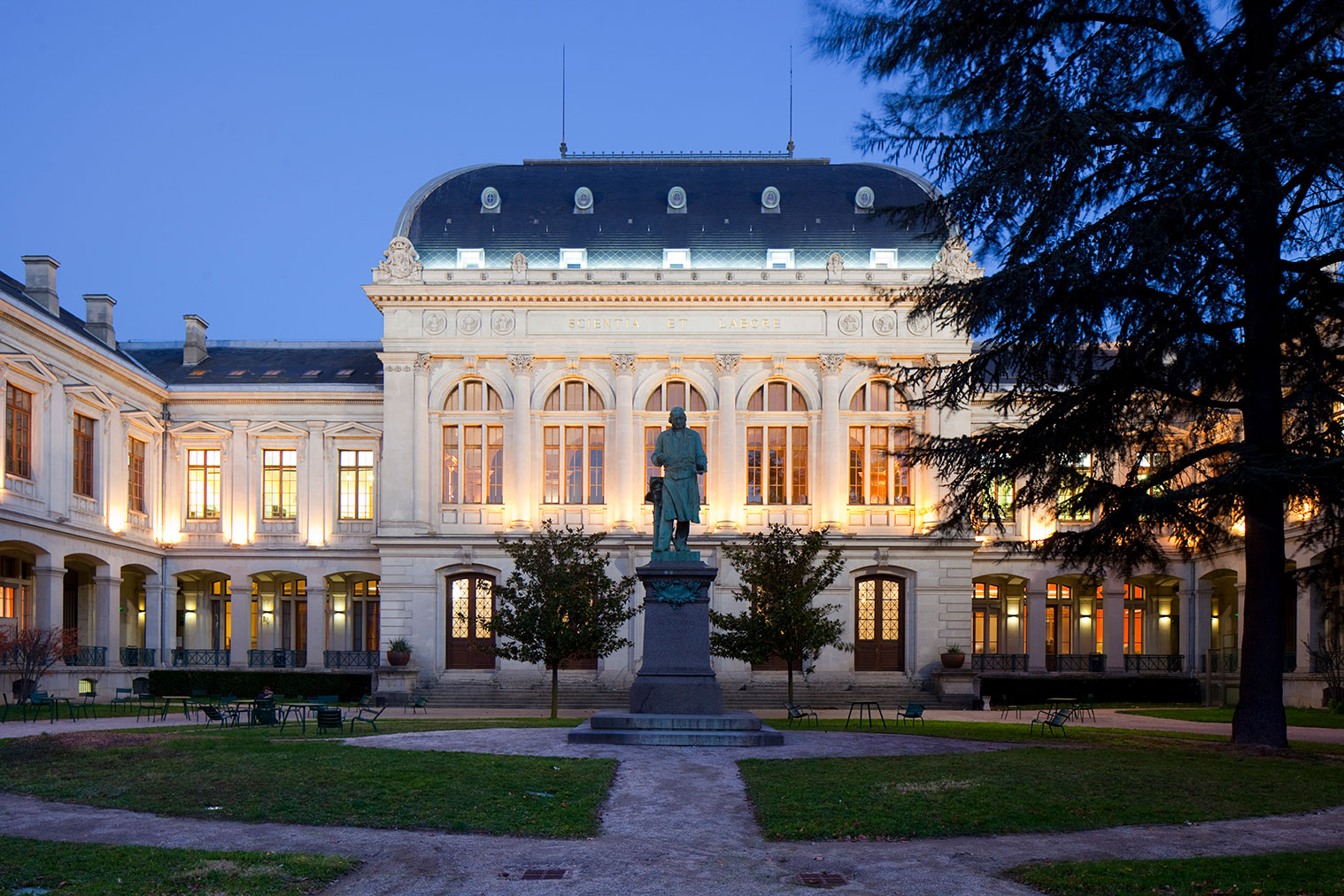
- The Palais Hirsch, one of the university campus in front of the Rhône River.
- Motto: Inter Folia Fulget
- Motto in English: The knowledge between pages
- Type: Public
- Established: 1835
- Affiliations: University of Lyon
- Endowment: €121 M
- President: Isabelle Von Bueltzingsloewen
- Students: 27,393
- Undergraduates: 14,851
- Postgraduates: 7,046
- Doctoral students: 1,355
- Location: 18 quai Claude Bernard, 69365 LYON Cedex 07, Lyon, France
- Campus: Urban
- Website: www.univ-lyon2.fr (In English)

Lumière University Lyon 2 (French: Université Lumière Lyon 2) is one of the three universities that comprise the current University of Lyon system, having splintered from an older university of the same name, and is primarily based on two campuses in Lyon itself. It has a total of 27,500 students studying for three-to-eight-year degrees in the arts, humanities and social sciences.

== History ==
At the end of the 18th century, Lyon did not have a university. Education was still linked to religious congregations and influenced by the town's commercial, scientific and industrial requirements.

- 1835 and 1838 : Creation of the Faculties of Science and Humanities.
- 1874 and 1875 : Creation of the Faculties of Medicine and Law.
- 1896 : All these faculties were combined to form the University of Lyon. The same year, the historical buildings on the left bank of the Rhone were finished, initially dedicated to the faculties of medicine and science, then to the faculties of law and humanities. University of Lyon 2 is now established in part of these buildings.
- December 1969 : University Lyon 2 was created as a result of the Loi Faure of 1968, according to which each university must be a legally independent establishment. It comprised law, humanities and social sciences. The number of students soon rose significantly. In such a demographic context, the university was extended in Bron, where a new campus was built during the 1970s, its original features included a modular organisation, a street within the university and a landscaped environment. For some years now, it has been part of the developing area of Porte des Alpes near Bron.
- 1987 : University Lyon 2 was renamed University Lumière Lyon 2. The logo was created by the Art and Design School of Lyon reflecting the university's new ambitions: offering optimal access to the foundations of culture, promoting initiatives and opening itself to the world.

== Campuses ==
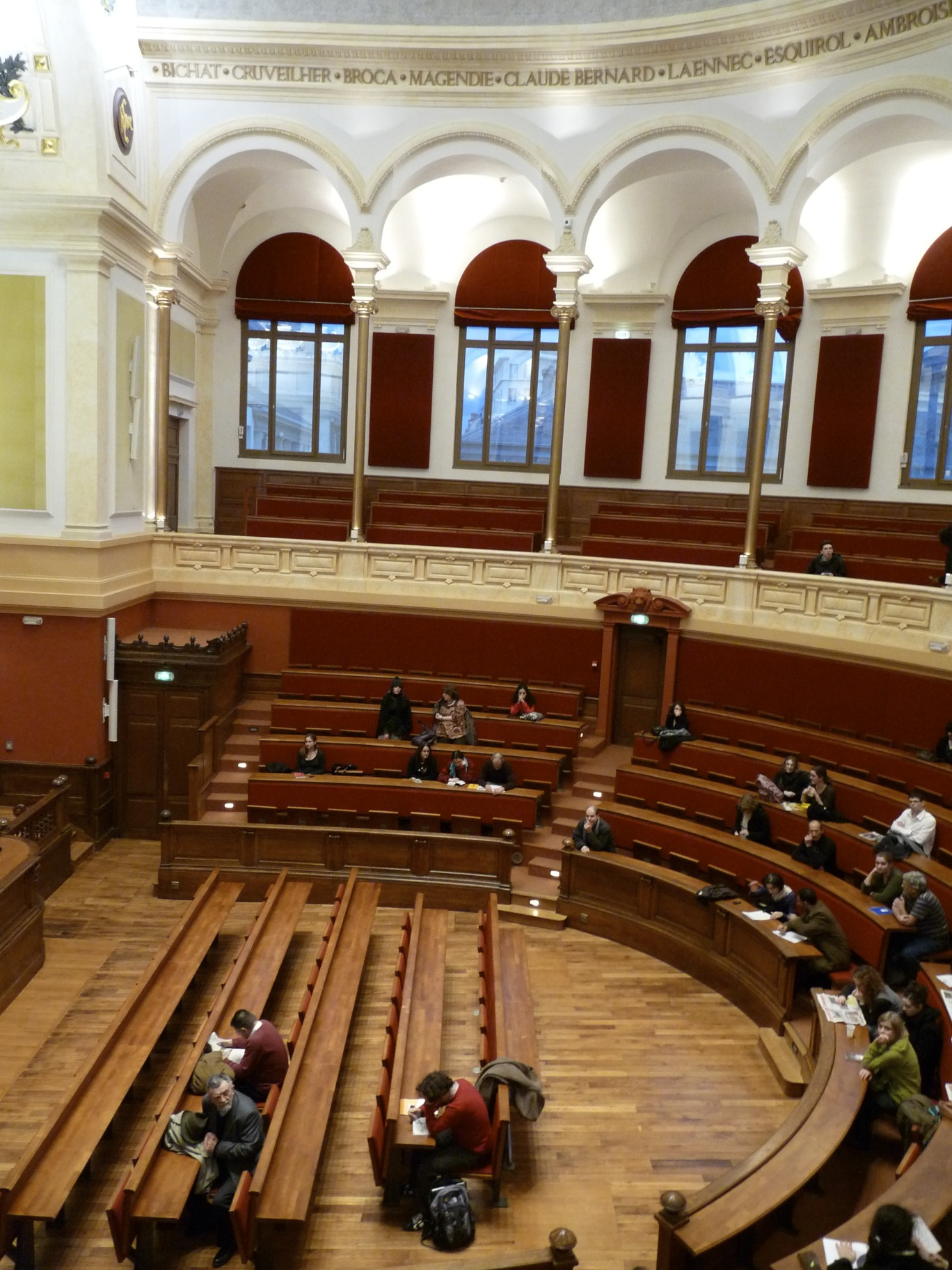
Grand Amphitheatre, Université Lumière Lyon 2

Université Lumière Lyon 2 extends over two main sites:

- Berges du Rhône' campus – a historic site in the centre of Lyon on the left bank of the Rhone, which is also the head office of the university.
- Porte des Alpes, on the south-eastern outskirts of Lyon, in Bron and Saint-Priest which houses the teaching and research premises and the buildings of the polytechnic institute (IUT Lumière) as well as cultural and sports activities.

== Courses ==
Lyon 2 Lumière University is one of the first universities to have integrated the European higher education scheme right from the start of the academic year 2004. The courses are organised within the scope of the LMD' system (Bachelor's degree – Master's degree – PhD). Lyon 2 Lumière University offers a variety of courses in 5 fields:

- Humanities and Social Sciences
  - Languages
  - Foreign Literatures and Culture
  - Applied Modern Languages
  - Performing Arts
  - Information & Communication
  - Latin and Greek
  - Modern Literature
  - Music
  - Psychology
  - Cognitive Sciences
  - Language Sciences
- Society and Environment
  - Public Administration
  - Planning
  - Anthropology
  - Geography
  - History
  - History of Art and Archaeology
  - Education Science
  - Political Sciences
  - Sociology
- Economics and Management
  - Economic and Social Administration
  - Econometrics
  - Economics and Management
- Law
- Data Science and Machine Learning for Social Sciences and Humanities
  - Data Science
  - Machine Learning

== Digital facilities ==
Lyon 2 is part of a pilot program on the intensive use of TICE (ITCE, Information and Communication Technology in Education). The digital work environment (fr. ENT) was introduced at the university in 2003. The Digital Working Environment (ENT) project at Lumière Lyon 2 is part of a national, regional and local drive to accompany, support and assist individuals who make up the academic world (students, lecturers and other university staff) throughout their diverse field of activity; as part of basic training, research, advanced training or simple intellectual curiosity.

The five ENT tool categories include :

- information : 3 portals (administration, staff and students), faculties' Internet sites, Web TV;
- communication : a virtual office for both individual and team work;
- pédagogie : on-line training center;
- documentation : including Encyclopedia Universalis on-line, multi-lingual translator Ultralingua, theoretical resources and library catalogs;
- e-administration : access to various documents such as regulations, marking breakdowns, certificates, career history for staff

University rankings

Global – Overall
- QS World: 1001–1200
- THE World: 1200+

National – Overall
- QS National: 26

== Reputation ==
The university was ranked 26 out of universities in France and in the 1001–1200 band of world universities by QS World University Rankings 2023. It was also ranked 231 in the world for Arts and Humanities. It was similarly ranked by the Times Higher Education World University Rankings 2022.

== Notable professors ==
=== Humanities and Social Sciences ===
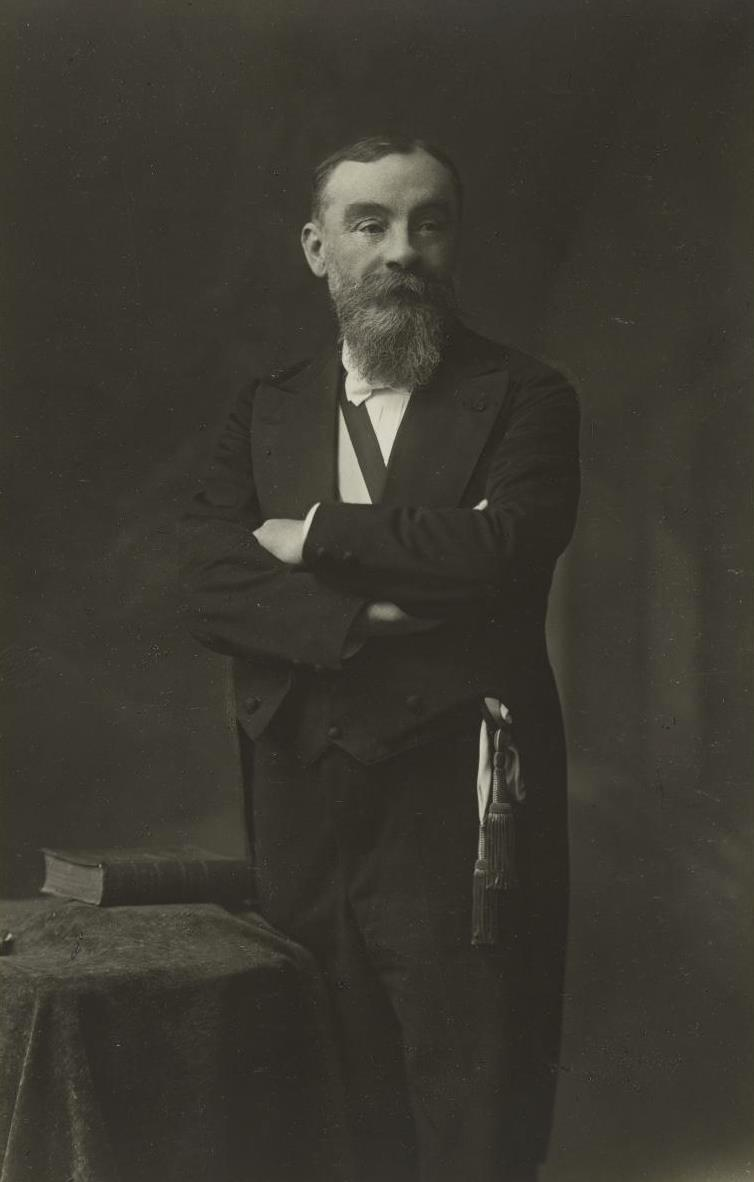
Ferdinand Brunot

- Ferdinand Brunot (1860–1938) – linguist and philologist
- Alexandre Matheron (1926–2020) – philosopher
- Mohammed Arkoun (1928–2010) – Algerian intellectual historian of the Islam and philosopher.
- Daniel Babut (1929–2008) – Greek scholar
- Robert Faurisson (1929–2018) – French academic and arts teacher today redeemed, above all known as activist and Holocaust denial author.
- Manfred Kelkel (1929–1999) – musicologist
- Colette Grinevald (born 1947) – linguist
- Gérard Le Vot (born 1948) – musicologist
- Dominique Gonnet (born 1950) – religious scholar
- Marie Anaut (born 1956) – clinical psychologist
- Bernard Lahire (born 1963) – French sociologist, honorary member of the Order of Arts and Letters.
- Tarek Abdallah (born 1975) – musicologist
- Anne Penesco – musicologist
- Harriet Jisa – developmental linguist

=== Society and Environment ===
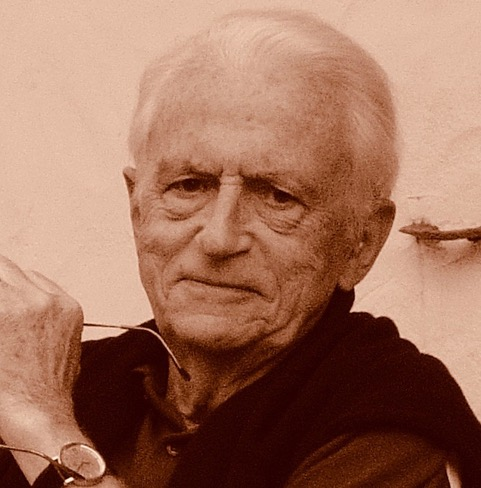
Xavier de Montclos

- Xavier de Montclos (1924–2018) – historian of religion
- Thierry Bianquis (1935–2014) – professor of Islamic history and civilisation
- Jean-Claude Goyon (1937–2021) – Egyptologist
- André Pelletier (born 1937) – historian
- Pierre Guichard (1939–2021) – historian, archeologist, medievalist
- Étienne Fouilloux (born 1941) – historian of religion
- Joseph Yacoub (born 1944) – historian and political scientist
- Roland Étienne (born 1944) – archaeologist
- Philippe Meirieu (born 1949) – politician
- Jacques Berlioz (born 1953) – historian
- Isabelle von Bueltzingsloewen (born 1964) – public health historian
- Anne Hugon (1965) – historian
- Manlio Graziano – political scientist
- Paul Mattei – Roman scholar

=== Economics and Management ===
- Jacques Bichot – French economist, university professor, honorary member of the Economic and Social Council.
- Yves Crozet – French economist, university professor emeritus.
- Dominique Meyer (born 1955) – economist and politician

=== Law ===
- Serge Guinchard (born 1950) – legal scholar

== Notable alumni ==
=== Academia ===
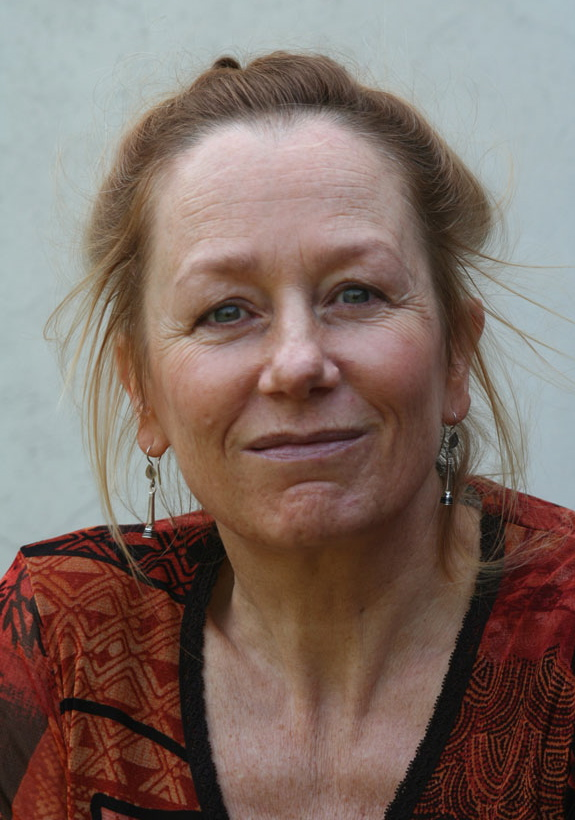
Sylvie Granger

- Charles Bonnet (born 1933) – archeologist
- Hammadi Sammoud (born 1946) – Tunisian academic
- Sylvie Granger (1955–2022) – modernist historian
- Marc Gabolde (born 1957) – Egyptologist
- Christian Lorenzi (born 1968) – experimental psychologist
- Lina Gálvez (born 1969) – Spanish economic historian
- Hervé Lacombe – musicologist
- N'Dri Thérèse Assié-Lumumba – Africanist scholar; President of the World Council of Comparative Education Societies

=== Activism ===
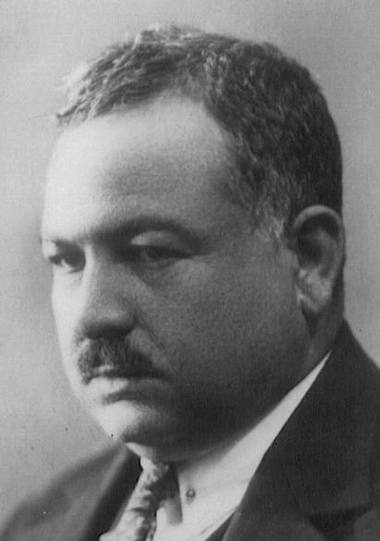
Muhammad Loutfi Goumah

- Muhammad Loutfi Goumah (1886–1953), Egyptian public figure, essayist, barrister
- Denise Domenach-Lallich (1924–2020) – French resistance activist
- Sima Abd Rabo (born 1976) – Syrian civil society activist
- Bruno Julliard (born 1981) – former President of the UNEF, the largest student union in France.

=== Business ===
- Jérôme Kerviel (born 1977) – Société Générale trader who incurred one of the largest losses in banking history.

=== Diplomacy ===
- Jacqueline Marie Zaba Nikiema (born 1957) – Burkina Faso diplomat
- Mahamoud Ali Youssouf (born 1965) – politician and diplomat

=== Law and judiciary ===
- Kim Sathavy (born 1954) – Cambodian judge
- Koeut Rith (born 1979) – Cambodian legal expert
- Laurence Boisson de Chazournes – lawyer and professor
- Marie-Anne Cohendet – law and political science

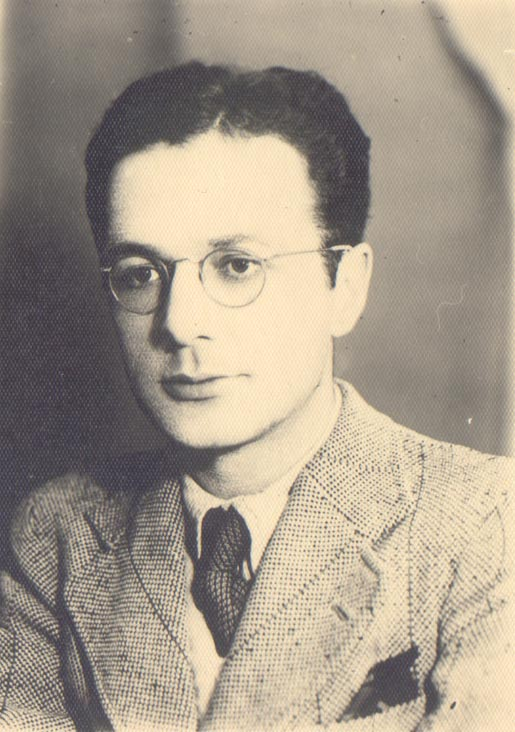
Dhimitër Shuteriqi

=== Literature and journalism ===
- Dhimitër Shuteriqi (1915–2003) – Albanian literary historian, poet, author
- Ezza Agha Malak (born 1942) – novelist and poet
- Khal Torabully (born 1956) – Mauritian poet
- Michèle Léridon (1958–2021) – journalist
- Thierry Frémaux (born 1960) – film critic
- Stéphane Pedrazzi (born 1978) – television journalist

=== Performing arts ===
- Kyrie Kristmanson (born 1989) – Canadian singer-songwriter

=== Politics ===
- Henri Philippe Pharaoun (1901–1993), Lebanese politician and art collector
- Bedrettin Tuncel (1910–1980) – Turkish politician and academic
- Michel Noir (born 1944) – politician
- Azouz Begag (born 1957) – politician and economist
- Hélène Conway-Mouret (born 1960) – politician and academic
- Jérôme Nury (born 1972) – politician
- Cendra Motin (born 1975) – politician
- Thomas Gassilloud – politician

== See also ==
- University of Lyon
- List of public universities in France by academy
