= Pedrazzi =

Pedrazzi is an Italian surname. Notable people with the surname include:

- Rubens Pedrazzi (1907–1980), Italian sculptor
- Stéphane Pedrazzi (born 1978), French telejournalist
- Waldemar Pedrazzi (born 1955), Uruguayan cyclist
