= Charles Wagner =

French Calvinist pastor (1852–1918)

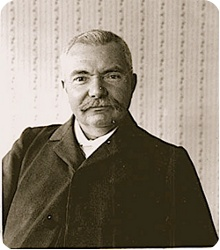
- Charles Wagner, founder of the Foyer de l'Âme
- Born: 4 January 1852; Vibersviller, French Second Republic
- Died: 12 May 1918 (aged 66)

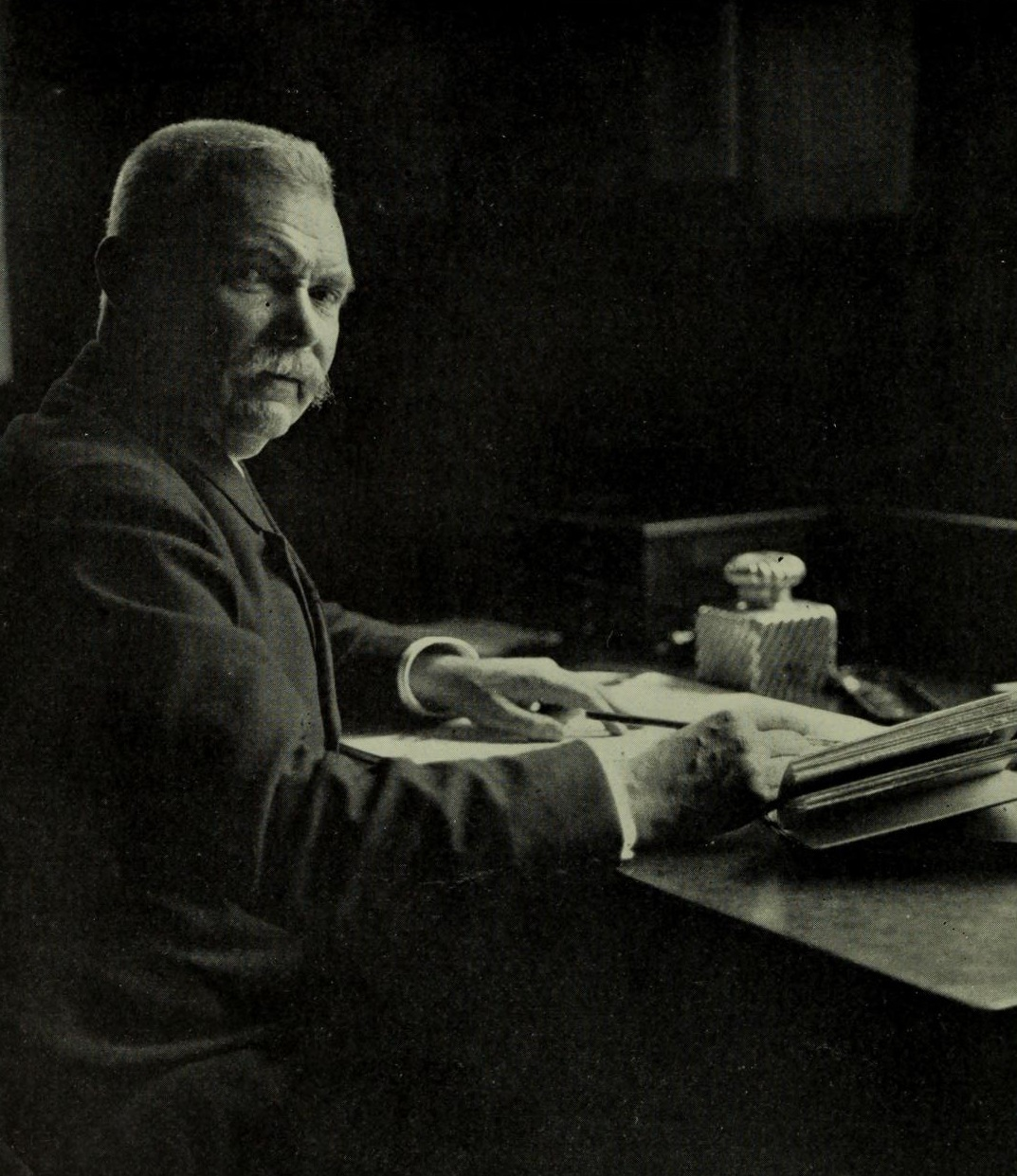
Charles Wagner at work

Charles Wagner (4 January 1852 – 12 May 1918) was a French Reformed pastor whose inspirational writings were influential in shaping the Reformed theology of his time.

== Biography ==
Wagner was born in Vibersviller, Moselle, where his father was the pastor of the Lutheran Church. At the age of 14, he was sent to study in Paris and graduated from the Sorbonne in 1869 with a B.A. degree. He then went to Strassburg for a theological degree but continued his studies in Göttingen.

Up to this time his associations had been with the Lutheran Church but in 1878, he left Germany and began ministerial service in connection with the liberal wing of the French Protestant Church. He was the pastor of a small parish in Remiremont, Vosges until 1882, when he went to Paris.

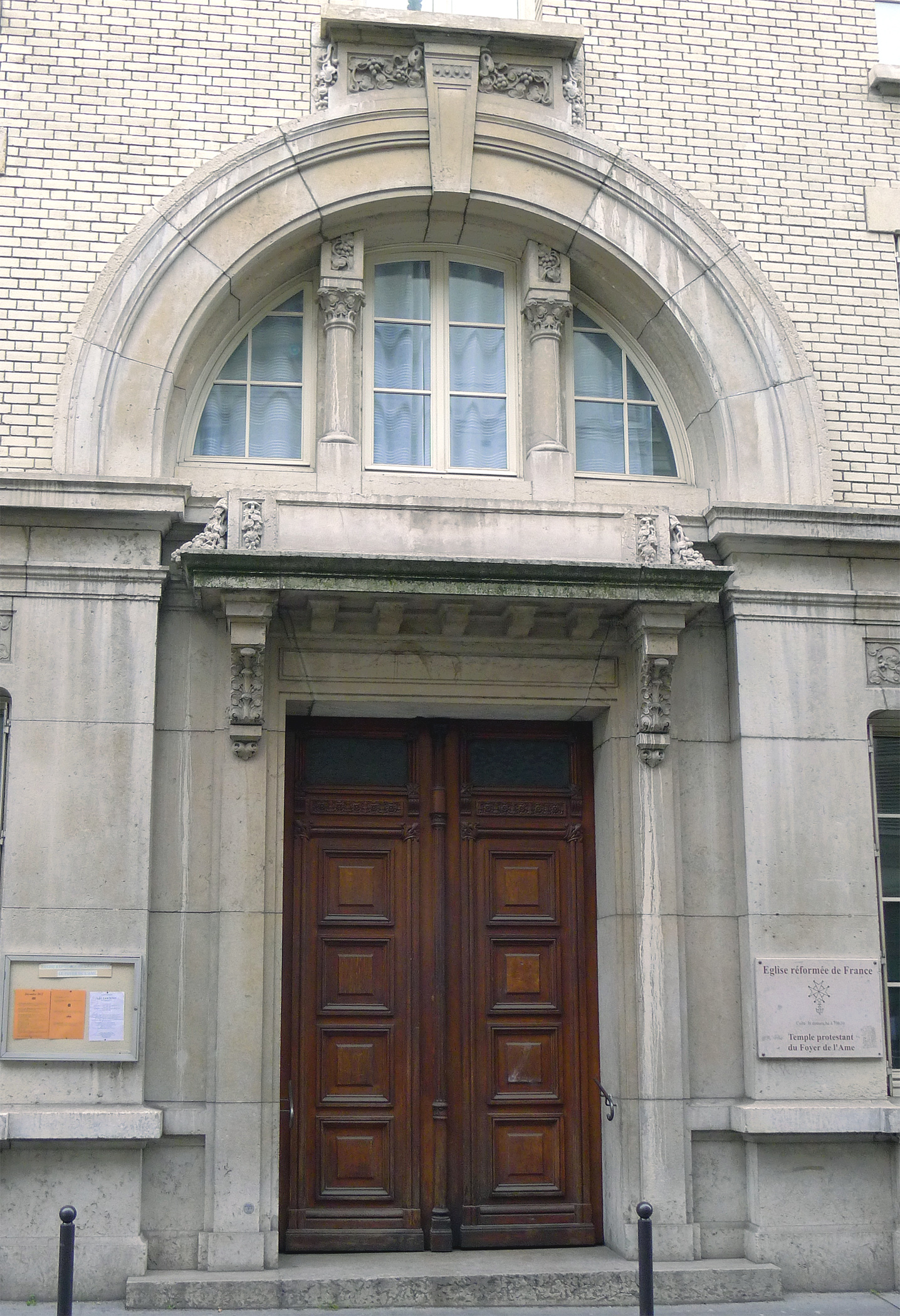
Temple protestant du Foyer de l'Âme

With his young wife, he began Paris life in a very modest way, living in a three-room apartment in a poor street near the Place de la Bastille, working hard at the university throughout the week, and occasionally preaching on Sundays as a guest preacher. He soon found all orthodox pulpits closed to him, however. In response, under the auspices of the French Protestant Church, he opened a Sunday school in his Bastille neighborhood. This was the germ of his first church and later of his new church Temple protestant du Foyer de l'Âme ('Protestant Temple of the Portal of the Soul'). The church cost the equivalent of ca. $60,000 of which a little less than one quarter was contributed by Americans.

His philosophy was one of Christian love without dogma, espousing a simple life and love of nature.

The publication of his book Jeunesse ('Youth') in 1891 marked him as a leader in the ethical movement in France and his influence continually increased. Besides serving as pastor to a large congregation, he took an active part in many philanthropic and charitable undertakings, and in this work came into cordial relations with men of all shades of religious belief. Of his publications, The Simple Life attracted particular interest in the United States and was widely commended by religious and ethical leaders.

In 1895, Wagner and Paul Desjardins founded L'Union pour l'action morale ('Union for moral action'), an organization in which he sought to bring together in practical work devoted men among Agnostics, Roman Catholics, Protestants and Jews.

He was on the committee of the first Université populaire, known as Coopération des Idées, founded by Georges Deherme the purpose of which was to provide evening classes to educate the working man.

In the fall of 1904, Wagner visited the United States. He was invited to preach at the White House by Theodore Roosevelt on whom The Simple Life had made a lasting impression. Wagner made numerous addresses and gained material for his book My Impressions of America (1906).

== Bibliography ==
=== English ===
- The Better Way (1903)
- Youth (1893)
- The Busy Life (1904)
- By the Fireside (1904)
- The Simple Life (1904)
- The Voice Of Nature, or The Soul Of Things (1904)
- Courage (1905)
- The Gospel Of Life (1905)
- Justice (1905)
- My Appeal To America (1905)
- On Life's Threshold (1905)
- My Impressions Of America (1906)
- Wayside Talks (1906)
- The Home of the Soul (1909)

Many of his books have been translated into English.

=== French ===
Most of his works are now out of print but Éditions Ampelos began to publish the principal works in 2006.

- Justice, huit discours (1889)
- Sois un homme (causeries sur la conduite de la vie) (1889) OCLC 458814043
- Vaillance (1893)
- Jeunesse (1895)
- La Vie simple (1895)
- L’Évangile et la Vie (1896)
- Le Long du chemin (1896) OCLC 9139153
- Auprès du foyer (1898)
- L'Âme des choses (1901)
- L'Ami, dialogues intérieurs (1902)
- Libre pensée et protestantisme libéral (with Ferdinand Buisson) (1903)
- Histoires et farciboles, pour les enfants (1904) OCLC 458813951
- Discours séparés (sermons) (1905)
  - "L'idée laïque"
  - "Suis-moi!"
  - "Ceux qu'on oublie"
  - "Les sarcleurs"
  - "Pentecôte"
  - "Le juste vivra de sa foi"
  - "Les Deux Esprits"
  - "La Marche à la vie"
  - "Le sel qui perd sa saveur"
  - "La marche à la vie"
  - "Inauguration de Foyer de l'âme"
- Cinq discours religieux (1905) OCLC 718216102
- Vers le cœur de l’Amérique (1906)
- Pour les petits et les grands (1907)
- Par la loi vers la liberté (1908)
- À travers les choses et les hommes pour apprendre à vivre (1909) OCLC 17246297
- En écoutant le maître (1910) OCLC 494650620
- Par le sourire (1910)
- Ce qu'il faudra toujours (1911)
- À travers le prisme du temps (1912) OCLC 458813887
- N'oublie pas! (1913) OCLC 68823471
- Le Bon Samaritain (1914)
- Missive d'un aîné (1916) OCLC 458814011
- Vive la France, par Charles Wagner (1916) OCLC 458814088
- Glaive à deux tranchants (1917)
- Devant le témoin invisible (1933) (compilation)

There is also Manuel de bonne vie (1905) by Mme Brandon-Salvador which is compiled from his works. The biography Un Homme by his nephew Alfred Wautier d'Aygalliers often refers to his own diary which is now lost which contained information on Wagner's life and thought. A recent biography, Charles Wagner et le Foyer de l’Âme by Pierre-Jean Ruff, tells the story of Charles Wagner and the Foyer de l’Âme. L’Homme est une espérance de Dieu is an anthology of Wagner's writings selected by Anne Penesco and Geoffroy de Turckheim has been published by Van Dieren Éditeur.
