= Mélanie Gourarier =

French anthropologist

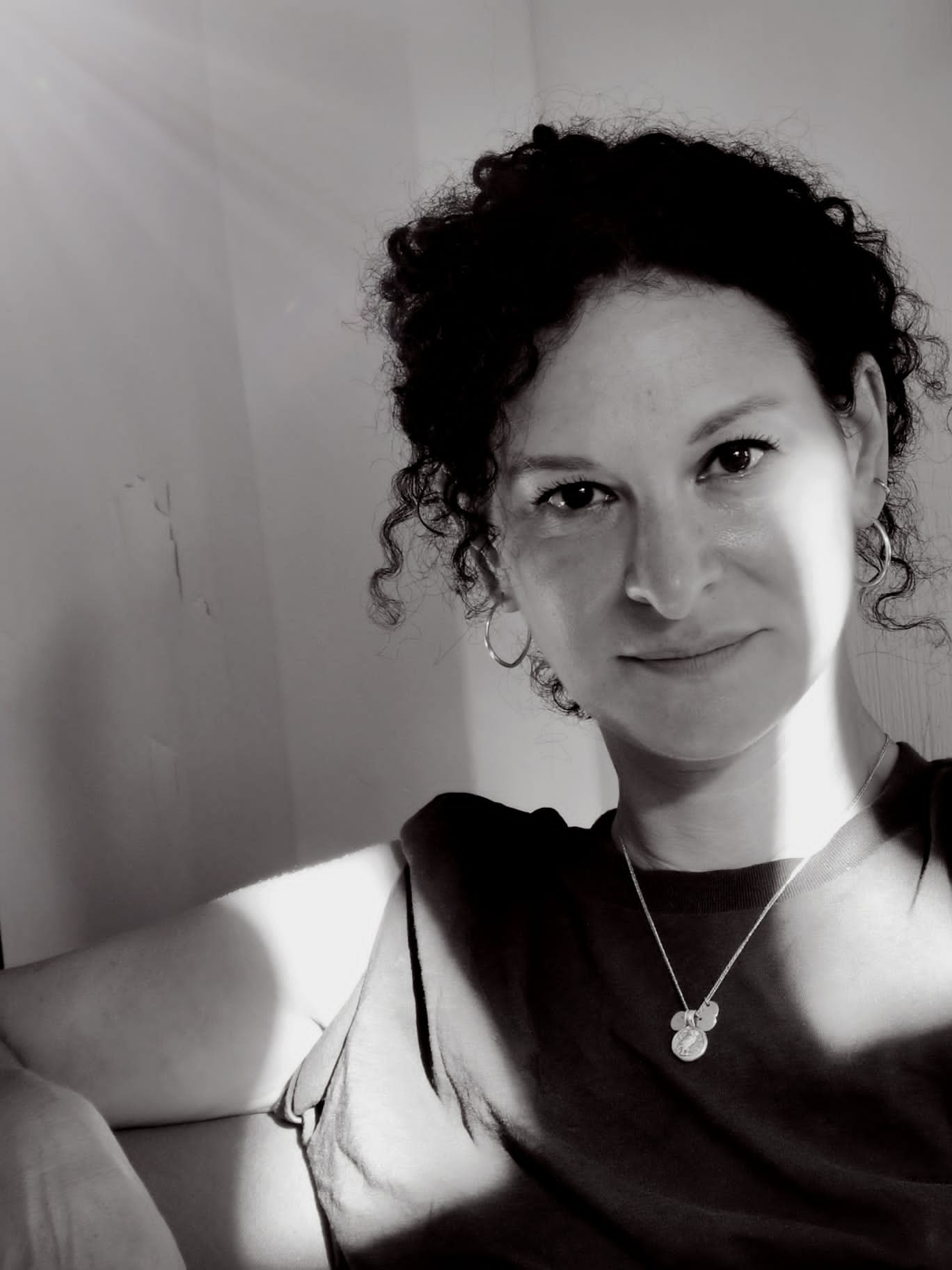
Gourarier in 2023

Mélanie Gourarier is a French anthropologist specializing in issues of gender and sexuality. Since 2017, she has been a research fellow at the French National Centre for Scientific Research (CNRS).

== Biography ==
Mélanie Gourarier defended her doctoral thesis in social anthropology at the School for Advanced Studies in the Social Sciences in 2012, entitled Séduire les femmes pour s'apprécier entre hommes, Une ethnographie des sociabilités masculines au sein de la Communauté de la séduction en France.

Mélanie Gourarier is a lecturer in the Genre, politique et sexualité master's program at her alma mater and a teaching and research fellow hired on a limited-time basis at the Le Mans University. Since 2017, she has been a research fellow at the CNRS.

Her research focuses mainly on gender, the anthropology of kinship and paternity, power relations, the hegemony and uses of genetics and bioethics. As part of the ETHOPOL program, funded by the National Research Agency from 2015 to 2019 and hosted at the University of Toulouse-Jean Jaurès, she is conducting research on the framing and communication of DNA paternity tests in order to study doubt in ways of determining parentage.

She is a member of the French Association of Anthropologists.

== Selected works ==
In 2010, Mélanie Gourarier published a book devoted to artist Niki de Saint Phalle. She is mainly interested in the work known as the "Garden of Tarots" installed in Tuscany, Italy to which the artist devoted herself entirely for nearly 20 years, between 1979 and 1998. Within this space, dictated by complete freedom of action and without any commission, Niki de Saint Phalle designed 22 colossal and colorful sculptures, symbolizing the major arcana of the divinatory tarot. Gourarier's book Niki de Saint-Phalle. The Garden of Tarots is accompanied by unpublished photographs taken by the photographer Laurent Condominas.

Gourarier published the comic strip Séducteurs de rue in 2016. The comic strip co-produced with Léon Maret for the Sociorama collection, deciphers the different flirting techniques observed over the past ten years in the streets of large Western cities.

In 2017, she published Alpha Male, Seducing Women to Appreciate Each Other Between Men. For three years, the anthropologist analyzed the behavior of young men who integrate flirting as an animal and ultra-codified practice. Doing everything to regain a masculine hegemony, the Alpha Males or Community of Seduction, define themselves as a group of mostly white men from the middle or upper classes, whose sometimes violent behavior responds to a form of female oppression of which they insist that they are the victims. Instead, she proposes that the question of evaluating the quality of male seduction requires evaluation of the question of consent between the parties, the consideration of "seduction as a relationship of reciprocity."
