= Paul Mattei =

- Born: 15 May 1953 (age 72); Marseille, France
- Education: Lycée Thiers
- Alma mater: École normale supérieure de Saint-Cloud
- Occupation: Philologist • Academic • Latinist

Paul Mattei (born 15 May 1953) is a French Latinist, professor of Latin language and literature at the Lumière University Lyon 2, a specialist of the History of Christianity and its first period, and scientific advisor of the Institut des sources chrétiennes. His research focuses particularly on the Christian Latin authors of Antiquity (third-fifth centuries) and medieval extensions (Merovingian and Carolingian times).

== Works ==
- Le Christianisme antique (Ier-Ve siècles), éditions Ellipses, Paris, 2002, 2004 and 2011
- Le Christianisme antique. De Jésus à Constantin, series "U", Armand Colin publisher, 2008 and 2011
- In collaboration with Serge Lancel, Pax et Concordia. Chrétiens des premiers siècles en Algérie (Ier-VIIe siècles), Alger, 2003; preface by André Mandouze; postface by Jean-Noël Guinot, directeur de l’Institut des sources chrétiennes
- In collaboration with Bernard Colombat, professor of Latin language and literature at the Stendhal University, direction du volume Curiosité historique et intérêts philologiques : Mélanges offerts à Serge Lancel, Recherches et travaux 54, University Stendhal (Grenoble-III), 1998

== Translations and research books ==
- 1988: Tertullian, Le Mariage unique (De monogamia). Introduction, critical text, translation and commentary, coll. Sources Chrétiennes n° 343, Éditions du Cerf
- 1997: Tertullian, Le Voile des vierges (De uirginibus uelandis). Introduction and commentary by E. Schuiz-Flügel, chercheur au Vetus Latina Institut (Beuron, RFA), adapted by P. Mattei, critical text by E. Schuiz-Flügel, translation by P. Mattei, series "Sources chrétiennes" n°424, Cerf
- Cyprian, L’Unité de l’Église (De ecclesiae catholicae unitate). Critical text by CCL 3 (M. Bévenot). Introduction by P. Siniscalco, emeritus professor at the Sapienza University of Rome, and P. Mattei. Translation by M. Poirier, honorary professor at the lycée Henri-IV, Paris. Apparats, notes, appendix and index by P. Mattei
