= Jacqueline Marie Zaba Nikiema =

Diplomat for the Republic of Burkina Faso

Jacqueline Marie Zaba Nikiéma (born 19 September 1957 in Ouagadougou, Burkina Faso), a career diplomat, is the Ambassador from Burkina Faso to the Organisation of African, Caribbean and Pacific States (ACP). She was also the Special Representative of the President of the ECOWAS Commission in Guinea.

As Ambassador Extraordinary and Plenipotentiary of Burkina Faso to the Kingdom of Belgium and Permanent Representative to the European Union, she signed the International Energy Charter on 16 March 2017.

She earned a Master's degree in Economic and Social Administration specializing in Public Service Management. She also earned a Bachelor's degree in the same field from University of Lyon II, as well as the University of Paris I, Sorbonne, France. She also has a Specialised Post-Graduate Degree (DESS) in Political Science with a bias for Development and Cooperation.
