= Jean-Baptiste Duroselle =

French historian

Jean-Baptiste Duroselle (17 November 1917, Paris – 12 September 1994, Arradon) was a French historian and professor. He had initially considered an army career or study of geography, but his poor skills in mathematics and drawing led him to turn to historical study. Pierre Renouvin's course fascinated him, and he became his assistant in 1945. He went on to teach at University of Saarbrücken from 1950 to 1957 and returned to the Sorbonne afterward. Between 1977 and 1979, he was visiting professor of the history of international relations at the Graduate Institute of International Studies in Geneva. Duroselle's writings include La Decadence (1980), L'Abime (1985), and others. Duroselle was elected to the American Philosophical Society in 1975. He was noted for his study of international relations and won a 1982 Balzan Prize for Social Sciences for his work.

Among his students was Élisabeth Du Réau, biographer of Édouard Daladier. He supervised her 1987, eight-volume thesis on Daladier, published in condensed form in 1993 as Édouard Daladier, 1884-1970.

== Biography ==
His father, Albert Duroselle, born in 1890 in Amiens, was called to arms during World War I. He was seriously wounded in the elbow in 1916 and awarded the Croix de Guerre.

== Selected bibliography ==
- Duroselle, Jean-Baptiste. L'Europe de 1815 à nos jours: vie politique et relations internationales (Presses universitaires de France, 1964)
- Itinéraires, idées, hommes et nations d'Occident, XIXe- xxe siècle (Paris, Publications de la Sorbonne, 1991), 491 p.
- L'invasion : les migrations humaines: chance ou fatalité? (Paris, Plon, 1992)
- La France de la Belle Époque (Paris, Presses de la Fondation Nationale des Sciences Politiques, 1992), 377 p.
- La Grande Guerre des Français, 1914-1918: l'incompréhensible (Paris, Perrin, 1994)
- Histoire diplomatique de 1919 à nos jours (1985).
- La décadence, 1932-1939 (Impr. nationale, 1979)

=== In English translation ===
- Duroselle, Jean-Baptiste. France and the Nazi Threat: The Collapse of French Diplomacy 1932–1939 (Enigma Books, 2004); translation of his highly influential La décadence, 1932-1939 (1979)
- Europe: A History of Its Peoples Viking, 1990.
- France and the United States from the Beginnings to the Present Day (University of Chicago Press, 1978)
- "The Spirit of Locarno: Illusions of Pactomania." Foreign Affairs 50.4 (1972). pp. 752–764 in JSTOR
- From Wilson to Roosevelt: Foreign policy of the United States, 1913-1945 (1968)
- Renouvin, Pierre, and Jean Baptiste Duroselle. Introduction to the history of international relations (New York, Praeger, 1967)
- "Changes in French Foreign policy since 1945." in Stanley Hoffmann, ed., In Search of France (Harvard University Press, 1963) pp: 331–400.
