= Ezza Agha Malak =

Lebanese-born French novelist, poet, critic and essayist

- آغا ملك، عزة
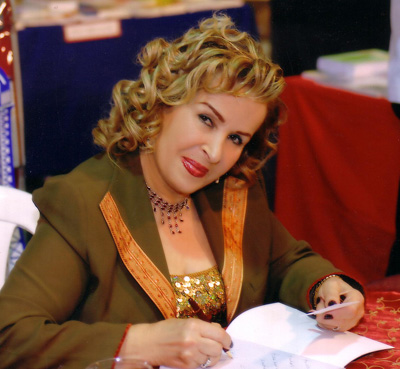
- Ezza Agha Malak, 1999
- Born: July 14, 1942 (age 84); Tripoli, Lebanon
- Education: École de Lettres; Lumière University Lyon 2
- Writing career
- Language: French
- Notable awards: Ordre des Arts et des Lettres (2012)

Ezza Agha Malak (born 14 July 1942) is a Lebanese-born French novelist, poet, critic and essayist.

== Biography ==
Born in 1942 in Tripoli, Agha Malak attended the École de Lettres in Beirut. She left Lebanon for France with her two daughters in 1975 at the beginning of the Lebanese Civil War. She studied French language and literature at Lumière University Lyon 2 where she received doctorates in literature and linguistics.

Agha Malak has written novels, short stories and several collections of poetry. Her works stand out against the injustice and violence of war and criticize the role of women in the Muslim world while examining the sociological aspects of the male-female partnership. She is present at several book fairs each year, especially the annual French-language book fair in Beirut. She is still an active writer, spending her time between the north of Lebanon and Burgundy where she lives.

== Awards ==
In 2012, Ezza Agha Malak was honoured as an officier of the French Ordre des Arts et des Lettres.

== Works ==
Novels and short stories

- 2010: Qu'as-tu fait de tes mômes, Papa ? Paris, AlfAbarre
- 2009: Mariée à Paris... Répudiée à Beyrouth, Paris, L'Harmattan
- 2006: Bagdad : des morts qui sonnent plus fort que d'autres, Paris, Éditions des Écrivains
- 2005: Anosmia ou Nostalgie d’un sens interdit, Paris, Éditions des Écrivains, translated into English by Cynthia Hahn
- 2002: Récits Roses (two short stories), Paris, Éditions des Écrivains
- 2001: La Femme de mon mari, Paris, Éditions des Écrivains
- 1999: Les Portes de la Nuit, Paris, Éditions des Écrivains
- 1997: La Dernière des Croisés, Beirut, Maison Internationale du Livre
- 1996: La Mallette, Beirut, Éditions Jarrous
- 1994: Balafres
- 1992: Récits bleus (three short stories), Paris, Éditions Al-Moutanabbi
- 1960: Sans rendez-vous préalable (short story), Beirut, Presses de Beyrouth
- 1957: Le drame n’arrivera pas deux fois (short story), Beirut, Presses de Beyrouth

Poetry

- 2011: Mes Villes Mes Amours Mes Solitudes, Éditions Dergham Beyrouth
- 2008: À quatre mains et à deux cœurs, Paris, Éditions des Écrivains
- 2005: Petits poèmes pour un Grand Homme, Beirut, Éditions du Roy
- 2004: Poésie tripolitaine francophone, Tripoli, Éditions du Roy
- 2003: La mise à nu, Paris, Éditions des Écrivains
- 2000: Modes inconditionnels des aubes mensongères Paris, Éditions des Écrivains
- 1992: Quand les larmes seront pleurées ... , Beeirut, Technopress
- 1992: Entre deux battements de temps, Beirut, Technopress
- 1985: Migration, Beirut, Éditions Jarrous
