= Joseph Yacoub =

French historian and political scientist of Assyrian origin (born 1944)

Emeritus Professor Joseph Yacoub
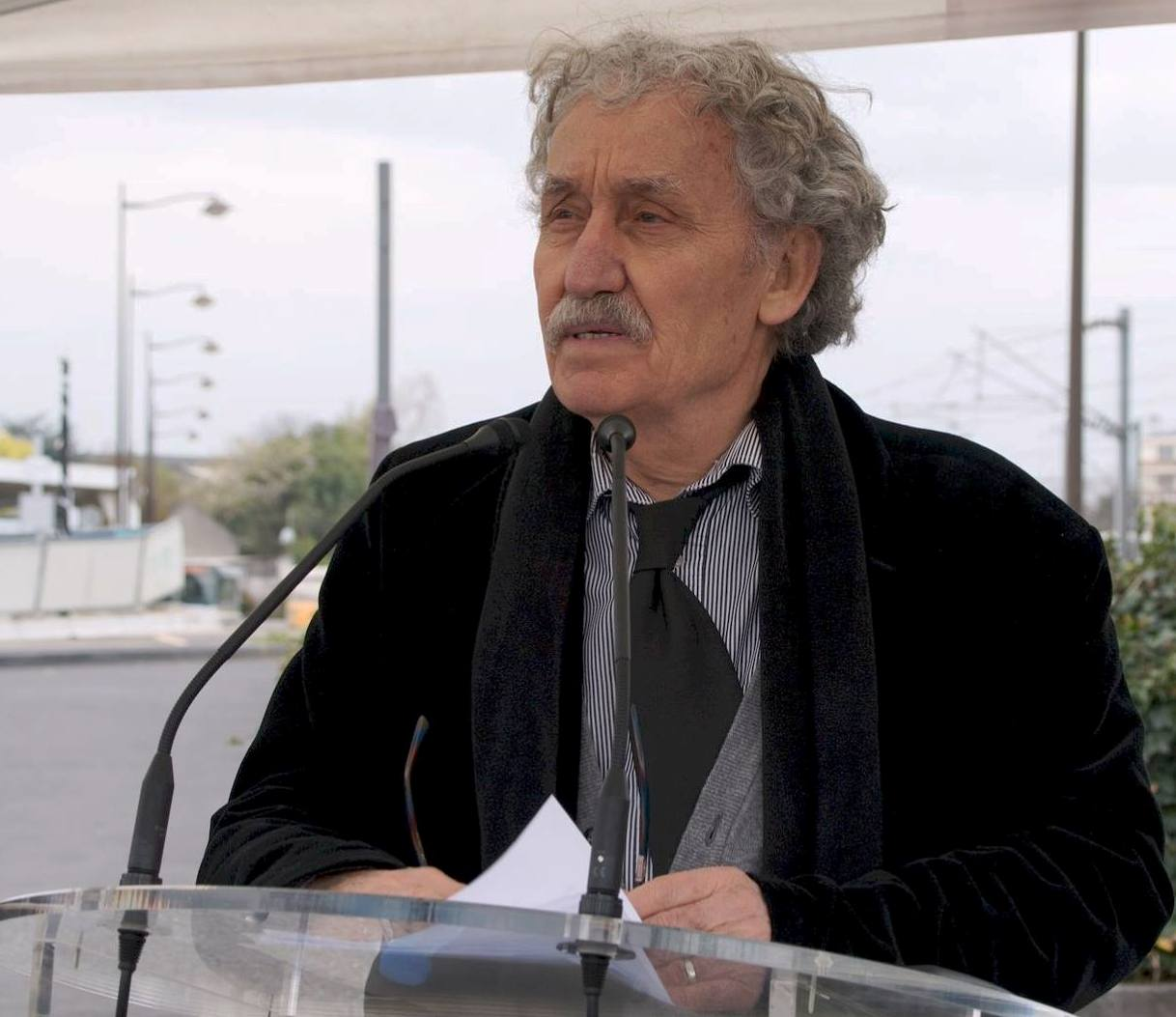
- Born: July 2, 1944; Al-Hasakah, Syria
- Education: Catholic University of Lyon
- Scientific career
- Thesis: The Assyro-Chaldean Question — The Western Powers and the League of Nations, from 1908-1938 (1985)

Joseph Yacoub (born 1944 in Hassaké or Al-Hasakah, Syria) is a historian and political scientist of Assyrian origin. His family moved from Salmas-Urmia, district in Iranian Azerbaijan and took refuge in Georgia (country of Caucasus area) during the First World War. From Tiflis/Tbilissi his family migrated to Syria which was during this time under French Mandate. His mother tongue is Aramaic (or Syriac) and his first environment language is Arabic. His working language is mostly French.

== Biography ==
Following French secondary schools in Lebanon and after completing his course of learning at Lyon's University (France), where he achieved two Doctorates in the field of contemporary history (the second on Assyro-Chaldean Question between the two World wars: 1908-1938), he has been teaching Political Science and International Relations at Catholic University of Lyon, from July 1975 to October 2011, mainly at the Institute of Human Rights, who is one of the founders.

He was Holder of the UNESCO Chair: ”Memory, Cultures and Interculturality” of the mentioned University and Editor-in-chief of its Academic review: “Etudes interculturelles” (Intercultural Studies) from 2007 to 2011. He continues to be member of its orientation committee and its editorial review.

He was granted rewards, amongst them the Cross of the Assyrian Church of the East by the late Mar Denkha IV. Since April 2006, his name is mentioned on the Wall Fresco of Lyon’s people as writer.

Specialist on ethnic, religious, cultural and linguistic minorities, Indigenous peoples, Human Rights and Christians of Middle East, he is translated into several languages.

Actively involved in the commemoration of the centennial of the Assyrian genocide in France, Europe and abroad (Lebanon, Armenia, Germany, Belgium, Switzerland, Italy, United-States, Canada ... ), Joseph Yacoub has published his first articles on Assyrian genocide on the beginning of 1984.

He took part to numerous colloquia and international conferences over the world in order to make known Assyrians, to promote understanding among peoples, Intercultural and Interreligious dialogue on international scale. His books are regularly reviewed and submitted to analysis. Historian David Gaunt states that Yacoub's book Year of the Sword is a valuable source of primary accounts but that Yacoub's limited source base and lack of source criticism preclude him from understanding why the Sayfo happened.

== Bibliography ==
=== Books ===
- The Assyrian Question, Alpha Graphic, Chicago, 1986, republished with additional elements in 2003, translated into Arabic and Turkish.
- Les minorités. Quelle protection? Editions Desclée de Brouwer (DDB), Paris, 1995.
- Babylone chrétienne. Géopolitique de l'Eglise de Mésopotamie,Editions Desclée de Brouwer (DDB), Paris, 1996.
- Réécrire la Déclaration universelle des droits de l’homme, Editions Desclée de Brouwer (DDB), Paris, 1998; published and updated in 2008.
- Les minorités dans le monde. Faits et analyses, Editions Desclée de Brouwer (DDB), Paris, 1998.
- Au-delà des minorités. Une alternative à la prolifération des Etats, Ed. de l'Atelier, Paris, 2000, translated into Arabic.
- Au nom de Dieu ! Les guerres de religion d’aujourd’hui et de demain, Editions Jean Claude Lattès, février 2002, Paris, translated into Czech.
- Menaces sur les chrétiens d’Irak, Editions CLD, Chambray-lès-Tours, mars 2003; translated into Italian : I Cristiani d’Iraq, Ed. Jaca Book, Milano, 2006.
- A l'épreuve des civilisations et des cultures, repenser les droits de l'homme. Une approche critique, in: L'Odyssée des droits de l'homme, t.III, "Enjeux et perspectives des droits de l'homme", J. Ferrand et H. Petit (Eds.), L'Harmattan, Paris, 2003, p. 183-200.
- Les droits de l’homme sont-ils exportables ? Géopolitique d’un universalisme, Editions Ellipses, Paris, 2004.
- Minorities and religions in Europe. Case-study: The Assyro-Chaldeans of Turkey, 2006, in European Yearbook of Minority issues, European Center of Minority issues (ECMI), Flensburg, Allemagne, vol. 4, 2004/5, Martinus Nijhoff Publishers, p. 29-49.
- Le minoranze cristiane in Siria, Siria dalle Antiche citta-stato alla primavera interrotta di Damasco, A cura di Mattia Guidetti, Ed. Jaca Book, 2006, Milano, p. 155-164.
- La démocratie occidentale est-elle transposable ? Démocratie et fondamentalisme religieux dans les pays arabes, Annuaire international des droits de l’homme, vol. II, 2007, Editions Bruylant and Sakkoulas, p. 297-326.
- Fièvre démocratique et ferveur fondamentaliste. Dominantes du XXIè siècle, Editions du Cerf, Paris, 2008.
- La dignité dans la pensée mésopotamienne et ses implications en Irak aujourd’hui, in La dignité humaine. Perspectives transculturelles, Jacques Poulain, Hans Jörg Sandkühler, Fathi Triki, Philosophie et transculturalité, vol. 7, Peter Lang, 2009, Frankfurt am Main, p. 63-98.
- L’Humanisme réinventé, Editions du Cerf, Paris, 2012.
- Diversité culturelle et universalité des droits de l’homme, in : Les droits de l’homme. Défis et mutations, ouvrage collectif, edited by André S. Dizdarevic et Roger Koussetogue Koudé, L’Harmattan, 2013, Paris, p. 19-34.
- La reconnaissance internationale de la diversité culturelle et des minorités. Leur statut dans le monde arabe, in : Minorities in Iraq. Memory, identity and challenges, edited by Sa’ad Salloum, Masarat for cultural and Media development, Bagdad-Beyrouth, 2013, (in French, Arabic and English languages).
- Multiculturalism and Minority Rights in the Arab World, edited by Will Kymlicka and Eva Pföstl, communication entitled : « How does the Arab World perceive Multiculturalism and treat its minorities ? The Assyro-Chaldeans of Iraq as a case study », Oxford University Press (OUP), Oxford, 2014, p. 250-277.
- Qui s’en souviendra ? 1915 : le génocide assyro-chaldéen-syriaque, Editions du Cerf, Paris, octobre 2014.
- Oubliés de tous. Les Assyro-Chaldéens du Caucase. with his wife Claire Weibel Yacoub, Editions du Cerf, Paris, 2015, Academic Price of Oeuvre d'Orient, 2016.
- Year of the Sword. The Assyrian Christian Genocide. A History, (Qui s'en souviendra? 1915: le génocide assyro-chaldéen-syriaque) translated by James Ferguson from French into English, Hurst Publishers, London, August 2016.

=== Articles ===
- Joseph Yacoub published several hundreds articles in worldwide newspapers (Le Monde, Le Figaro, La Croix, (French daily newspapers)..., Avvenire (Italian daily newspaper), L’Orient-Le Jour (Lebanese daily newspaper), la Libre Belgique (Belgian daily newspaper), Le Devoir (Newspaper, Quebec, Canada), Al-Hayat, Al-Quds Al-Arabi ...
- He produced contributions in Academic reviews, among them : Diogenes (Diogène),Vita e Pensiero, Revue trimestrielle des droits de l'homme (RTDH), le Monde diplomatique, Confluence Méditerranée, Proche Orient Chrétien (POC), Les Annales de l'autre Islam ...

=== The Assyrian question: publications ===
- Les Réfugiés assyro-chaldéens de Turquie, CEDRI, Forcalquier, 1986.
- The Assyrian Question, Alpha Graphic, Chicago, 1986. Second edition 1993.
- Les Assyro-Chaldéens d’aujourd’hui, in: L’Afrique et l‘Asie modernes, CHEAM, Paris, 1986-1987, p. 28-44.
- Les Assyro-Chaldéens. Un peuple oublié de l’histoire, Groupement pour les droits des minorités (GDM), Paris, 1987.
- La question assyro-chaldéenne, les Puissances européennes et la Société des Nations, in: Guerres mondiales et conflits contemporains, Revue trimestrielle d'histoire, PUF, n° 151, Paris, 1988, p. 103-120.
- Diasporas et Développement, in: Histoires de développement (revue), Catholic University of Lyon, n° 6, juin 1989.
- Les Assyro-Chaldéens, une minorité en voie d'émergence?, Centre québécois de relations internationales, Canada, Québec, Université Laval, juin 1990, p. 341-373.
- Les Assyro-Chaldéens, translated into Japonese language in: Minorities in the World and the legal system, Buraku Liberation Research Institute, Osaka, 1991, p. 226-246.
- Les Assyro-Chaldéens, une minorité dispersée, in: Hommes et Migrations, numéro spécial consacré au sujet « Minorités au Proche-Orient », janvier-février 1994, Paris, p. 37-41.
- De Babylone à Paris : la diaspora assyro-chaldéenne, in L’Espace géographique, numéro consacré aux diasporas, Michel Bruneau coordinateur, Doin éditeurs - Paris, Reclus-Montpellier, tome XXIII, n° 1, 1994, p. 29-37.
- Les Assyro-Chaldéens originaires de Turquie : une communauté en situation migratoire, in Les Annales de l’autre Islam, INALCO-ERISM, 1995, n° 3, Paris, p. 451-466.
- Minorities and religions in Europe. Case-study: The Assyro-Chaldeans of Turkey, in: European Yearbook of Minority issues, European Center of Minority issues (ECMI), Flensburg, Allemagne, vol. 4, 2004/5, Martinus Nijhoff Publishers.
- Participation to the documentary film realized and produced by Robert Alaux, "The Last Assyrians", Paris, Lieurac production, 2005.
- Les Assyro-Chaldéens du Caucase. Une trajectoire migratoire méconnue, Holy Spirit University of Kaslik, Lebanon, 5 December 2014.
- Participation to the documentary film produced by Robert Alaux and Nahro Beth-Kinné, Seyfo l'élimination. Centenaire d'un génocide 1915-2015.
- La diaspora assyro-chaldéenne. Entre identité et intégration, in : La vocation des Chrétiens d’Orient. Défis actuels et enjeux d’avenir dans leurs rapports à l’Islam, Ed. Karthala, Paris, 2015, p. 189-206.
- Les chrétiens d’Orient en France. Capacité d’adaptation et attachement à leur identité. Etude de cas : Les Assyro-Chaldéens de France, in: L'unité des chrétiens. Pourquoi? Pour qui? sous la direction de Michel Mallèvre, Editions du Cerf, Paris, April 2016, p. 55-75.
