= Le Mans University =

Public university in western France

Coordinates: 48°00′54″N 0°09′41″E

- Le Mans Université
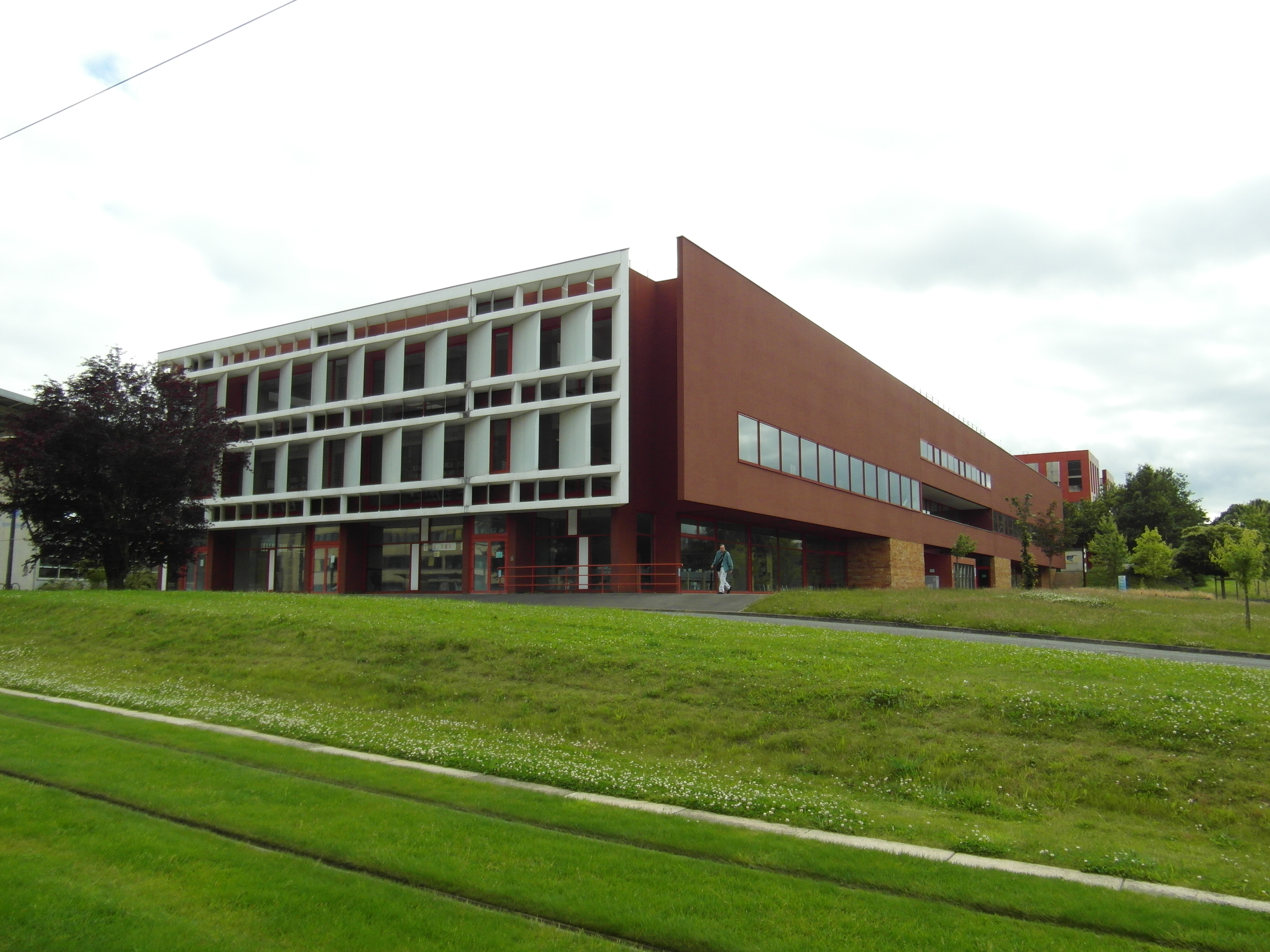
- Le Mans campus
- Type: Public
- Established: 1977: Université du Maine 2017 (renamed): Le Mans Université
- Affiliations: AUF, ComUE Angers-Le Mans, EUA
- Budget: €96 million
- President: Pascal Leroux
- Academic staff: 1,100
- Students: 13,000
- Location: Laval & Le Mans, Pays de la Loire, France
- Website: univ-lemans.fr

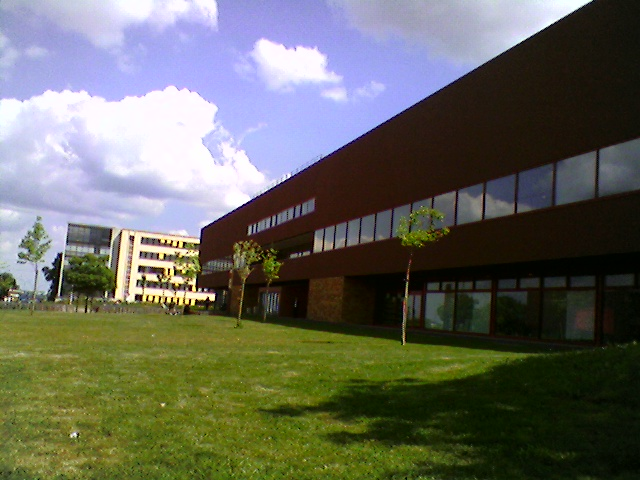
University library on the Le Mans campus

Le Mans University (French: Le Mans Université; formerly Université du Maine) is a public university in western France with campuses in Le Mans and Laval.

It is part of the Angers-Le Mans University Community.

== History ==
=== Beginnings ===
The university opened in 1977 as the University of Maine, named after the former Maine province of which it is a part. However, its history goes back a decade before that. In 1965, the decision was made to open a literary college on the edge of Le Mans. This college was only an annex of the University of Caen, where decisions were made jointly by the leaders of the university with the leaders of the Le Mans. The hill of Vaurouzé was chosen to host the new study center. The proximity of a few kilometers with the hospital suggests the possibility of opening a hospital one day. In 1966, the buildings of the CLOUS (Local Center for University and School Works) were built. Housing and a dining services were the only services available. A year later, the IUTs of business management, business administration and chemistry were opened. In 1968, the IUT was increased by two sections: mechanical engineering and production engineering. Cities continue to be created. In 1969, the city of Le Mans obtained total independence from the University of Caen. The university was no longer an annex, but a university centre in its own right.

In 1975, two new UFRs opened: Law and Letters.

In 2017, the university renamed itself to Le Mans University.

== Campus and student life ==
The university's campuses are both located on spacious plots of land on the outskirts of Laval and Le Mans.

The university has CROUS residence halls and dining services available to students on both campuses.

Le Mans University has several student organisations and sports clubs available to students.

== Notable people ==
=== Faculty ===
- Guy Pedroncini (1924-2006) - military historian
- Élisabeth Du Réau (1937-2021) - historian
- Gérard Férey (1941, in Bréhal – 2017) - chemist
- Nicole El Karoui (born 1944, in Paris) - mathematician, pioneer in the development of mathematical finance
- Antoine Compagnon (born 1950 in Brussels, Belgium) - specialist in French literature
- Mélanie Gourarier, social anthropologist specializing in issues of gender and sexuality
- Sylvie Granger (1955, Lyon – 2022) - modernist historian.
- Sylvie Faucheux (born 1960, in Paris) - specialist in the economy of the natural environment and sustainable development; university president
- Dominique Avon (born 1968, in Ghent) - historian of religion

=== Alumni ===
- Gilbert Paquette (born 1942, in Montreal) - computer scientist
- Bertrand Lançon (born 1952, Le Mans) - historian and novelist, a specialist of late Antiquity
- Jean-Carles Grelier (born 1966, Le Mans) - politician of The Republicans (LR)
- Marc Joulaud (born 1967, in Mayenne) - politician, MEP
- François Fillon (born 1954, Le Mans) - Prime Minister
- Sébastien Bourdais (born 1979, Le Mans) - race car driver
- Bertrand Louvel - Chief Justice of the Court of Cassation

== See also ==
- List of public universities in France by academy
