= Sylvie Granger =

French historian (1955–2022)

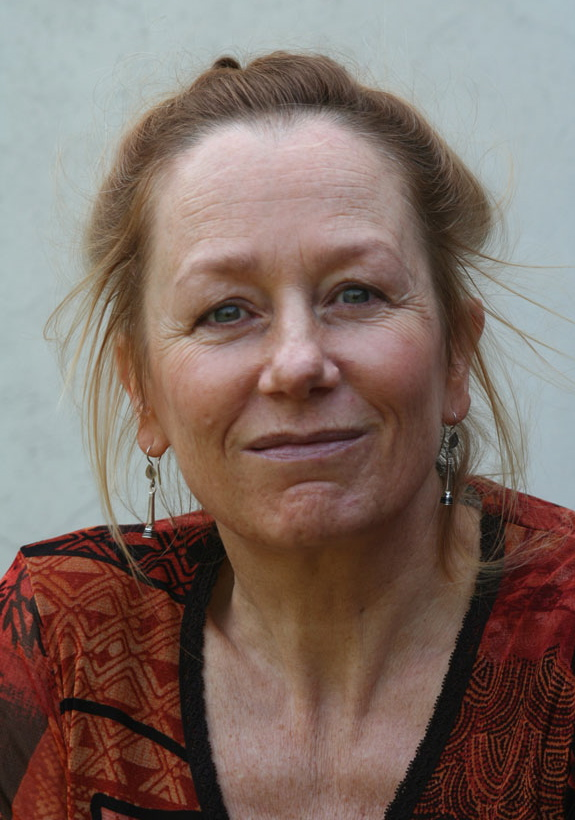
- Granger in 2007
- Born: 1955; Lyon, France
- Died: 12 June 2022 (aged 66–67); Le Mans, France
- Education: Lumière University Lyon 2 Aix-Marseille University; Le Mans University
- Occupation: Historian

Sylvie Granger (1955 – 12 June 2022) was a French modernist historian. She gained notoriety for her works on music and dance of the 18th century.

== Biography ==
Granger studied under historian Anne Fillon and defended her thesis on 15 February 1997. She became a research assistant at Le Mans University and taught a course titled "Dance and Society from the 16th to the 19th century". She continued her position as a research assistant until her retirement from teaching in 2016, although continued her activities in research. She was a member of the Temos laboratory.

Granger died on 12 June 2022.

== Works ==
- Musiciens dans la ville, 1600-1850 (2002)
- Journal d’un chanoine du Mans, Nepveu de La Manouillère, 1759-1807 (2013)
- Musiciennes en duo, Mères, filles, sœurs ou compagnes d’artistes (2015)
- Femmes en Sarthe, Actrices de leur temps (2015)
- Hommes en Sarthe, Acteurs de leur temps (2015)
- Souvenirs d'un villageois du Maine, Louis Simon (1741-1820) (2016)
- Jardins d’émotions en Sarthe (2017)
- Danser dans la France des Lumières (2019)
