= Laurence Boisson de Chazournes =

Swiss-french lawyer and professor

Laurence Boisson de Chazournes is a Swiss-French lawyer and professor at the University of Geneva and the Collège de France.

== Life and work ==
=== Education and professional career ===
Boisson de Chazournes obtained an undergraduate degree in political science in 1979 at the University of Lyon II. The following year she obtained a diploma in sociology and the master in law at the Jean Moulin University Lyon 3. Between 1983 and 1990, she worked as a research assistant at the University of Geneva. After completing her postgraduate studies in 1987, she received her doctorate of international law in 1991 from the Graduate Institute of International Studies and Development. That same year, she became obtained her habilitation from the Université Panthéon-Assas in Paris.

Between 1992 and 1995, she lectured at the University of Geneva and at the Graduate Institute of International Studies and Development. She then worked as a consultant at the World Bank, where she dealt with issues of international and environmental law. In 1999, she became a full professor in international law and the law of international organizations at the University of Geneva. In addition to her research in these areas, she has held visiting professorships at the Paul Cézanne Aix-Marseille III University and the Hague Academy for International Law. Boisson de Chazournes is the co-editor of numerous professional journals, including the American Journal of International Law, and is on the scientific advisory board of the European Journal of International Law. In 2022, she became the holder of the Chair Avenir Commun Durable at the Collège de France.

=== Memberships and honors ===
Boisson de Chazournes has been a member of the Permanent Court of Arbitration since 2007. She is a member of both the American Society of International Law and the International Law Association. In addition, she is a member of the executive council of the European Society of International Law.

Boisson de Chazournes has been was awarded the Manley O. Hudson Medal by the American Society of International Law, the Elizabeth Haub Prize for Environmental Law, and an honorary doctorate by the Aix-Marseille University.

== Publications (selection) ==
- Diplomatic and judicial means of dispute settlement. Nijhoff, Leiden 2013, ISBN 978-90-04-20997-8.
- Dispute Settlement Procedures and Fresh Water: Multiplicity and Diversity at Stake. In: Nerina Boschiero, Tullio Scovazzi, Cesare Pitea (Hrsg.): International Courts and the Development of International Law: Essays in Honour of Tullio Treves. T.M.C. Asser Press, Den Haag 2013, ISBN 9789067048941. S. 109–120.
- United in Joy and Sorrow: Some Considerations on Responsibility Issues under Partnerships among International Financial Institutions. In: Mauricio Ragazzi (Hrsg.): Responsibility of International Organizations – Essays in Memory of Sir Ian Brownlie. Oxford University Press, Oxford 2013. S. 211–224.
