= Colette Grinevald =

French linguist

- Born: 1947 (age 78–79)
- Other name: Colette Grinevald Craig

Academic background
- Education: Harvard University
- Thesis: Jacaltec Syntax: A Study of Complex Sentences (1975)

Academic work
- Discipline: Linguist
- Sub-discipline: Language documentation; Language preservation; Indigenous languages of the Americas
- Institutions: University of Oregon; Lumière University Lyon 2; CNRS

Colette Grinevald (born 1947) is a French linguist. She is professor emeritus at the University of Lyon.

== Career ==
Grinevald earned her PhD from Harvard University in 1975 and joined the newly created Linguistics department at the University of Oregon in 1977. Grinevald has written grammars of Jakaltek Popti' and Rama and advocates for endangered languages. She contributed to UNESCO's language vitality criteria developed in 2003. Grinevald serves on Sorosoro's scientific board.

== Life ==
Grinevald grew up in Algiers, in what was then French Algeria. She had recurrent tuberculosis as a young child. She married William Craig, then a medical student, while studying in Boston. The couple later divorced. Grinevald's children Matthias Craig and Guillaume Craig started a non-profit organization, Blue Energy.

== Publications ==
- Jacaltec : The Structure of Jacaltec by Colette Grinevald Craig 1977, Austin : University of Texas Press
