= Marie Anaut =

French clinical psychologist

- Born: 24 January 1956 (age 70)
- Education: University of Lyon 2
- Occupations: Clinical psychologist, professor

Marie Anaut (born 24 January 1956) is a professor of clinical psychology and educational sciences at the Lumière University Lyon 2. She is a specialist in psychological resilience.

== Life and work ==
In 1990, Marie Anaut defended her doctoral thesis entitled Child placement behaviors: analysis of intergenerational repetition at the University of Lyon 2 under the direction of Robert Martin. She was named a lecturer there and became director of the Institute of Psychology at that university from 1999 to 2004. She was a university vice-president from 2008 to 2012. After completing her post-doctoral habilitation in clinical psychology entitled De la vulnérabilité à la résilience (From vulnerability to resilience) in 2001, she was elected professor of clinical psychology and member of the Center for Research in Psychopathology and Clinical Psychology.

Anaut is a specialist in issues related to family ties, trauma and resilience. Her research focuses on individuals, families and groups confronted with adverse situations, particularly on forms of adaptation and integration of trauma. Her work and publications focus on theoretical and clinical aspects of resilience processes and parent-child relationships.

== Selected publications ==
- Anaut, M. (2005). Le concept de résilience et ses applications cliniques. Recherche en soins infirmiers, 82(3), 4–11.
- Anaut, M. (2006). L'école peut-elle être facteur de résilience?. Empan, 63(3), 30–39.
- Anaut, M. (2008). La résilience: surmonter les traumatismes. Armand Colin.
- Anaut, M. (2015). La résilience: évolution des conceptions théoriques et des applications cliniques. Recherche en soins infirmiers, (2), 28–39.
- Anaut, M. (2015). Psychologie de la résilience-3e édition. Armand Colin.
