= Daniel Babut =

French philosopher (1929–2009)

Daniel Babut (12 February 1929 – 13 February 2009) was a French Hellenist, specialising in Greek philosophy, especially the Moralia of Plutarch. He was employed by the Lumière University Lyon 2 from 1963 to 1992. He was born in Lille.

== Work ==
Daniel Babut dedicated his doctoral thesis, completed in 1969, to Plutarch and his reception of Stoicism. He showed that Plutarch was opposed, consistently and sometimes violently, to Stoic philosophy and made the Stoics his "chief adversaries." ». The same year he published the text of Plutarch's On Moral Virtue, one of the texts in which he found particularly marked polemic against the stoics, in the Collection Budé.

Interested in the question of Greek philosophers relationship with the divine, he published a synthesis La Religion des philosophes grecs de Thalès aux stoïcismes (The Religion of the Greek Philosophers from Thales to the Stoics) in 1974. His studies were particularly focussed on the place of Anaximander and Xenophanes in the evolution of ideas about the divine.

== Selected publications ==
- Plutarque et le stoïcisme (Plutarch & Stoicism), Paris, Presses universitaires de France, 1969 (thesis). Translated into Italian as Plutarco e lo stoicismo, Milan, Vita e Pensiero Università, 2003.
- La Religion des philosophes grecs de Thalès aux stoïcismes (The Religion of the Greek Philosophers from Thales to the Stoics), Paris, Presses universitaires de France, 1974.
- Sur l'unité de la pensée d'Empédocle (On the unity of Empedocles' Thought), Berlin, Akademie Verlag, 1976.
- Several volumes of Greek texts & commentaries for the collection Budé (Les Belles Lettres):
  - De la vertu éthique (On Moral Virtue) (1969).
  - Œuvres morales (Moralia), Volume XV, 1st part (in collaboration with Michel Casevitz for editing the text) : Tract 70 : Sur les contradictions stoïciennes (On Stoic Self-Contradictions); Tract 71 : Synopsis of tract Que les stoïciens tiennent des propos plus paradoxaux que les poètes (The Stoics Speak More Paradoxically than the Poets) (2004). ISBN 2-251-00522-6.
  - Œuvres morales (Moralia), Volume XV, 2nd part (in collaboration with Michel Casevitz for editing the text) : Tract 72 : Sur les notions communes, contre les Stoïciens (On Common Conceptions against the Stoics) (2002). ISBN 2-251-00507-2.
- Some of his articles have been published together as Parerga. Choix d'articles de Daniel Babut (1974–1994), Lyon, Maison de l'Orient méditerranéen, 1994.

== Bibliography ==
- "Nécrologie", Revue des Études grecques, t. 122, 2009, p. XXII.
