= Anne Penesco =

French musicologist, academic and biographer

Anne Penesco, née Anne Crépin is a French musicologist, academic and biographer.

== Career ==
Holder of a State doctorate in musicology, Anne Penesco was a lecturer at the Metz University, then lecturer at the Sorbonne Musicology Institute, before becoming a full professor at the universities in 1993 when she was already teaching at Lumière University Lyon 2. Within the Department of Music and Musicology of the Faculty of Arts, Language Sciences and Arts, she holds the pedagogical responsibility for the master's degree in research in arts (music and musicology).

She also holds a doctorate in aesthetics and art science, as well as degrees in classical literature, Romanian and Italian.

== Publications ==
Biographies

- Mounet-Sully : l'homme aux cent cœurs d'homme, éditions du Cerf, series "Histoire", Paris, 2005, 620 p. + 16 p. of illustrated plates, ISBN 2-204-07802-6, BnF 40133023n
- Paul Mounet : le tragédien qui parlait aux étoiles, éditions du Cerf, series "Biographie", Paris, 2009, 506 p.,ISBN 978-2-204-08868-8, BnF 42085923r

Musicology

- Les Instruments du quatuor : technique et interprétation, éditions La Flûte de Pan, Paris, 1986, 224 p., ISBN 2-903267-24-3, BnF 34975155p
- Les instruments à archet dans les musiques du XXe siècle, éditions Honoré Champion, series "Musique-musicologie" issue21-22, Paris, 1992, 399 p., ISBN 2-85203-223-6, BnF 355382094
- Du baroque à l'époque contemporaine : aspects des instruments à archet (selected writings chosen and presented by Anne Penesco), éditions Honoré Champion, series "Musique-musicologie" issue 23, Paris, 1993, 192 p., ISBN 2-85203-305-4, BnF 356097486
- Études sur la musique française : autour de Debussy, Ravel et Paul Le Flem (selected writings chosen and presented by Anne Penesco), Presses universitaires de Lyon, series "Cahiers du Centre de recherches musicologiques", Lyon, 1994, 107 p., ISBN 2-7297-0503-1, BnF 357391350
- Itinéraires de la musique française : théorie, pédagogie et création (selected writings chosen and presented by Anne Penesco), Presses universitaires de Lyon, series "Cahiers du Centre de recherches musicologiques", Lyon, 1996, 234 p., BnF 36688950v
- Défense et illustration de la virtuosité (selected writings chosen and presented by Anne Penesco), Presses universitaires de Lyon, series "Cahiers du Centre de recherches musicologiques", Lyon, 1997, 213 p., ISBN 2-7297-0547-3, BnF 37065887w
- Georges Enesco et l'âme roumaine (with a foreword by Yehudi Menuhin), Presses universitaires de Lyon, series "Cahiers du Centre de recherches musicologiques", Lyon, 1999, 90 p., ISBN 2-7297-0610-0, BnF 370382818
- Mounet-Sully et la partition intérieure, Presses universitaires de Lyon, series "Cahiers du Centre de recherches musicologiques", Lyon, 2000, 149 p., ISBN 2729706445, BnF 371059602

Copublications

- Charles Wagner, L'homme est une espérance de Dieu : anthologie (selected writings chosen and presented by Anne Penesco and Geoffroy de Turckheim, with a foreword by Patrick Cabanel), coedition Van Dieren et Église réformée de la Bastille Foyer de l'âme, series "Débats" issue 8, Paris, 2007, 173 p., ISBN 978-2-911087-60-8, BnF 41098430f
