= Élisabeth Du Réau =

French historian and professor (1937–2021)

Élisabeth du Réau de La Gaignonnière
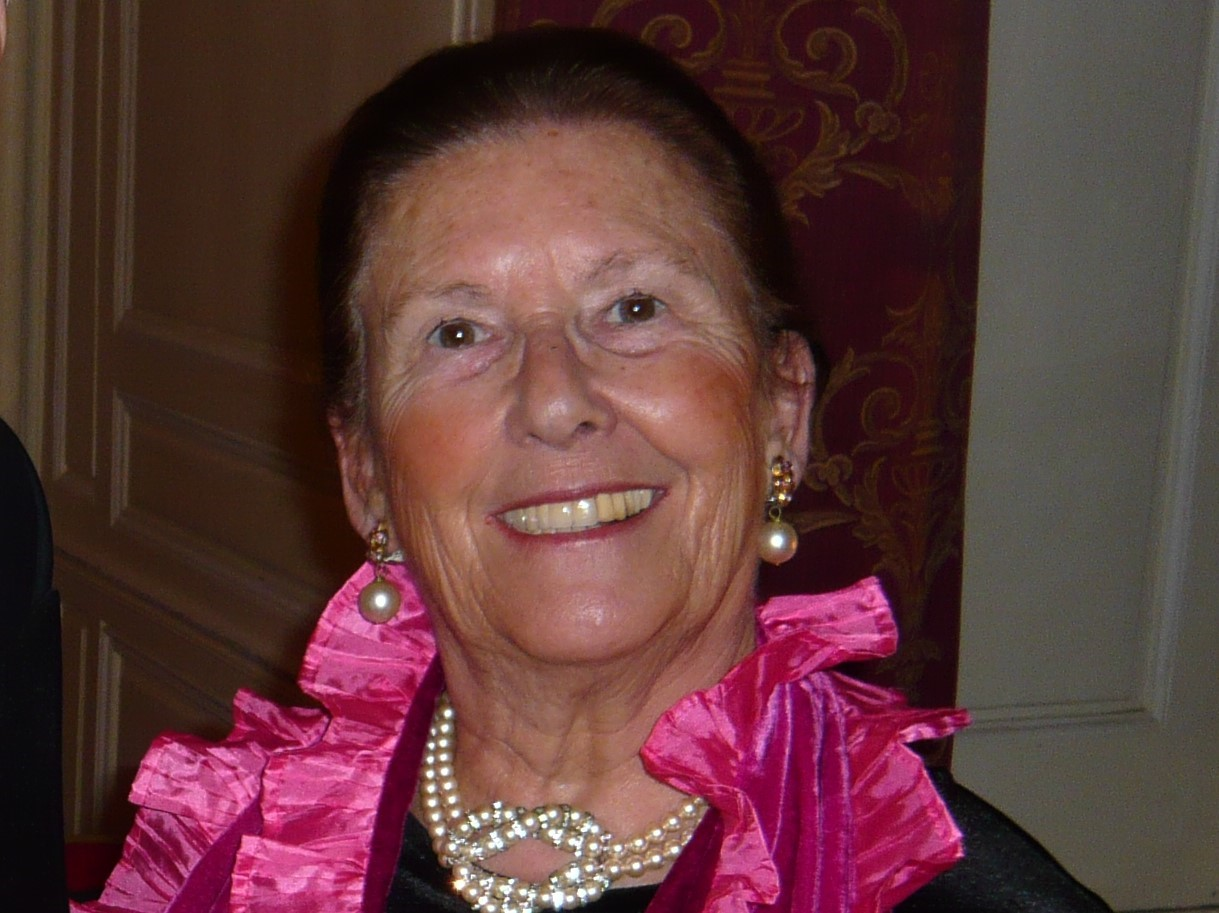
- Born: Élisabeth d'Armand de Chateauvieux; 6 February 1937; Nancy
- Died: 6 February 2021 (aged 84); Paris
- Occupations: Historian; Professor

Élisabeth du Réau, née de Chateauvieux (6 February 1937 – 6 February 2021), was a French historian and professor of international relations and contemporary history. She is well known for her biography of French Prime Minister Édouard Daladier, and her work on the construction of the European identity. She had a twenty-year career as a high school history instructor before embarking on an academic career spanning over thirty years.

== Biography ==
=== Childhood and education ===
Born Élisabeth de Chateauvieux in 1937, she began her university studies in Angers in 1956, then continued at the University of Rennes. She completed her bachelor's degree in history in Paris, at the Sorbonne, in 1961. Marriage and children then interrupted her studies until 1965.

She was awarded a master's with highest honors (mention très bien) in 1968, then passed the competitive agrégation exam in history-geography in 1969. She earned her doctorate in contemporary history from the University of Paris 1 Pantheon-Sorbonne in 1987, again with highest honors (mention très honorable). Her dissertation, an eight-volume study of Édouard Daladier called “Edouard Daladier et la sécurité de la France 1933-1940”, was supervised by Jean-Baptiste Duroselle. In 1993 she published a condensed version as a biography of Daladier, Édouard Daladier, 1884-1970. This, as well as her 1996 book, Histoire de l’idée européenne au XX^{e} siècle (transl. History of the idea of Europe in the 20th century), became the works for which she is best known.

=== Career ===
Beginning in 1960, Du Réau taught in private schools for 10 years. From 1970 until 1979 Du Réau taught high school business and history in Laon and then at Lycée Janson-de-Sailly in Paris. She was appointed as a lecturer in contemporary history at Le Mans University in 1980 and promoted to professor in 1989. She moved to the University of Sorbonne Nouvelle Paris 3 in 1993. She held a Jean Monnet Chair from 1998 until 2004. Her work initially focused on the history of French foreign policy, but came to include the history of European integration, making new contributions on the subjects of the interwar period, debates among intellectuals, and European security after World War II.

She led several doctoral programmes and research projects. One was a programme of collaboration between French, central and eastern European universities considering both academic and administrative development. Du Réau became vice-president of the University of Sorbonne Nouvelle Paris 3 from 1993 until 2005. She was vice-president of the Institute for the History of Contemporary International Relations and president of the Association des historiens contemporanéistes de l'enseignement supérieur et de la recherche from 1997 to 2006.

Du Réau took emerita status in 2005 but continued to lead doctoral seminars and supervise dissertations, overseeing more than a dozen in her retirement. In total, she directed 29 doctoral dissertations and presided the jury review of 8 doctoral dissertations in her career. Élisabeth du Réau died on 6 February 2021, the day of her 84th birthday.

== Publications ==
Du Réau was the author of several books including:

- Édouard Daladier, 1884-1970 (1993)
- L'idée d'Europe au XX^{e} siècle, des mythes aux réalités (1996)
- L'ordre mondial, de Versailles à San Francisco, juin 1919-juin 1945 (2007)
- La construction européenne au XX^{e} siècle: fondements, enjeux, défis (2007)

She also edited or co-edited several edited volumes, including:

- Europe des élites? Europe des peuples? La construction de l'espace européen (1945-1960) (1997)
- Dynamiques européennes. Nouvel espace, nouveaux acteurs: 1969-1981 (with Robert Frank, 2003)
- Dynamiques et résistances politiques dans le nouvel espace européen (with Christine Manigand, 2005)
- Vers la réunification de l’Europe, Apports et limites du processus d'’Helsinki de 1975 à nos jours (with Christine Manigand, 2005)
- Les débats autour de la constitution pour l'Europe, enjeux et perspectives 2005-2008 (with Alain Laquièze, 2007)
- Maréchal Jean de Lattre - Ne Pas Subir, Écrits 1914-1952 (with André Kaspi, Marc Michel, Guy Pedroncini, 1984)
