= Bertrand Lançon =

French historian and novelist

- Born: 1952 (age 73–74); Le Mans, France
- Education: University of Maine
- Occupations: Historian, novelist
- Known for: Studies on late Antiquity

Bertrand Lançon (born 1952, Le Mans) is a French historian and novelist, a specialist of late Antiquity.

== Career ==
After studying with the Jesuits, he went on to pursue higher education at the University of Maine, where he discovered late Antiquity with Jacques Biarne. After he was a professor of history in 1976 at the secondary level, he entered higher education in 1989 as an attaché temporaire d'enseignement et de recherche at the University of Maine.

In 1991, in Sorbonne, he defended his Ph.D. thesis under the direction of Charles Pietri, the then director of the École française de Rome: Maladies, malades et thérapeutes en Gaule du IIIe au VIe. He taught Ancient History at the University of Valenciennes and Hainaut-Cambresis (Valenciennes, Cambrai) from 1993 to 1996, then between 1996 and 2012 at the University of Western Brittany, Brest and Quimper. Since 2012, he has been a Professor of Roman History at the University of Limoges.

== University publications ==
At the request of François Hartog and John Scheid, he wrote his first book, Le monde romain tardif in 1992. With this book and the rest, he took up the "battle" initiated by Henri-Irénée Marrou against the received ideas about the so-called "decadence" of the Roman Empire. He then combined textbooks for students and articles on illness and healing in the Roman world as well as various mental and cultural aspects of the late Roman society. His field of investigation is that of mentalities, behavior, culture and religiosity in a Roman society in the process of Christianization.

In the course of his research, he conceived the neologism "nosomonde" to designate the perception of the world by Christians - in this case [Stoicism|Stoicians] - of late antiquity as intrinsically ill.

In 1995, he published Rome dans l'Antiquité tardive which presented itself as a continuation of the famous book by Jérôme Carcopino.

He also devoted himself to the study of certain Emperors of the 4th century such as Constantine the Great (in the series "Que sais-je ?" or Theodosius I (379-395).

With Benoît Jeanjean, Bertrand Lançon is at the origin of the French translation of the "Chronique" of Jerome, first part of Chroniques latines de l'Antiquité tardive et du haut Moyen Âge whose translation and commentary were provided by the study group set up in Brest in 1998 with Hervé Oudart, the Gestiat (Groupe d'études sur les sources textuelles et iconographiques de l'Antiquité tardive), followed in 2013/2014y by volume 2 of these chronicles, those of Marcellinus d'Illyricum (379-534).

From 31 May 2007 to 2 June 2007, he gathered in Brest an international symposium on Le sens du poil : histoire et anthropologie de la chevelure et de la pilosité, which attracted the interest of researchers from several disciplines. The proceedings of this colloquium, gathered by Marie-Hélène Delavaud-Roux, were published by L'Harmattan in 2011.

In collaboration with Tiphaine Moreau, he published Les premiers chrétiens (Collection des Idées Reçues du Cavalier Bleu), as well as a new biography of Constantine the Great (2012) : Constantin, Auguste chrétien (Armand Colin).

With Adeline Gargam, a specialist in French literature of the 18th century, he published a book on L'histoire de la misogynie (Arkhè, 2013). His most recent work is a biography of Theodosius (Paris, Éditions Perrin, 2014).

Several of his books have been translated into English, Italian, Portuguese, Romanian, Spanish and Japanese.

== Novels ==
In 2006, Bertrand Lançon also began publishing a series of novels entitled Les Enquêtes de Festus, whose main character is a Roman investigator of the generation of Augustine of Hippo. The two first volumes, Le Complot des Parthiques and Le Prix des chiens, were followed in 2007 by a third one, Le rire des Luperques. He describes himself as the author of "Roman detective novels", taking place in an era of "pre-industrial polar (detective novel)" where Christianity and the "barbaric" immigration create a social and cultural boiling peculiar to late antiquity. Several years apart, the investigations make it possible to confront an aging character to the major events of his time, as well as to the displacements in the different countries of the vast Empire.

== Personal life ==
In addition to his other activities, while studying the lute with Xavier Cauhépé, Bertrand Lançon gave the first French translation of the "Treatise of the lute" by Vincenzo Capirola (Venice, 1506) in Tablatures (revue de la Société française de luth). He also founded the association "Lucs & Guiternes", which organized lectures and lute concerts in western France during the 1980s.

== Bibliography ==
- 1992: Le monde romain tardif IIIe-VIIe après J.-C.). Cursus. Paris: Armand Colin. 1992. p. 191. ISBN 2-200-21235-6.
- 1995: Rome dans l'Antiquité tardive (312-604 après J.-C.). La vie quotidienne : civilisations et sociétés. Paris: Hachette. 1995. p. 252. ISBN 2-01-235115-8..
- 1997: L'Antiquité tardive, Paris, PUF, coll. "Que sais-je ?"
- 1998: Constantin (306-337). Que sais-je ?. Paris: PUF. 1998. p. 128. ISBN 2-13-049656-3. Archived from the original on 2015-04-02.
- 2004: Saint Jérôme, Chronique, (with Benoît Jeanjean), Rennes, Presses Universitaires de Rennes
- 2009: Moreau, Tiphaine (2009). Les premiers chrétiens. Idées reçues. Paris: Éditions du Cavalier Bleu. p. 128. ISBN 978-2-84670-281-2.
- 2011 Histoire et anthropologie du poil et de la pilosité. Le sens du poil, (ed. with Marie-Hélène Delavaud-Roux), Paris, L'Harmattan
- 2012: Constantin. Un Auguste chrétien, (with Tiphaine Moreau), Paris, Armand Colin
- 2013: Histoire de la misogynie, (with Adeline Gargam), Paris, Arkhè
- 2014: Théodose, Paris, Perrin, 393 p.
