= Gérard Le Vot =

French musicologist

Gérard Le Vot (born 5 January 1948) is a French musicologist, a specialist in the medieval period, and professor at the Lumière University Lyon 2.

Also a harpist and singer, he was awarded with the following prizes for his recordings of songs by troubadours and trouvères:

- 1981: Grand Prix of the Académie Charles-Cros.
- 1987: Prize Paul Zumthor.

He is also the author of – Vocabulaire de la musique médiévale Minerve, 1993, 2001, 255 p. – L'Oeuvre lyrique de Blondel de Nesle. Mélodies. Edited with Avner Bahat éd. Champion, Paris, 1996, 222 p. – Troubadours and Trouvères Songs, An Anthology of Poems and Melodies, Edited with Margaret Switten & Sam N. Rosenberg, Garland, New-York, 1998, 378 p. – Bruit et Musique, Textes recueillis et présentés par Gérard Le Vot, Actes de la journée d’étude du 23 janvier 2008, éd. Gérard Streletski, Publications du département de musicologie, Lyon, 2009, 326 p. – Poétique du rock, oralité, voix et tumultes, Minerve, 2017, 203 p. – Les Troubadours, les chansons et leur musique (XIIe-XIIIe siècles), Minerve, 2019, 393 p. – Chansons d’amour des troubadours. Une anthologie texte et musique, Minerve, Paris, 2022, 263 p.
