= Dominique Gonnet =

Belgian Jesuit professor

- Born: 1950 (age 74–75)
- Alma mater: Centre Sèvres
- Occupation: Catholic priest
- Employer: History and Sources of the Ancient Worlds; Institut des sources chrétiennes; French National Centre for Scientific Research; Lumière University Lyon 2; Sources Chrétiennes; Éditions du Cerf

Dominique Gonnet (born in 1950) is a Jesuit professor and a researcher at Institut des sources chrétiennes. He is a founding member of the Société d'études syriaques and has co-edited, in its collection of studies, Les Pères grecs dans la tradition syriaque.

== Biography ==
Gonnet was born in 1950 in Belgium.

=== Education ===
In 1970, Gonnet graduated in Classics at the University of Lille. In 1971, Gonnet earned a CAPES in Classical Letters, and then, from 1976, a master's degree in linguistics. He studied at the Hebrew University of Jerusalem (1972-1973) and He entered the Society of Jesus in 1973. From 1993, Gonnet holds a ThD at Centre Sèvres, with his thesis La liberté religieuse à Vatican II : la contribution de John Courtney Murray, SJ.

=== Teaching ===
Since 1992 he has worked at the Institut des sources chrétiennes in Lyon as a research engineer associated with the Unité Mixte de Recherche HiSoMA (Histoire et Sources des Mondes Antiques, CNRS-Université Lyon 2). Gonnet has been teaching Syriac since 1993 for the University of Lyon 2. He is a Student chaplain and theology teacher in Aix and Toulon (in 1990). He also leads a Syriac seminar by videoconference at Sources Chrétiennes, which allows for further study of the language and literature.

=== Writings ===
Gonnes is author of several articles in the Syriac field. In the same collection, he published an article in The New Testament in Syriac as well as several others concerning different Syriac authors from Ephrem to Bar Hebraeus. With Jean Pflieger, he finalized the French translation of J. Healey's manual.

Since 1992 he has worked at the Institut des Sources Chrétiennes in Lyon as a research engineer associated with the Unité Mixte de Recherche HiSoMA (Histoire et Sources des Mondes Antiques, CNRS-Université Lyon 2).

== Works ==
=== Thesis ===
- Gonnet, Dominique (1994). La liberté religieuse à Vatican II : la contribution de John Courtney Murray, SJ (Dissertation: Thèse--Théologie--Paris--Centre Sèvres). Cogitatio fidei. Vol. 183. Paris : Les Éd. du Cerf. OCLC 463901251.

=== Books ===
- Dominique Gonnet (1990). Dieu aussi connaît la souffrance. Théologies. Paris: Cerf. ISBN 9782204040556. OCLC 397249856.
- Andrea B Schmidt; Dominique Gonnet; Société d'études syriaques; Institut orientaliste de Louvain (2007). Les pères grecs dans la tradition syriaque. Études syriaques. Vol. 4. Paris : Geuthner. ISBN 9782705337995. OCLC 181826849.
- Daniele Gianotti; Dominique Gonnet; Michel Fédou; François-Marie Humann; Claude Dagens (2013). Ressourcement: les Pères de l'Eglise et Vatican II: conférences pour le 70e anniversaire des "Sources chrétiennes" et le 50e anniversaire du concile, réunies par les "Sources chrétiennes" et la Faculté de théologie de Lyon. Paris: Les éditions du Cerf. ISBN 9782204101677. OCLC 870641573.
- Dominique Gonnet (2014). Les pères de l'Eglise aux sources de l'Europe. Paris: Cerf. ISBN 9782204100809. OCLC 898071415.
- Jean-Paul Vesco; Dominique Gonnet; Luc Forestier (2014). La liberté religieuse en question: de Vatican II à aujourd'hui. Carte blanche. Paris: Salvator. ISBN 9782706711190. OCLC 887537269.

=== Articles ===
- Gonnet, D (1996-06-01). "La liberté religieuse à Vatican II (Book Review)". Theological Studies. 57 (2). Woodstock, Md.: 359. doi:10.1177/004056399605700223. S2CID 220489642.
