= Esteban Gonnet =

- Born: Victor Etienne Gonnet; September 3, 1829; Grenoble, France
- Died: March 30, 1868 (aged 38); Buenos Aires, Argentina
- Occupation: Photographer

Victor Etienne Gonnet (September 3, 1829 – March 30, 1868) better known as Esteban Gonnet, was a French photographer who emigrated to Argentina, where he focused his work as a photographer.

== Biography ==
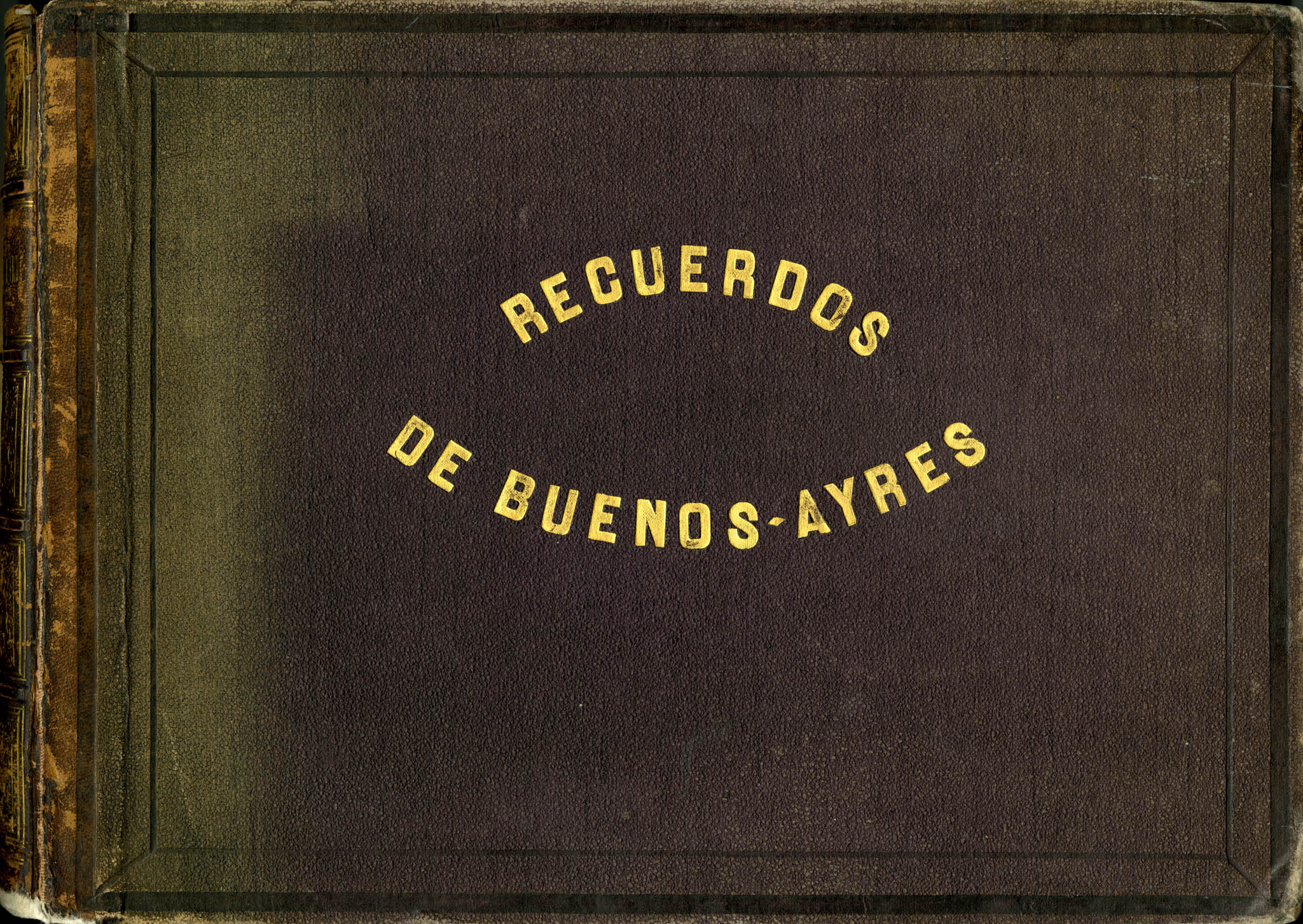
First edition of Recuerdos de Buenos Ayres, a book with photographies by Gonnet, published in 1864

Born in Grenoble, France, Gonnet moved to Argentina from Newcastle, England, in 1857. His brother, Louis Gonnet, that worked in a printing house, lived in Argentina and was the father of Manuel B. Gonnet. Gonnet was officer of the French Navy in 1845. In October 1855 he served in the merchant marine and earned a master in Dundee, Scotland.

Gonnet became a photographer after arriving in Buenos Aires in 1857. He was a surveyor, working with his cousin Hippolyte Gaillard, also a surveyor.

Gonnet's work reflected the rural lifetime and customs, showing the life and customs of aboriginal people and paisanos of that era, although Gonnet also took photographies in urban places. In most of his photography he tried to show the typical image of the creole, stereotyping Argentine customs, and using objects as symbols that would create iconic images of the era. His photos were then sold abroad (mostly in Europe), when photography of travels or distant places where gaining in popularity.

Gonnet's innovative style of work consisted of the use of negative system rather than daguerreotype (that was the most common technique by then). Furthermore, Gonnet usually chose to take pictures outdoors instead of working at a studio, which was also his hallmark.

In 1864 his photos were used to make lithographs and were also published in several newspapers. Also that year, Gonnet published two photograph books, Recuerdos de Buenos-Ayres (regarded as the oldest album dedicated to Buenos Aires) and Recuerdos de la Campaña de Buenos-Ayres, consisting of 20 photos each. For a long time, those albums were wrongly credited to Gonnet's colleague Benito Panunzi.

He died on March 30, 1868, in the city of Buenos Aires as the result of an aneurysm; the French sculptor Elias Duteil was a witness.

== Gallery ==
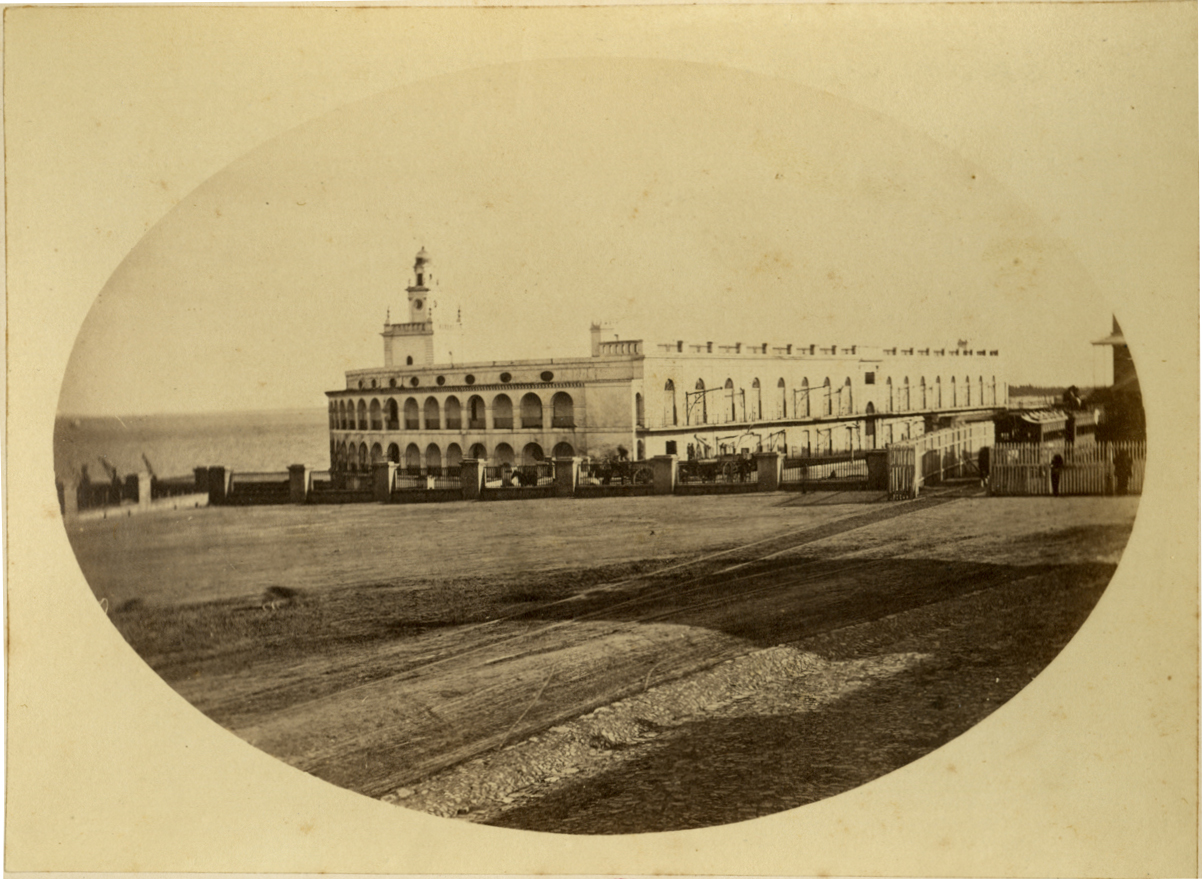
Aduana nueva

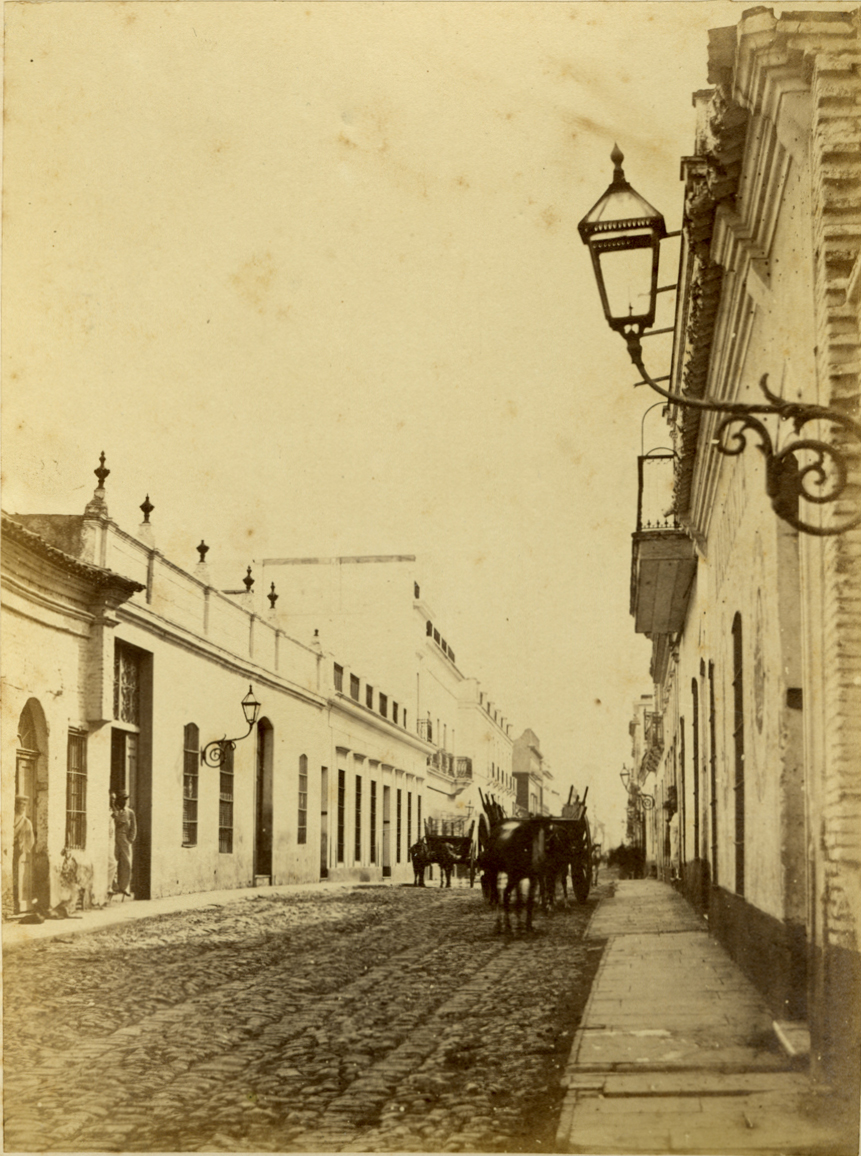
Calle de la Piedad

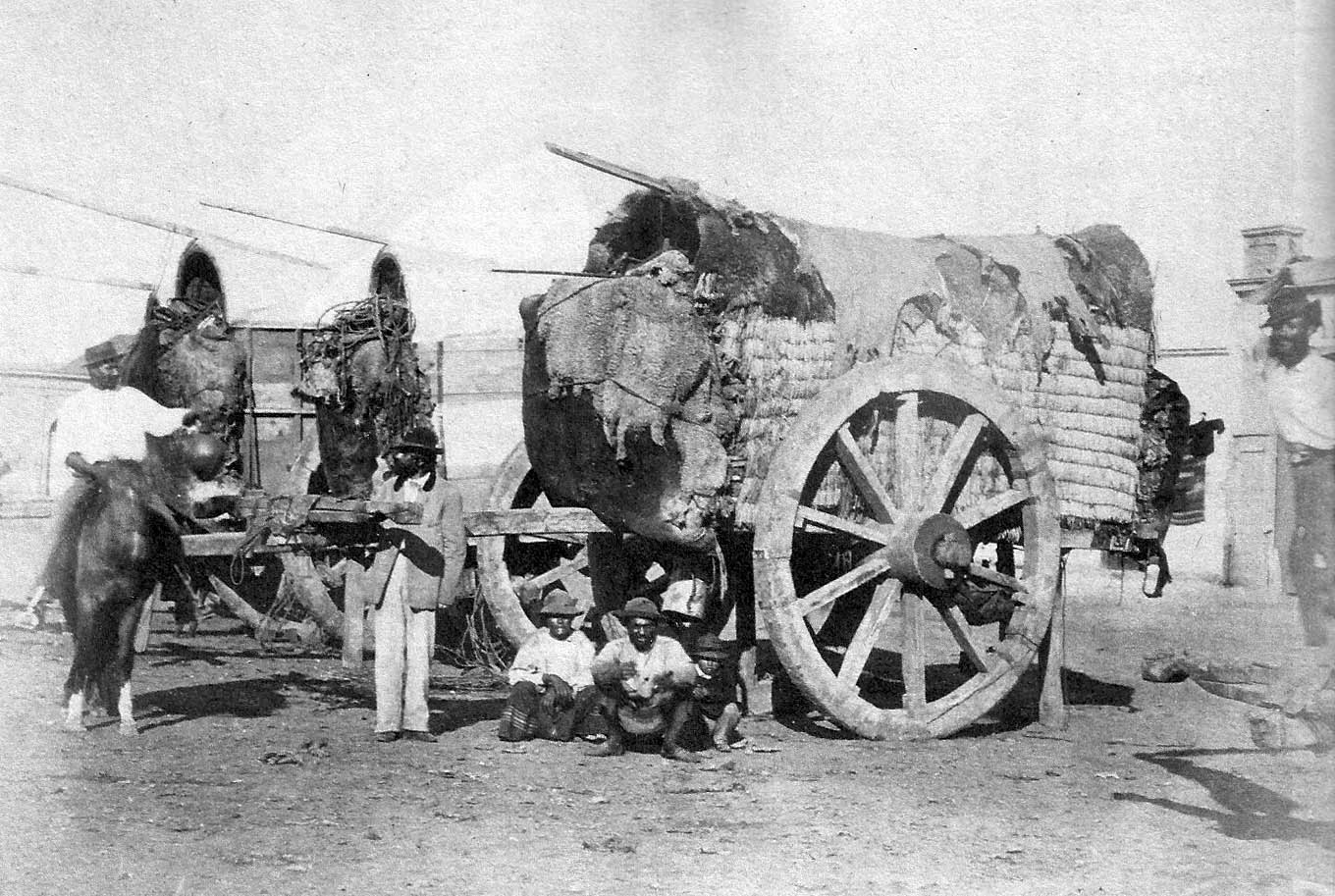
Carretas

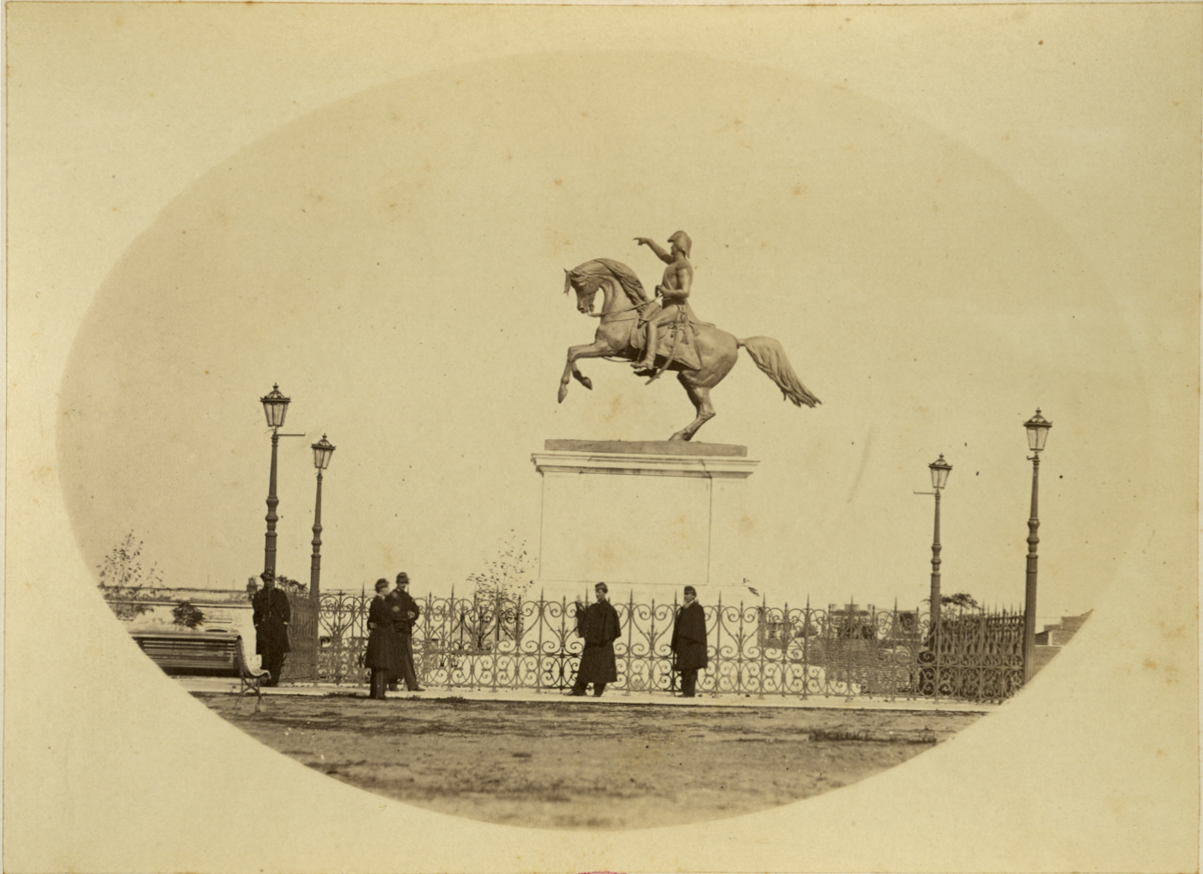
Monument to José de San Martín

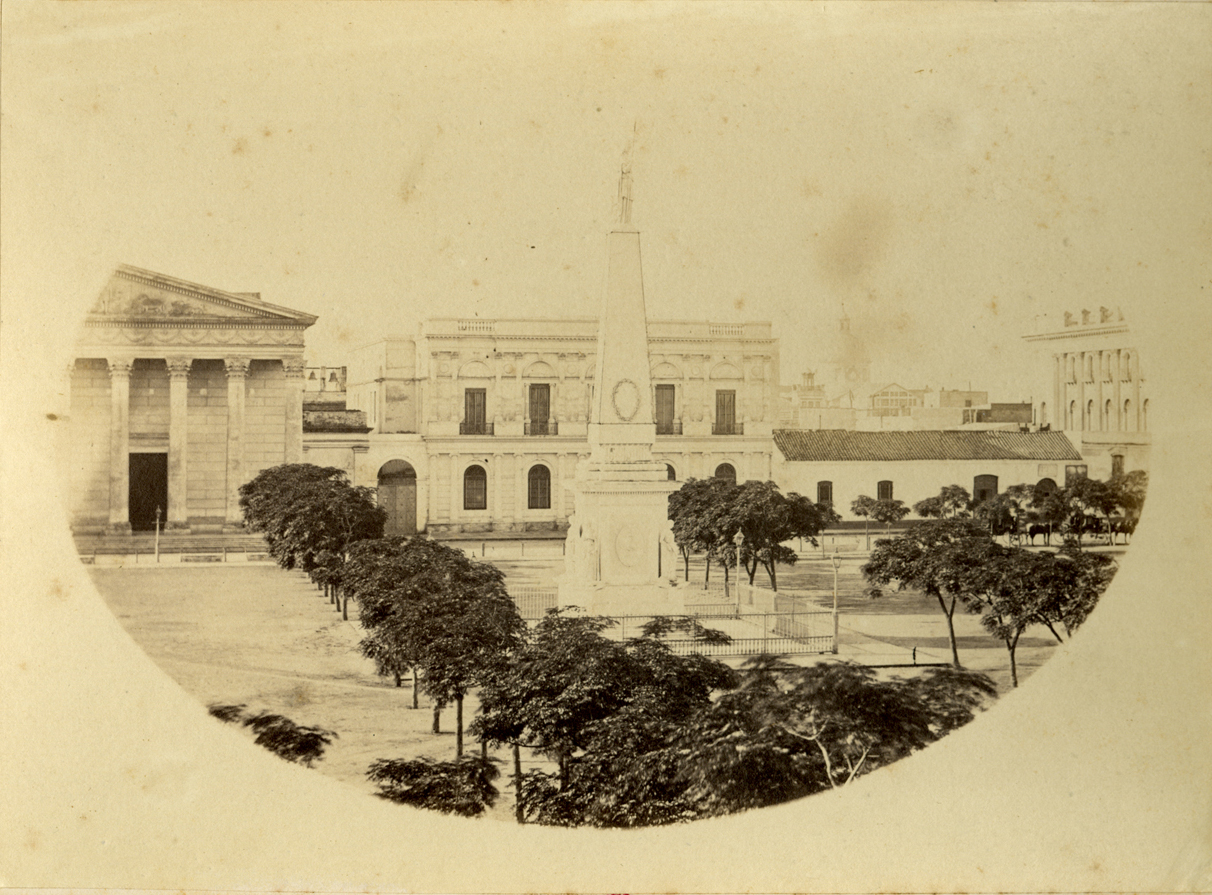
Pirámide de Mayo

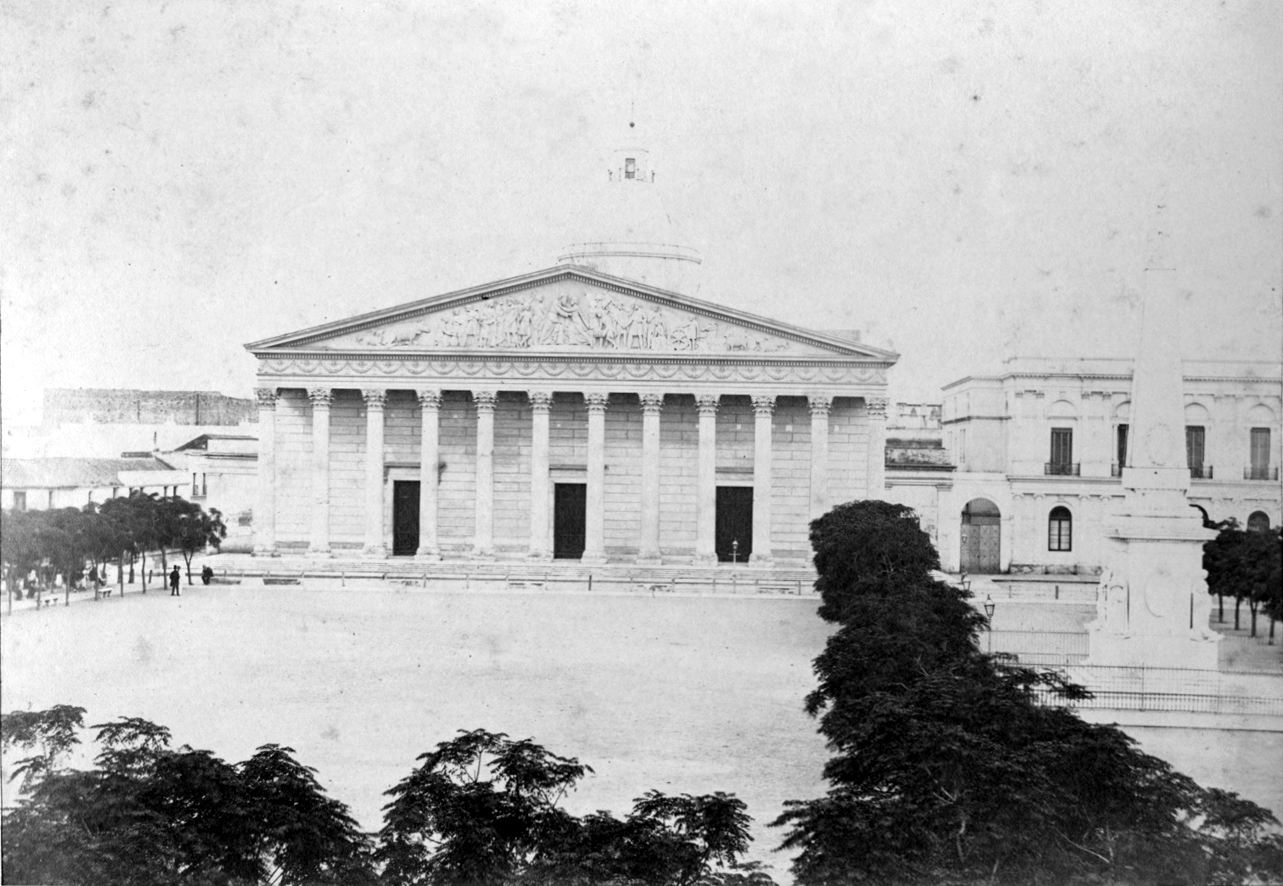
Cathedral of Buenos Aires

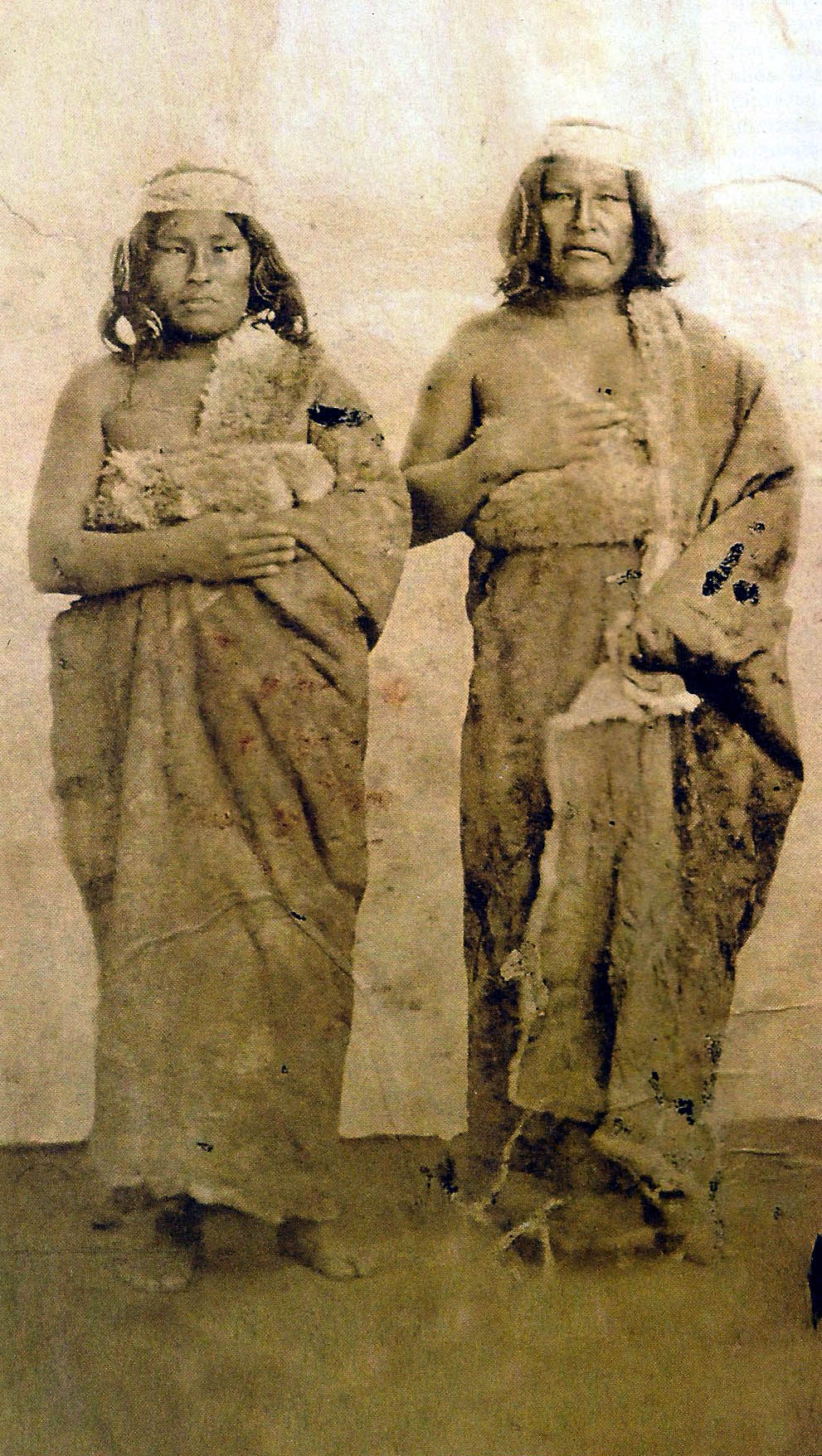
Tehuelche people

== Bibliography ==
- La Fotografía en la Historia Argentina, Volume I - Clarín-AGEA. first edition. Buenos Aires. 2005
- Buenos Aires ciudad y campaña. Fotografías de Esteban Gonnet, Benito Panunzi y otros 1860-1870. Fundación Antorchas. Buenos Aires. 2001
- La fotografía en la Argentina. Su historia y evolución en el siglo XIX. 1840-1899. Abadía Editora. Buenos Aires. 1986
