= Mino di Graziano =

Italian painter

Mino di Graziano (1289–1323) was an Italian painter, active in Siena. He is said to have painted frescoes in the Sala del Consiglio of the Palazzo Pubblico of Siena. On 4 December 1310, di Graziano and two other painters (Sebastiano Rama and Mino Prete) were summoned before a judge for non-payment of rent for a house. The three painters were probably collaborating and using the house as a workshop.
