= Vibersviller =

- Commune
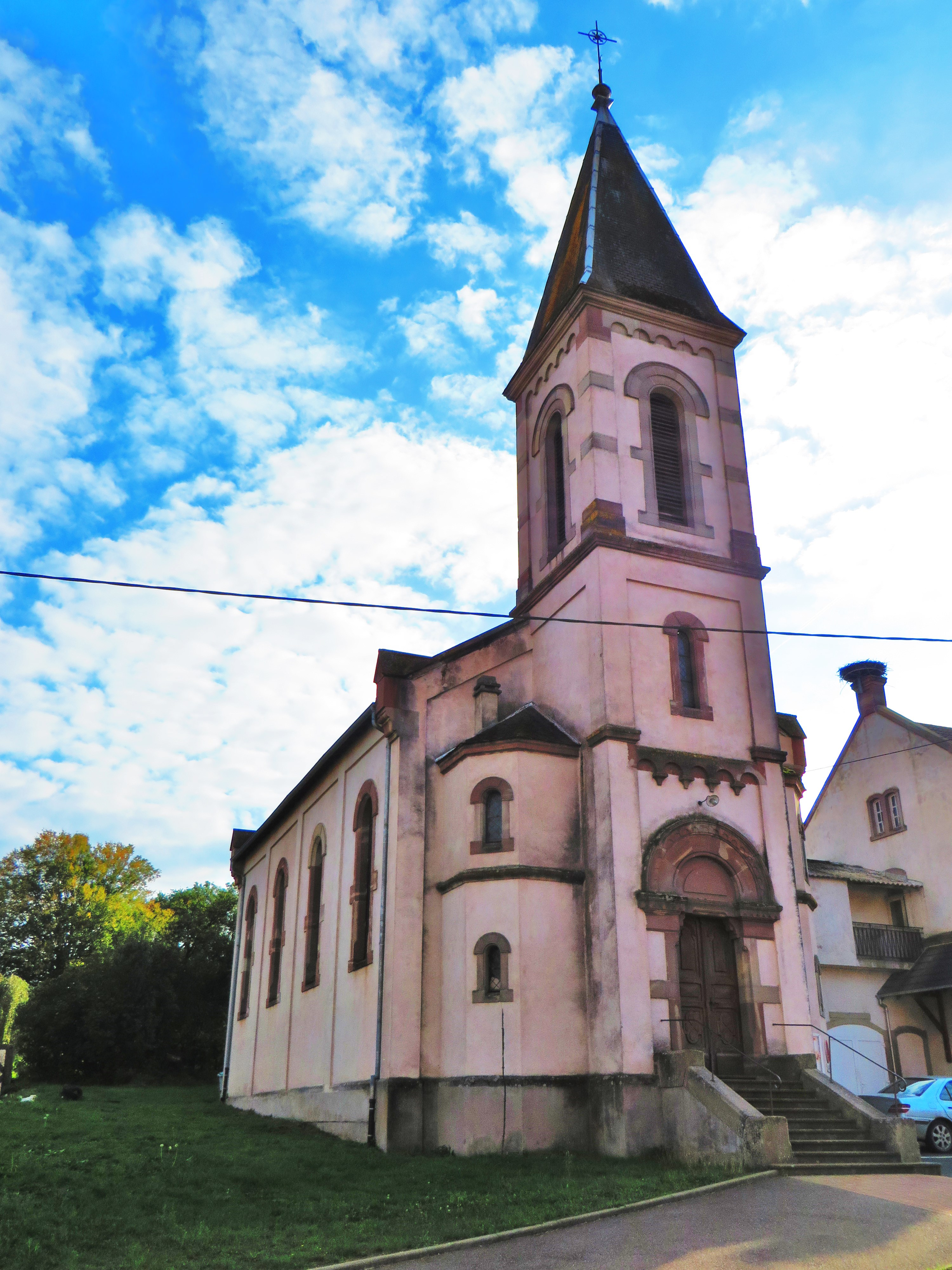
- The Lutheran church in Vibersviller

- Coat of arms
- Location of Vibersviller
- Location within France Location within Grand Est
- Coordinates: 48°54′54″N 6°56′42″E
- Country: France
- Region: Grand Est
- Department: Moselle
- Arrondissement: Sarrebourg-Château-Salins
- Canton: Le Saulnois
- Intercommunality: CC du Saulnois

Government
  - Mayor (2020–2026): Valérie Klein
- Area^{1}: 13.02 km^{2} (5.03 sq mi)
- Elevation: 322 m (1,056 ft)
- Highest elevation: 266 m (873 ft)
- Lowest elevation: 216 m (709 ft)
- Population (2023): 381
  - Density: 29.3/km^{2} (75.8/sq mi)
- Time zone: UTC+01:00 (CET)
  - Summer (DST): UTC+02:00 (CEST)
- INSEE/Postal code: 57711 /57670
- ^{1} French Land Register data, which excludes lakes, ponds, glaciers > 1 km^{2} (0.386 sq mi or 247 acres) and river estuaries.

Vibersviller (French pronunciation: [vibɛʁsvilɛʁ]; German: Wiebersweiler) is a commune in the Moselle department in Grand Est in north-eastern France.

== See also ==
- Communes of the Moselle department
