= Manlio Graziano =

Italian geopolitics scholar

Manlio Graziano is an Italian scholar specializing in geopolitics and geopolitics of religions. He lives in Paris.

== Life ==
Graziano graduated with first-class honors in French literature from the University of Turin, the city in which he then taught for several years. After moving to France, he obtained his doctorate in Italian studies from the University Stendhal-Grenoble III, defending a thesis about Italian political identity.

Thanks to the French geopolitician Michel Korinman and to Lucio Caracciolo, editor of the Italian geopolitical journal Limes, he entered the world of geopolitical studies, in which he specializes in geopolitics of religions.

He teaches at the Paris Institute of International Affairs, Sciences Po, at the Sorbonne and at the College of Europe. He regularly publishes in Limes, and he has also collaborated with the journals Foreign Policy, Modern Italy, Geopolitical Affairs, International Affairs Forum, Heartland, Outre-Terre, as well as with the Corriere della Sera and Il Sole 24 Ore. The American edition of his book on Italian political identity, The Failure of Italian Nationhood, was reviewed by The New Yorker and The Economist. In June 2015 he was invited by the UN Correspondents Association to discuss his thesis about the geopolitics of religion at the United Nations headquarters in New York City.

In 2021 he published Mondo birbetta!, a literary entertainment.

== Academic career ==
Besides Sciences Po, La Sorbonne and the College of Europe, Graziano teaches at the École des hautes études commerciales de Paris (HEC), and at the Geneva Institute of Geopolitics. He also gives lectures at the Bicocca University (Milan) and at the universities of Évry and Versailles, in the Parisian region. Previously, he worked at the American Graduate School in Paris, at the four campuses of the Skema Business School (Paris, Sophia Antipolis, Lille, Suzhou), at the École supérieure de traduction et relations internationales (ESTRI) in Lyon, at la Sorbonne-Nouvelle, and at the universities of Nanterre, Grenoble III, Tours, and Lyon II. He has given lectures and courses at the University of Turin, at the İstanbul Bilgi Üniversitesi, at Hofstra University, at Stony Brook University, at Brooklyn College, at the University of Glasgow, at the KU Leuven, at the Stockholms universitet, at the University of Bath and at the Libera Università Internazionale degli Studi Sociali (LUISS) in Rome.

== Works ==
- Come si va in guerra. Propaganda, interessi, ideologie: cosa infiamma lo scontro tra potenze, Mondadori, Segrate, 2026
- THE POST-MADURO WORLD: POLICY OR PIRACY? A Tentative Hypotesis on a Possible U.S. International Strategy - Short Essay
- Disordine mondiale. Perché viviamo in un'epoca di crescente caos, Milano, Mondadori, 2024
- Geopolitica della paura. Come l'ansia sociale orienta le scelte politiche, Egea Bocconi Editore, 2021
- Geopolitics of International Relations in the 21st Century, in English and in French, Paris, 2020
- Geopolitica. Orientarsi nel grande disordine internazionale, Il Mulino, Bologna, 2019
- L'isola al centro del mondo. Una geopolitica degli Stati Uniti, Il Mulino, Bologna, 2018
- What Is a Border?, Stanford University Press, 2018 (original version: Frontiere, Il Mulino, Bologna, 2017)
- In Rome We Trust: The Rise of Catholics in American Political Life, Stanford University Press, 2017 (original version: In Rome We Trust. Cattolici e politica negli Stati Uniti, Il Mulino, Bologna, 2016)
- Holy Wars and Holy Alliance: The Return of Religion to the Global Political Stage, Columbia University Press, 2017 (original version: Guerra santa e santa alleanza. Religioni e disordine internazionale nel XXI secolo, Il Mulino, Bologna, 2015)
- Essential Geopolitics: A Handbook. Manuel essentiel de géopolitique, Manlio Graziano, 2011 (in English and in French)
- Il secolo cattolico. La strategia geopolitica della Chiesa, Laterza editore, Roma, 2010 (Spanish edition: El siglo católico. La estrategia geopolítica de la Iglesia, RBA Libros, Barcelona, 2012)
- The Failure of Italian Nationhood: The Geopolitics of a Troubled Identity, Palgrave-Macmillan, New York, 2010 (original version: L’Italie. Un État sans nation ? Géopolitique d’une identité nationale incertaine, Ed. Eres, Ramonville, Bibliothèque géopolitique, 2007; Italian edition : Senza nazione? Geopolitica di un’identità difficile, Donzelli editore, Rome, 2007)
- Identité italienne et identité catholique. L’Italie laboratoire de l’Église, L’Harmattan, Paris, 2007
- (Editor) L’Italie aujourd’hui. Situation et perspectives après le séisme des années quatre-vingt-dix, L’Harmattan, Paris, 2004, with texts by Bruno Bongiovanni, Sabino Cassese, Valerio Castronovo, Michèle Merger, Christophe Mileschi, Gianfranco Pasquino, Paolo Rampini, Daniela Rechenmann, Sergio Romano, Vera Negri Zamagni and Alberto Toscano.
