= Stéphane Pedrazzi =

French journalist (born 1978)

Stéphane Pedrazzi is a French television and radio journalist, currently hosting the morning show "La matinale éco" on Radio Classique. He previously worked for American television channels, including for CNBC as its Paris correspondent and bureau chief.

== Biography ==
Stephane Pedrazzi started his journalistic career as a presenter on Lyon's Classic FM radio station.

In 1997, he was recruited by Bloomberg for the launch of the French-language edition of Bloomberg Television, based in London. Between 2004 and 2007, he served as an anchor for the daily morning programme "Matin Bourse", having previously worked as a reporter and presenter for other Bloomberg programs.

In January 2007, Pedrazzi joined the US business news channel CNBC as Paris correspondent and bureau chief, ahead of the French presidential election. Beginning in 2010, he also reported regularly from Madrid, Spain, to cover the European debt crisis. He remained with CNBC until December 2015.

== BFM Business and Radio Classique ==
Pedrazzi joined BFM Business in 2019, where he anchored several news programs, including the flagship morning show "Good Morning Business" during the summer. During this period he was also a regular contributor to other Altice Media outlets, including BFMTV and RMC.

In September 2024, he was appointed anchor and editor-in-chief of the morning program "La Matinale éco" on Radio Classique, a station owned by the French luxury group LVMH. Radio Classique claims to have significantly improved the ratings of its morning show, listened to daily by nearly 400.000 people.
