= Embalo =

Embalo is a Bissau-Guinean surname. Notable people with the surname include:

- Adulai Djabi Embalo (born 2005), Luxembourgish footballer
- Alfayaya Embalo (born 1977), Cape Verdean sprinter
- Carlos Embaló (born 1994), Bissau-Guinean footballer
- Filomena Embaló (born 1956), Bissau-Guinean writer
- José Embaló (born 1993), Bissau-Guinean footballer
- Mutaro Embalo (born 1992), Bissau-Guinean footballer
- Talata Embalo (born 1963), Bissau-Guinean wrestler
- Umaro Embaló (born 2001), Portuguese footballer
- Umaro Sissoco Embaló (born 1972), president of Guinea-Bissau
