= Ioan Horga =

- Citizenship: Romanian
- Occupation: University Professor
- Board member of: Vice-President of the Romanian Association for International Relations and European Studies

Academic background
- Education: University of Reims Champagne-Ardenne
- Thesis: L'Église gréco-catholique roumaine (uniate) de Transylvanie à l'époque des Lumières. L'évêché d'Oradea (1780-1830) (1995)
- Doctoral advisor: Viviane Barrie-Curien

Academic work
- Discipline: History, European studies
- Institutions: University of Oradea

Ioan Horga is a Romanian university professor of international relations and European studies and dean of the faculty of history, international relations, political science and communication science of the University of Oradea. He is also director of the Institute of Euro-Regional Studies Oradea/Debrecen, a Jean Monnet Centre of Excellence. He holds a Jean Monnet Chair in Euro-Regional Studies since 2002. He is also Vice President of Romanian Association for International Relations and European Studies (ARRISE). Since 2017 he is director of a Jean Monnet Network on the European Union and its neighbourhood, whose aim is to enhance the EU's actorness in the eastern borderlands.

== Background ==
Horga studied history at Babes Bolyai University in Cluj-Napoca, graduating in 1980 with the highest GPA of his class. He worked briefly as a high school teacher, before working for five years at the Directorate of the School of the Committee of the Union of Communist Youth in Bihor County. After the Romanian Revolution of 1989, he went back to work as a high school teacher until he joined the University of Oradea in 1993. In 1995 he obtained a doctorate in history from University of Reims Champagne-Ardenne, with a thesis on the Romanian Greek Catholic Church (United with Rome) of Transylvania during the Enlightenment Era: The episcopate of Oradea (1780-1830), under the supervision of Viviane Barrie-Curien. He thus became the first Romanian national to obtain a doctoral degree abroad after the 1989 Revolution.
