= Constantine B. Scouteris =

Greek theologian

- Κωνσταντίνος Β. Σκουτέρης
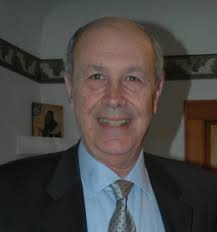
- Constantine Scouteris - at St. Tikhon's Seminary, Pennsylvania, during his Onassis Foundation-sponsored tour of the US in March-April 2006
- Born: 1939
- Died: 2009 (aged 69–70)
- Citizenship: Greek

Academic background
- Education: University of Athens, University of Strasbourg, University of Oxford, University of Bonn, University of Tübingen

Academic work
- Discipline: Theology
- Institutions: University of Athens, University of Balamand
- Main interests: Ecclesiology, Christian anthropology, Ecumenical movement
- Notable works: *The Ecclesiology of Saint Gregory of Nyssa* (1969); *The 39 Articles of the Church of England: Under the Light of the Orthodox Symbolic Tradition* (1982); *History of Doctrine* (Vols. I & II, 1998, 2004)

Constantine B. Scouteris (Greek: Κωνσταντίνος Β. Σκουτέρης; 1939–2009) was a Greek theologian and Emeritus Professor at the University of Athens.

== Biography ==
He studied Theology at the University of Athens and pursued post-graduate studies in France (Strasbourg), England (Oxford) and Germany (Bonn and Tübingen). He was awarded the Doctorate Degree of Theology from the University of Athens (1969), the Doctorate Degree from the Doctoral School of Theology and Religious Sciences of the University of Strasbourg (1969) and received Honorary Doctorate Degrees from the Universities of Oradea and Cluj-Napoca (Romania) and from the Moscow Theological Academy (Russia).

He was elected assistant professor of the Theological School (Faculty of Theology) at the University of Athens in 1973, Associate Professor in 1980, and Professor of History of Doctrine and Symbolic Theology in 1985.

Until his retirement, he taught the following courses: a) History of Doctrine, b) Theology of Creeds, Symbols and Doctrine and History of Ecumenical Movement, c) History of Theological Terminology and d) Christian Confessions.

He served as President of the Faculty of Theology (in two tenures, 1989-1991 and 1995–1997) and as Dean of the Theological School of Athens (2000-2004). During his first tenure as President of the Faculty of Theology, honorary doctorate degrees were awarded to: Metropolitan of Philadelphia Bartholomew Arhondonis (now Ecumenical Patriarch of Constantinople), Archbishop Iakovos of America (born Demetrios Koukouzis), Metropolitan of Switzerland Damaskinos Papandreou, Metropolitan of Corinth Panteleimon Karanikolas, Metropolitan of Kozani Dionysios Psarianos and Metropolitan of Messenia Chrysostomos Themelis.

He taught as a visiting professor at Holy Cross, Greek Orthodox School of Theology (Boston) (1984-1985), as well as from 1986 (and for 20 years) at the St. John of Damascus Institute of Theology of the University of Balamand (Lebanon). He was a member of the Board of the Bossey Ecumenical Institute in Geneva (1991-1998), a member of the Board of the Orthodox Center of the Ecumenical Patriarchate in Chambesy, Geneva, a member of the Academic Council and Professor of the Geneva Institute of Postgraduate Studies of Orthodox Theology. He was a visiting researcher at Harvard University (Harvard Divinity School) and served as a member of several committees for the election of professors and the review of doctoral dissertations at universities both abroad (Boston, Cambridge, Munich, Paris (College of France), Strasbourg, Bucharest, Craiova, Constanza, Cluj-Napoca, Alba Iulia and Targoviste, Theological Academy of Moscow, St. Tikhon's Orthodox University in Moscow, University of Yaroslav) and in Greece.

From 1974 onwards he was the representative of the Church of Greece in the International Committee for the Anglican-Orthodox Dialogue and has been a member of the Synodical Committee for Inter-Orthodox and Inter-Christian Relations and of the Special Synodical Committee for Bioethics. He was a member of many international academic associations, and in 2001, in recognition of his service to theological learning and the Church, he was elected member of the prestigious Académie Internationale des Sciences Religieuses. In many international, inter-Orthodox and inter-Christian conferences, he participated as a representative of the Ecumenical Patriarchate, the Patriarchates of Alexandria, Antioch, Jerusalem and the Church of Greece.

In 2006, following an invitation to the United States from the Alexander S. Onassis Scholarship Foundation, as a distinguished scholar, he lectured at the Universities of Berkeley (California), South Florida, St. Tikhon's Orthodox Theological Seminary (Pennsylvania) and Holy Cross (Massachusetts).

He received honourable distinctions from the Patriarchates of Antioch and Jerusalem. He was named "Archon Protonotarios" of the Ecumenical Patriarchate and served as President of the “Panagia Pammakaristos” Brotherhood of Archons.

In his obituary of Professor Scouteris, Professor Christopher Veniamin notes inter alia that "Constantine Scouteris was one of Greece’s foremost theologians, specializing in ecclesiology, the mystery of the Church as a theanthropic institution, and in Christian anthropology, the nature and purpose of human existence. Never swayed or distracted by the “fruit of the month” approach to theology, Scouteris was attuned to the more serious concerns of the day, and always focused on the perennial, ultimate questions of life. He was deeply convinced that communion – personal communion – was the key to world unity and peace. The burning question for Scouteris, therefore, was how to enter into real communion with others and attain to true unity." As to how Professor Scouteris viewed his vocation, this is perhaps best summarized by his own words: "the work of the theologian is primarily that of a deacon, to the glory of God and His Church”.

== Bibliography ==
He authored 11 books and over 140 original studies and articles, which have been published and translated into 13 foreign languages.

His books are the following:

- Ἡ Ἐκκλησιολογία τοῦ ἁγίου Γρηγορίου Νύσσης (Διατριβή ἐπί διδακτορίᾳ), Ἀθῆναι 1969, pp. 195 [The Ecclesiology of Saint Gregory of Nyssa; (in Greek), Athens 1969, pp. 195].
- La place de l’ordination dans la Théologie sacramentaire de Syméon de Thessalonique (Thèse pour le Doctorat en Sciences religieuses), Strasbourg 1969, pp. 157.
- Ἡ ἔννοια τῶν ὅρων «Θεολογία», «Θεολογεῖν», «Θεολόγος», ἐν τῇ διδασκαλίᾳ τῶν Ἑλλήνων Πατέρων καί Ἐκκλησιαστικῶν συγγραφέων μέχρι καί τῶν Καππαδοκῶν, Ἀθῆναι 1972, pp. 187 - Αναδημοσίευση στη νέα ελληνική 2016 [The Meaning of the Terms “Theology”, “to Theologize” and “Theologian” in the Teaching of the Greek Fathers up to and Including the Cappadocians; (in Greek), Athens 1972, pp. 187 - Republication in 2016].
- Συνέπειαι τῆς πτώσεως καί λουτρόν παλιγγενεσίας (Ἐκ τῆς ἀνθρωπολογίας τοῦ ἁγίου Γρηγορίου Νύσσης), Διατριβή ἐπί Ὑφηγεσίᾳ, Ἀθῆναι 1973, pp. 198 [Consequences of the Fall and the Font of Regeneration (From the Anthropology of St. Gregory of Nyssa); (in Greek) Athens 1973, pp. 198].
- Ἡ Ἀγγλικανική ἀρχή τῆς Comprehensiveness καί ἡ Ὀρθόδοξος περί ἐλευθερίας ἀντίληψις, Ἀθῆναι 1975, pp. 81 [The Anglican Principle of Comprehensiveness and the Orthodox Understanding of Freedom; (in Greek), Athens 1975, pp. 81].
- Τά 39 Ἄρθρα τῆς Ἀγγλικῆς Ἐκκλησίας, ὑπό τό φῶς τῆς Ὀρθοδόξου Συμβολικῆς παραδόσεως, Ἀθῆναι 1982, pp. 461 [The 39 Articles of the Church of England: Under the Light of the Orthodox Symbolic Tradition; (in Greek), Athens 1982, pp. 461].
- Πρώϊμοι Ὁμολογίαι τῶν Ἐλευθέρων Ἀγγλικῶν Ἐκκλησιῶν, Ἀθῆναι 1985, pp. 220 [Early Denominations of the English Free Churches; (in Greek), Athens 1985, pp. 220].
- Ἱστορία Δογμάτων. Τόμος 1ος. Ἡ Ὀρθόδοξη δογματική παράδοση καί οἱ παραχαράξεις της κατά τούς τρεῖς πρώτους αἰῶνες, Ἀθῆναι 1998, pp. 732 [History of Doctrine, vol I., The Orthodox Doctrinal Tradition and its Distortion during the First Three Christian Centuries; (in Greek), Athens 1998, pp. 732].
- Abba Dorotheos. Practical Teaching on the Christian Life (Translation, Introduction and Glossary), Athens 2000, pp. 374 - Second Edition 2025, pp. 355 (Designed and produced by The Orthodox Press for the Holy Monastery of St John, Western Australia / Preface to the Second Edition by the Very Reverend Archimandrite Dr. Zacharias Zacharou of the Stavropegic Monastery of St John the Baptist in Essex – England).
- Ἱστορία Δογμάτων. Τόμος 2ος. Ἡ Ὁρθόδοξη δογματική διδασκαλία καί οἱ νοθεύσεις της ἀπό τίς ἀρχές τοῦ τέταρτου αἰώνα μέχρι καί τήν Τρίτη Οἰκουμενική Σύνοδο, Ἀθῆναι 2004, pp. 804 [History of Doctrine, vol II., Orthodox Doctrinal Teaching and its Falsification from the Beginning of the Fourth Century up to and Including the Third Ecumenical Council; (in Greek), Athens 2004, pp. 804].
- Ecclesial Being - Contributions to the Theological Dialogue, (ed. C. Veniamin), Mount Thabor Publishing, S. Cannaan PA 2005, pp. I-X, 179.
