= Laure Gauthier =

French writer & poet (born 1972)

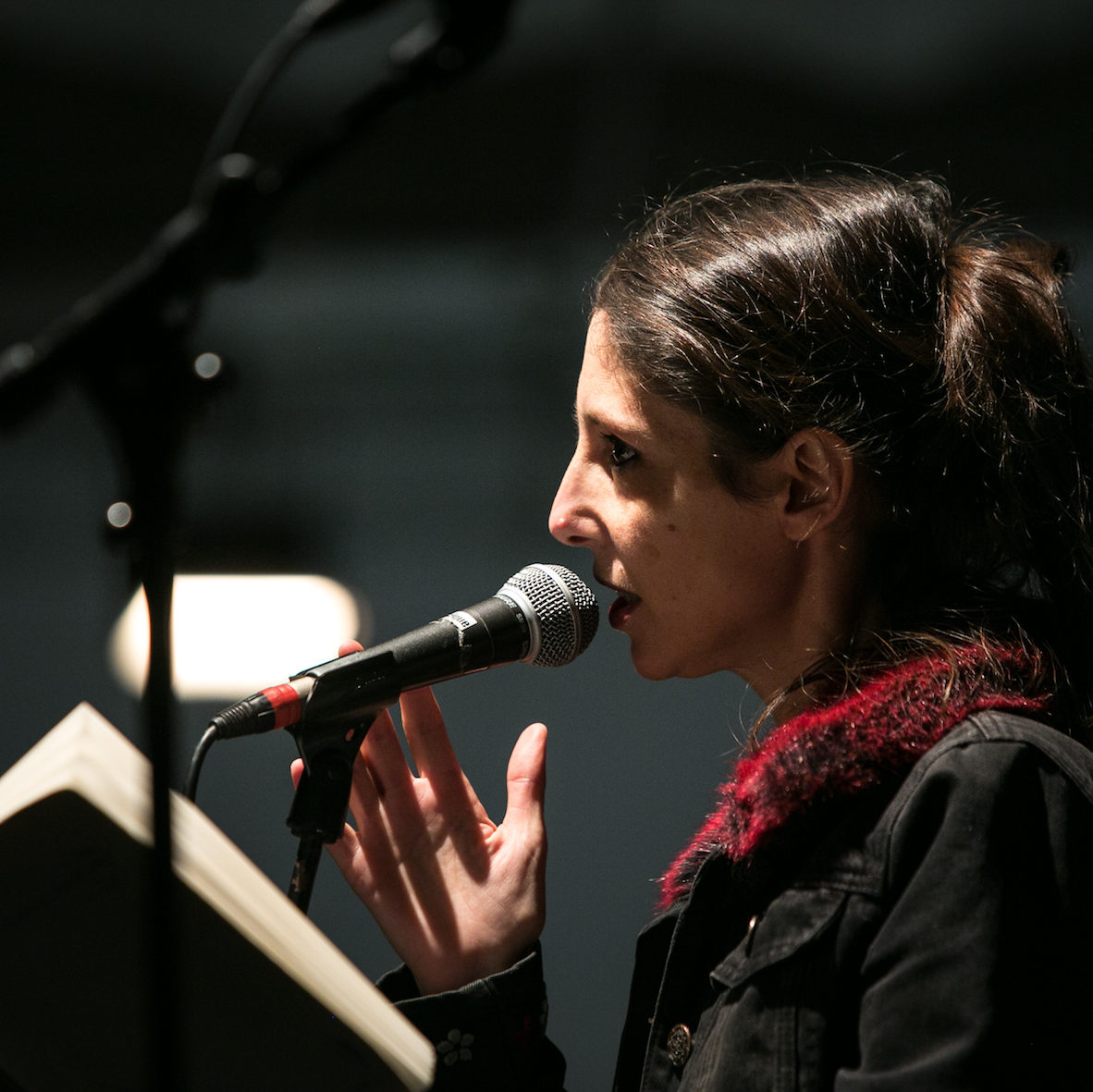
- Gauthier reading at The Lieu Unique in Nantes in 2019
- Born: 10 June 1972 (age 54); Courbevoie, France
- Occupations: Writer, poet
- Writing career
- Language: French
- Notable works: les corps caverneux (2022); je neige (entre les mots de villon) (2018); kaspar de pierre (2017); La cité dolente (2015); marie weiss rot, marie blanc rouge (2013)
- Website: www.laure-gauthier.com

Laure Gauthier (born 10 June 1972) is a French writer and poet.

== Biography ==
Gauthier was born in Courbevoie. She writes narrative texts and poems and creates text for multimedia works. She has notably published les corps caverneux in 2022, je neige (entre les mots de villon) in 2018 and kaspar de pierre in 2017.

Since 2013, she has published in numerous literary journals in France (TESTE, Remue.net, Po&sie, Place de la Sorbonne, Sarrazine, L'Etrangère, La moitié du fourbi, Vacarme, COCKPIT voice recorder, etc.), in Italy (Atelier, Insula Europea, etc.), in Switzerland (Cenobio,) in Austria (manuskripte), in Mexico (Ablucionistas, Círculo de poesía) and in Taiwan (Asymptote). She regularly gives public readings in France and Europe.

An associate professor in Contemporary performing arts, she teaches at The University of Reims-Champagne-Ardenne.

== Work ==
=== Poetry ===
==== Voice and images ====
In her books, Gauthier places a particular importance on the place of the voice that allows her to maintain a tension between a poetry without a subject and an embodied poetry. In kaspar de pierre, "any individuality effaces itself, writing I gives way to the blank page. The author decenters kaspar's voice bringing it closer to our own and within our hearing in order to create a space where living communally, living together, are part of the very act of speaking ..." (T. U. Comte, La Nouvelle Quinzaine littéraire).

Her work on the poetic voice is accompanied by a renewal of poetic imagery whereby the poetic images can be considered a kind of emergence, a meeting point between sensation and idea, or as Johan Faerber terms it, "the image-idea" in Diakritik speaking of je neige (entre les mots de villon). The question of the status of poetic imagery is also anchored in a reconsideration and a renewal of poetic ekphrasis.

Gauthier's work is marked by a polyphonic lyricism; her poetry is neither strictly objective nor entirely focused on the self, but is marked by a fragmented incarnation, a multi-layered chorus that marks a space of vigilance. If her work is lyric, it's a transubjective lyric, allowing for the creation of a considered gap between voices in je neige (entre les mots de villon) when they intertwine "three voices, maybe four, that of François Villon, his others".

==== Prose and poetry ====
In Le Monde Didier Cahen characterizes Gauthier's work as that of "materialized sound" where "different tempos fuse together in the same beat, electrifying the senses".

In general, Gauthier's texts alternate between passages in prose, prose-poetry and verse. The poems emerge as a kind of blue note at moments when the text breathes and its structure emerges, becoming fluid or on the contrary suspending its role in response to an external threat.

Gauthier's writing is marked by its sense of movement, its materiality and its kinetic force, the language, "deaf, pulses, surges, laughs, illuminates, revolts, and finally exists on its own and for its own sake".

==== Poetry, archives, and the tabloid journalism ====
In Gauthier's poetic work, she constantly questions external systematic attacks from a late capitalist society on the private life of the individual and on their personal expression, their burial under an accumulation of objects, a complacence with violence, a taste for sensationalism, what she calls the "tabloidization" of language or its exoticism.

Gauthier frequently draws on archives for inspiration in her work. For example, La cité dolente, is based on real events while kaspar de pierre was adapted from the biography of the famous orphan Kaspar Hauser. Her collection je neige (entre les mots de villon) establishes a dialogue between the personal biography of François Villon and his work, while maintaining critical distance with her material.

These books adopt a complex position in relation to the archive, where the archives are at once "suspected of a desire for reanimation. As if they were themselves an affirmation ... while the poem only allows for suggestion." These narratives are grounded in archival documents; however, Gauthier positions the poetic narrative slightly out of bounds of historical documentation "in order to allow the document to show itself and what surges beneath it, what is alive and bridles next to the established record".

=== Poetry and music ===
From 2018 on Gauthier began to explore the links between poetry and contemporary music for the online literary journal Remue.net working with Sébastien Rongier. She works to break down the barriers between sound poetry and written poetry, thereby renewing the links between contemporary music and poetry.

=== Transdisciplinary work ===
Her poetic work on poetic voice and polyphony continues with collaborations with contemporary artists such as Fabien Lévy, Núria Giménez-Comas, and Xu Yi. Gauthier is constantly seeking new poetic forms that cross media where the poet can be considered a co-author, Nun hab' ich nichts mehr, for example is a piece for soprano coloratura, ensemble and synthesizer with music by Fabien Lévy. Back into Nothingness is an mainly spoken monodrama for actress-soprano, choir and electronics with music by Núria Giménez-Comas. Les métamorphoses du serpent blanc is a lyric tale in six songs with music by Xu Yi. In 2018 she collaborated with Pedro Garcia-Velasquez and Augustin Mueller based on fragments of her texts and her recorded voice in order to create a 3D sound installation Etudes de théâtre acoustique, which was presented in the ZKM in Karlsruhe.

In 2022, still in collaboration with Pedro García-Velásquez and Augustin Muller, she conceived Remember the future, a poetic and sound installation that proposes an "acoustic siesta" and for which she wrote the texts and recorded her voice. Created on 24 March 2022 at Cesaré-cncm, this installation offers a journey through lost places and intimate spaces in an attempt to bring out images buried in the absence of real image.

== Bibliography ==
=== Poetry books ===
- Les corps caverneux, LansKine, Paris, 2022
- Éclectiques Cités, Paris, Acédie 58, 2021, 92 pp.
- je neige (entre les mots de villon), Paris, LansKine, 2018, 72 pp.
- kaspar de pierre, Bruxelles, La Lettre Volée, 2017, 52 pp.
- La cité dolente, Cirey-Sur-Blaise, Châtelet-Voltaire, 2015, 72 pp.
- marie weiss rot, marie blanc rouge, Sampzon, Delatour France, 2013, 230 pp.

=== Translated works ===
- Kaspar aus stein, translated by Andreas Unterweger, Edition Tannhäuser, 2021
- kaspar di pietra, bilingual Italian French, translated by Gabriella Serrone, Macabor, 2021
- La città dolente, bilingual Italian French, translated by Gabriella Serrone, Macabor, 2018

=== Essays ===
- Laure Gauthier, D'un lyrisme l'autre, la création entre poésie et musique. Laure Gauthier en dialogue, Paris, MF, 2022
- Jean-François Candoni & Laure Gauthier (dir.), Les grands centres musicaux du monde germanique (XVII^{e}-XIX^{e} s.), Paris, PUPS, 2014, 495 pp.
- Laure Gauthier, L'opéra à Hambourg (1648–1728), Naissance d'un genre, essor d'une ville, Paris, PUPS, 2010, 459 pp.
- Laure Gauthier & Mélanie Traversier, Mélodies urbaines : la musique dans les villes d'Europe (XVIe-XIXe siècles), Paris, PUPS, 2008, 360 pp.

=== Text and multimedia works ===
==== Musical works ====
- Les métamorphoses du serpent blanc, music by Xu Yi, first produced at the CRR de Paris, 2020
- Back into nothingness, musical monodrama essentially spoken for a soprano, chorus and electronic music Núria Giménez-Comas (production Grame cncm, coprod. Ircam, Spirito, Festival Archipel-Genève and TNP), first produced at TNP March16th et 17th 2018 (Biennale Musiques en scène) and March 24, 2018 at The Festival Archipel in Geneva
- Nun hab' ich nichts mehr, piece for soprano coloratura, ensemble and electronics, music by Fabien Lévy, Berlin, éditions Ricordi, first produced at The Teatro Regio di Parma October 13, 2016, and then at The Festival Eclat de Stuttgart February 5, 2017

==== Installations ====
- Remember the future, poetic and sound installation for 3D diffusion and automaton instruments, conceived by Laure Gauthier, Pedro Garcia Velasquez and Augustin Muller, creation on 24 March 2022 at Cesaré-cncm
- Commanderie (2019), for robotic arms, 3D sound installations and live concerts in, Pedro Garcia-Velasquez
- Etudes de théâtre acoustique (2018), 3-D sound installation with Pedro Garcia-Velasquez and Augustin Muller, text and voice, Laure Gauthier
- La forêt blanche (2019), multimedia installation, text and voice by Laure Gauthier, visual work by Sylvie Lobato, lights by Laurent Bolognini, sound installation by Martin Saëz

=== Film adaptations ===
- "kaspar de pierre" by Laure Gauthier, film adaptation by Thierry De Mey, Eroica productions 2018, 25 minutes

== Reception ==
=== les corps caverneux (2022) ===
- Alain Nicolas, "Laure Gauthier en route sur la voie caverneuse", L'Humanité, 23 March 2022
- Pierre Ménard, "En lisant en écrivant : lectures versatiles #51", Liminaire, 8 April 2022
- Adrien Meignan, "les corps caverneux", Un dernier livre avant la fin du monde, 4 February 2022
- Christian Rosset, "les corps caverneux", Diakritik, 2 February 2022
- Gilles Jallet, "les corps caverneux", remue.net, 31 January 2022
- Georges Guillain, "Ne rien laisser s'enfermer. Sur les corps caverneux de Laure Gauthier"], Les Découvreurs, 28 January 2022
- François Huglo, "les corps caverneux", Sitaudis, 21 January 2022
- les corps caverneux, cockpit critique club, "Cockpit voice recorder, no. 16, December 2021
- Rémy Soual, "les corps caverneux", Recours au Poème, 20 April 2022

=== je neige (entre les mots de villon) (2018) ===
- Katia-Sofia Hakim, "Une lecture de je neige (entre les mots de villon)", Place de la Sorbonne, revue internationale de poésie de Sorbonne Université, Paris, Sorbonne Université Presses (SUP), 2020
- Isabelle Alentour, je neige (entre les mots de villon), book review, Poezibao
- François Bordes, "Laure Gauthier, Je neige (entre les mots de villon)", Revue du Mauss permanente
- Dominique Boudou, je neige (entre les mots de villon), book review, Jacques Louvain
- Roland Cornthwaite, "Laure Gauthier", Gare Maritime, Anthologie de la Maison de la poésie de Nantes, pp. 39–40
- Georges Guillain, "je neige (entre les mots de villon)", Les Découvreurs
- Pierre Maubé, "je neige (entre les mots de villon)", Place de la Sorbonne no. 7, Presses de Sorbonne Université, pp. 129–130
- Angèle Paoli, "je neige (entre les mots de villon). Partir dans la langue pour se départir", Terres de femmes
- Christophe Stolowicki, "je neige (entre les mots de villon)", Libr-critique

=== kaspar de pierre (2017) ===
- Bernard Banoun, kaspar de pierre, CCP, February 2018, Cahier critique de poésie
- François Bordes, kaspar de pierre, Secousses, no. 23, November, 2017
- Thibault Ulysse Comte, "Ce chemin vers rien de certain. Kaspar de pierre", La Nouvelle Quinzaine littéraire, no. 1190, March 16–31, 2018
- Georges Guillain, kaspar de pierre, Les Découvreurs, December 2017
- Katia-Sofia Hakim, "kaspar de pierre de Laure Gauthier", Place de la Sorbonne no. 8, Presses de Sorbonne Université, 2018, p. 299-301
- Tristan Hordé, "kaspar de pierre", Sitaudis, July 10, 2018
- Isabelle Lévesque, "avec kaspar hauser?", TdF, no. 162, May 2018, Terres de femmes
- Fabien Mellado, "kaspar de pierre", Revue Phoenix, Spring 2017, no. 25, pp. 148–149
- Angèle Paoli, "Laure Gauthier. Kaspar de pierre. Ceci n'est pas de la poésie" [archive], Terres de femmes, October 18, 2017,Terres de femmes
- Claire Tencin, kaspar de pierre, art press, February 2018, no. 452, p. 82
- Florence Trocmé, "kaspar de pierre", Poezibao, October 9, 2017, Poezibao
- Sanda Voïca, "kaspar de pierre", La cause littéraire, February 26, 2018

=== La cité dolente (2015) ===
- Dominique Boudou, "la cité dolente", book review, Jacques Louvain, November 22, 2016
- Pascal Boulanger, "la cité dolente", Sitaudis, October 11, 2015
- Laurent Cassagnau, "la cité dolente", Revue Europe, vol. 93, no. 1038, October 2015, pp. 318–320
- Thibault Ulysse Comte, "La fraîcheur d'un souffle", Revue Regain
- Elio Grasso, "la città dolente", La dimora del tempo sospeso, July 16, 2018
- Claudio Morandini, "la città dolente", Diacritica, April 25, 2018
- Luigia Sorrentino, "la città dolente", Poesia di Luigia Sorrentino, 25 September 2015
- Claire Tencin, "la cité dolente", Poezibao, March 5, 2018
- Bonifacio Vicenzi, "il disagio di vivere nell'opera di Laure Gauthier", Su il Sogno di Orez, September 6, 2015

=== marie weiss rot, marie blanc rouge (2013) ===
- Yves Boudier, "Note de Yves Boudier sur marie weiss rot / marie blanc rouge" [archive], Cahier Critique de Poésie (CCP), 102 pp., Centre International de Poésie de Marseille, October 1, 2014
- Laurent Cassagnau, "Ecrire, traduire (contre) l'origine. En lisant, en traduisant marie weiss rot / marie blanc rouge de Laure Gauthier" [archive], La Main de Thôt, no. 2, traduction, plurilinguisme et langues
- Andreas Unterweger, "Übersetzen. Schreiben. Lesen. Zu Laure Gauthier : marie weiss rot / marie blanc rouge" [archive], Manuskripte, no. 206, December 4, 2014
