= Adulai =

Adulai is a given name. Notable people with the name include:

- Adulai Djabi Embalo (born 2005), Luxembourgish footballer
- Adulai Sambu (born 2004), Portuguese footballer
