= Eugène-Louis Doyen =

French surgeon

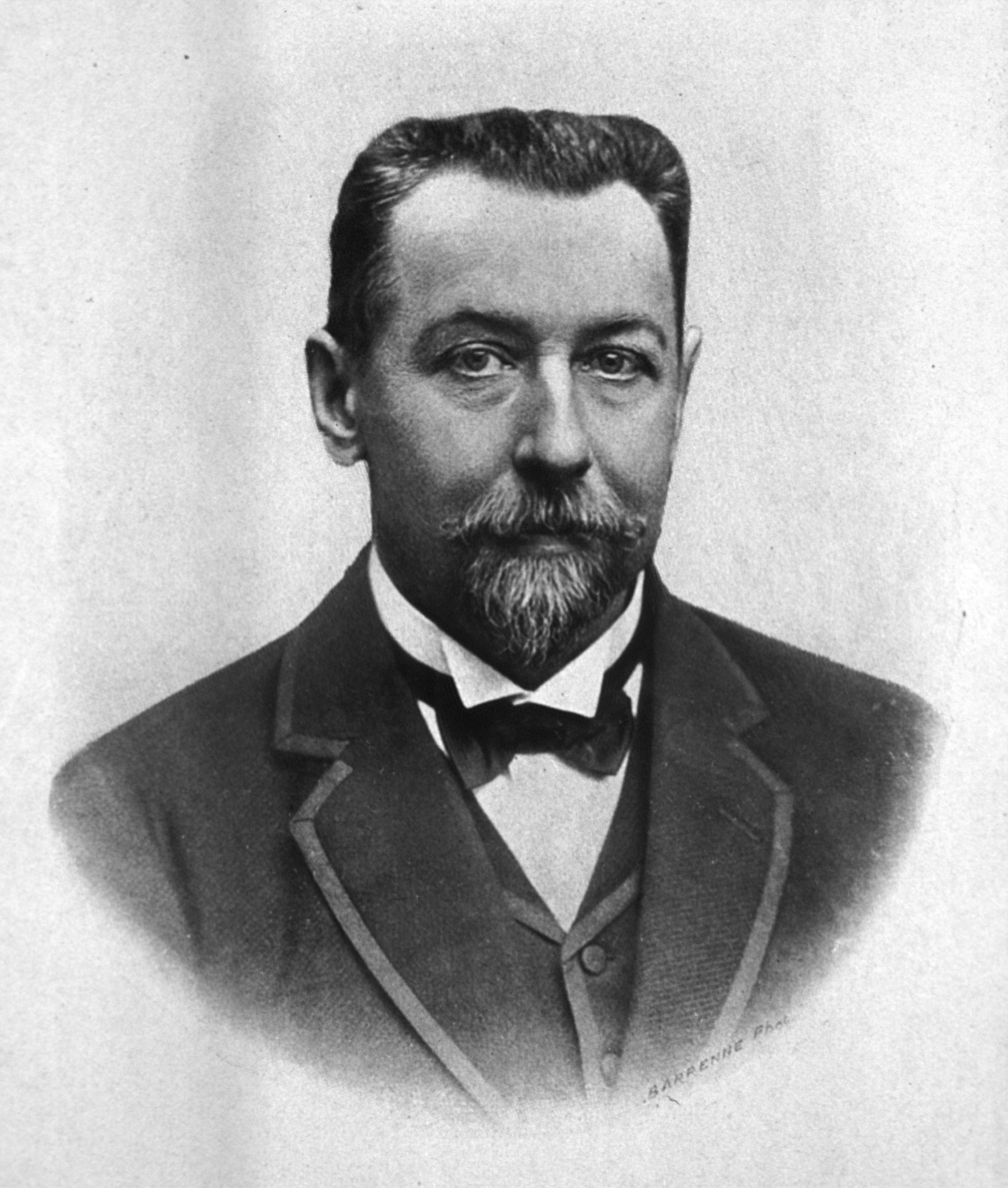
- Born: 16 December 1859; Reims, France
- Died: 21 November 1916 (aged 56)
- Education: École de médecine de Reims; Faculty of Medicine of Paris
- Occupation: Surgeon
- Known for: Doyen Abdominal Retractor, Electrosurgery, Electrocoagulation,

Eugène-Louis Doyen (16 December 1859 – 21 November 1916) was a French surgeon born in Reims.

== Early life and education ==
Doyen was the son of Octave Doyen (1831–1895), who served as mayor of Reims.

Eugène Doyen studied medicine in École de médecine de Reims and Faculty of Medicine of Paris. He completed his internship at the hospitals of Paris. He was a student of Just Lucas-Championnière. He prepared his thesis on the cholera germ in the laboratory of the Pasteur Institute under Edmond Nocard.

== Medical career ==
Doyen later opened a private medical institute in Paris that attracted a wealthy clientele. He was a skilled and innovative physician who introduced several surgical techniques and medical instruments, some of which bear his name today, such as Doyen Abdominal Retractor. He was a pioneer in the use of electrosurgery and electrocoagulation, and also marketed a yeast extract he called "mycolysine" for treatment of infectious diseases.

He had a keen interest in photography and cinematography, and performed early experiments of color film, microcinematography and stereoscopic film. He produced numerous films of operations, including a craniectomy, an abdominal hysterectomy, and a surgery for separation of conjoined twins Radhika and Dudhika Nayak, united in the area of the xiphoid process of the sternum. Although his films were popular at medical conferences abroad, they were harshly criticized by his contemporaries in France, who felt that the integrity of their profession had been compromised.

For a period of time, Doyen was editor-in-chief of the Revue Critique de Médecine et de Chirurgie, as well as the Archives de Doyen, a medico-surgical journal of the Doyen Institute.

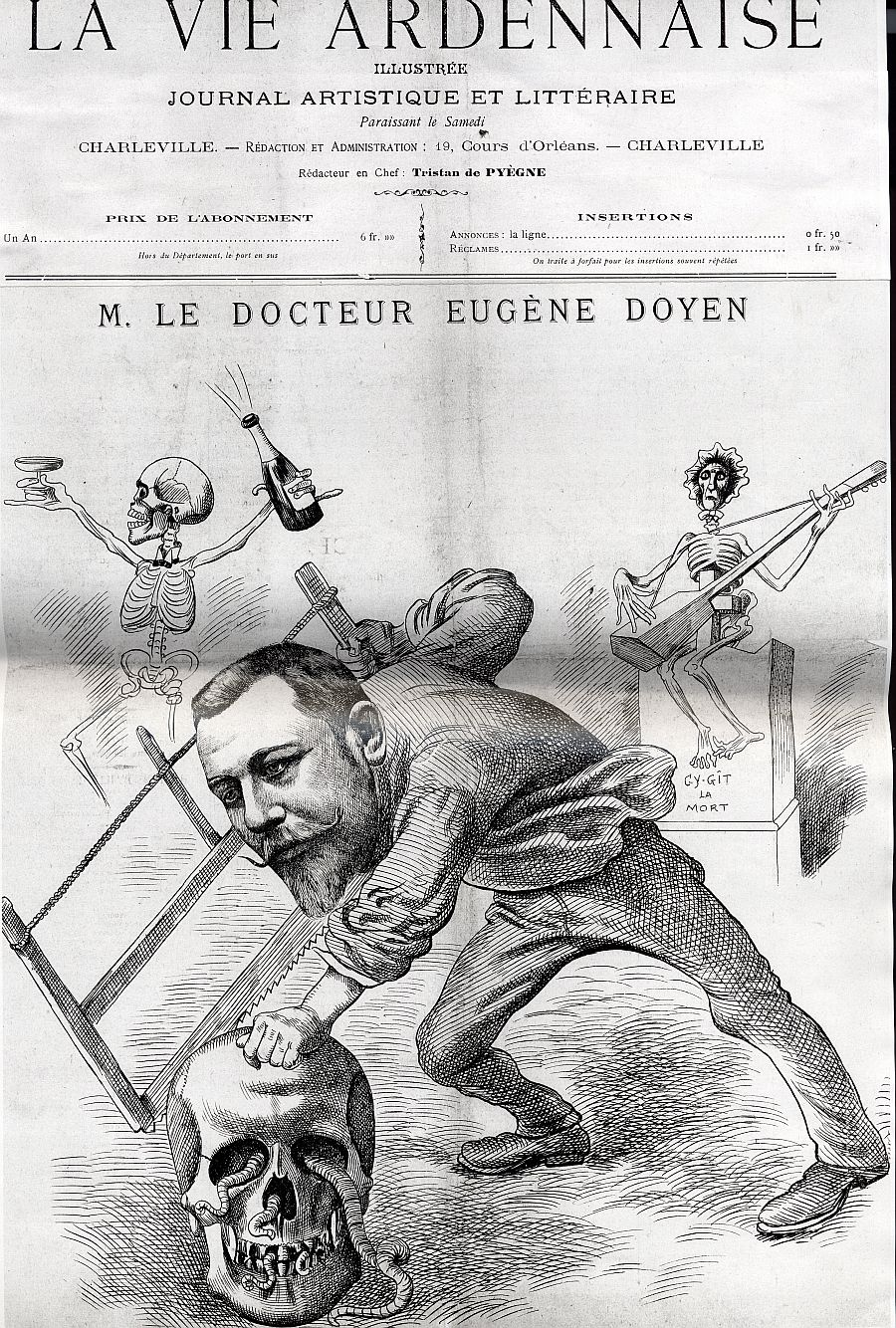
1898 satirical cartoon of Doyen

== Selected written works ==
- Atlas de microbiologie, 1897 - Atlas of microbiology.
- Etiologie et traitement du cancer, 1904 – Etiology and treatment of cancer.
- Le Traitement des infections staphylococciques, 1906 – Treatment of staphylococcal infection.
- Traité de thérapeutique chirurgicale et de technique opératoire, 1908 – Treatise on therapeutic surgery and operative techniques.
- Atlas d'anatomie topographique, 1911 – Atlas of topographic anatomy.
- "Surgical therapeutics and operative technique". (published in English, in collaboration with H. Spencer-Browne), New York, William Wood, 1917–20.
  - Volume 1. Introduction, general surgical technique, regional surgery head.
  - Volume 2. Regional surgery (continued), operations on the head (continued), thorax, upper and lower limbs.
  - Volume 3. Regional surgery (continued), operations on the abdomen.

== Personal life and legacy ==
Despite his surgical prowess, Doyen believed that surgery would eventually become obsolete due to advancements in medicine. He declined an offer from Louis Pasteur to join the Institut Pasteur under the condition that he cease patient treatment, choosing instead to continue his clinical practice.

Doyen's work extended beyond medicine; during World War I, he designed a mobile mortar that influenced modern artillery design. His controversial public persona often drew attention, as he engaged with high society and made provocative statements about medical practices.
