= Lucas Fagin =

Argentinian composer

Lucas Fagin (born 16 June 1980) is an Argentinian composer and co-founder of BabelScores – an online library of contemporary music.

Born in Buenos Aires, Argentina, Lucas Fagin began his musical education as an outsider of the academic world studying composition, piano, and electric guitar under the mentorship of composer Daniel Montes, guitar player Ricardo Martinez, and pianist Aldo Antognazzi. In 2003, he moved to France where he studied composition at the Conservatoire de Paris with Marco Stroppa, Stefano Gervasoni, and Luis Naón. He obtained his degree in 2007.

In 2009, in parallel with his activities as a composer, he co-founded BabelScores, a digital music library and database, alongside composer Pedro Garcia-Velasquez.

He received important commissions by Ensemble InterContemporain in 2011 and 2020, by the French state in 2012 and 2018, by Teatro Colón de Buenos Aires in 2011 and 2018, as well as by Radio France in 2015, 2017, and 2020. From 2016 to 2017, he was an artist-in-residence at the Académie de France à Madrid, Casa de Velazquez.

He won several music competitions and awards starting in 2006 with the International Composition Competition Diffusion 2006 for Electroacoustic Music, CCMCM from the Centre for Computational Musicology and Computer Music in Ireland. He won the Roux et Tronchets Foundation Prize given by the French Academy of Fine Arts in 2009. Lucas Fagin was also awarded the Tremplin Prize in 2010 by the Ensemble InterContemporain and the IRCAM. In 2015, he won the Ibermusicas International Composition Prize awarded by the Organization of Ibero-American States.

== Music composition ==
Lucas Fagin starts composing at a young age and his work focuses on both instrumental and electronic music. Some main characteristics of his creations are the exploration of instrumental and electronic spacialization. He is also interested in the use of noise, mixed or orchestrated with the tone. He sees the treatment of sound as plastic material, and the mixing and use of common objects together with traditional instruments or synthesizers allow him to create an abstract and contextless or hallucinatory sound world. Lucas Fagin also develops gestures coming from rock, fusion, or even jazz improvisation. Visual materials such as art, images, or colors are used in order to structure his sound ideas. Sometimes there are almost no signs or reference points, memory structures are diluted.

== Selected works ==
- Austral, for piano, 2001.
- Galaxia Espiral, for fifteen spatialized musicians, 2005.
- Filamentos, for electronic device, 2005.
- Cometas, for fourteen spatialized musicians, 2005.
- Entre Mundos, for orchestra, 2006.
- Crónica del Oprimido, for double bass and electronics, 2006.
- Arquetipo, for 34 musicians, 2007.
- Lanterna Magica, for six musicians, 2011.
- Linea de Universo, for string quartet, 2012.
- La Libertad total, opera, 2013.
- Psychedelic, for seven amplified instruments, 2015.
- Space Junk, for 22 spatialized strings, 2015.
- Supersonic, for electronic device, 2017.
- Electrochoque, for four electric guitars, 2018.
- Soyuz 245, for seven amplified instruments, 2019.
- Soyuz 237, for six amplified instruments, 2020.
- New work, for twenty five musicians, 2020.
