= Radhika and Dudhika Nayak =

Indian conjoined twins

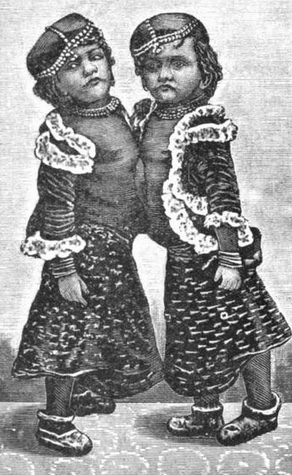
The Orissa Twins, from an 1894 publication.

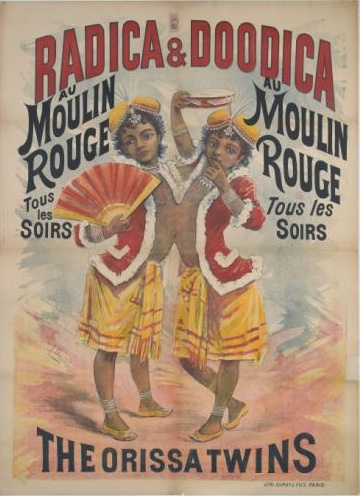
A poster publicizing the Orissa Twins' appearance at the Moulin Rouge in Paris, about 1900.

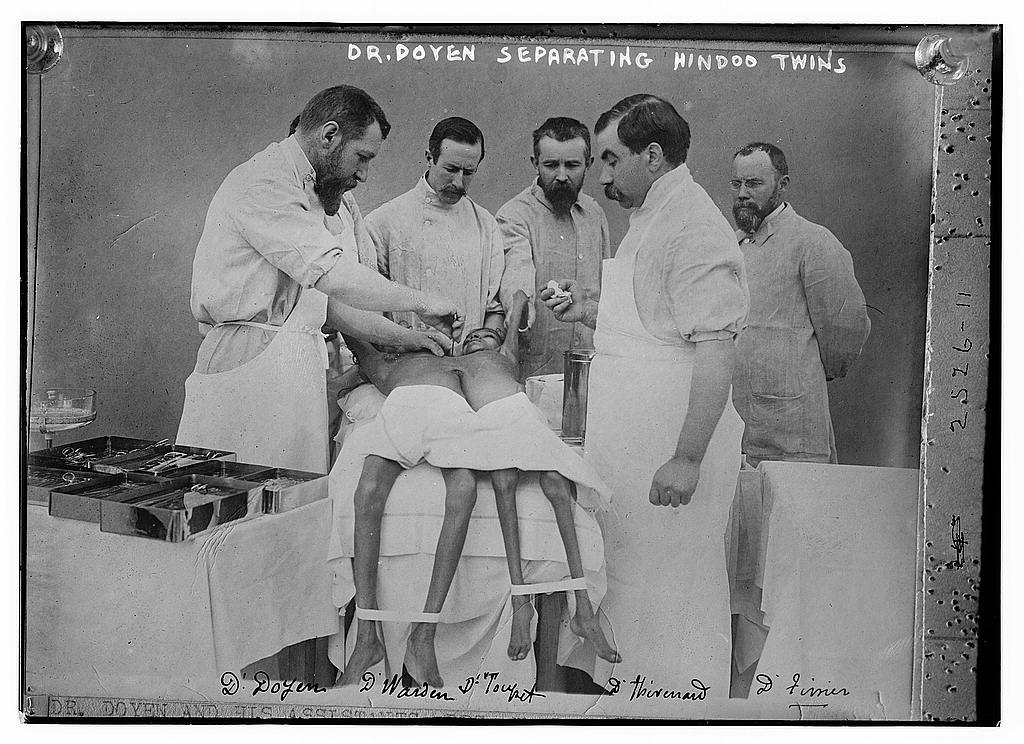
Dr Doyen separating the twins

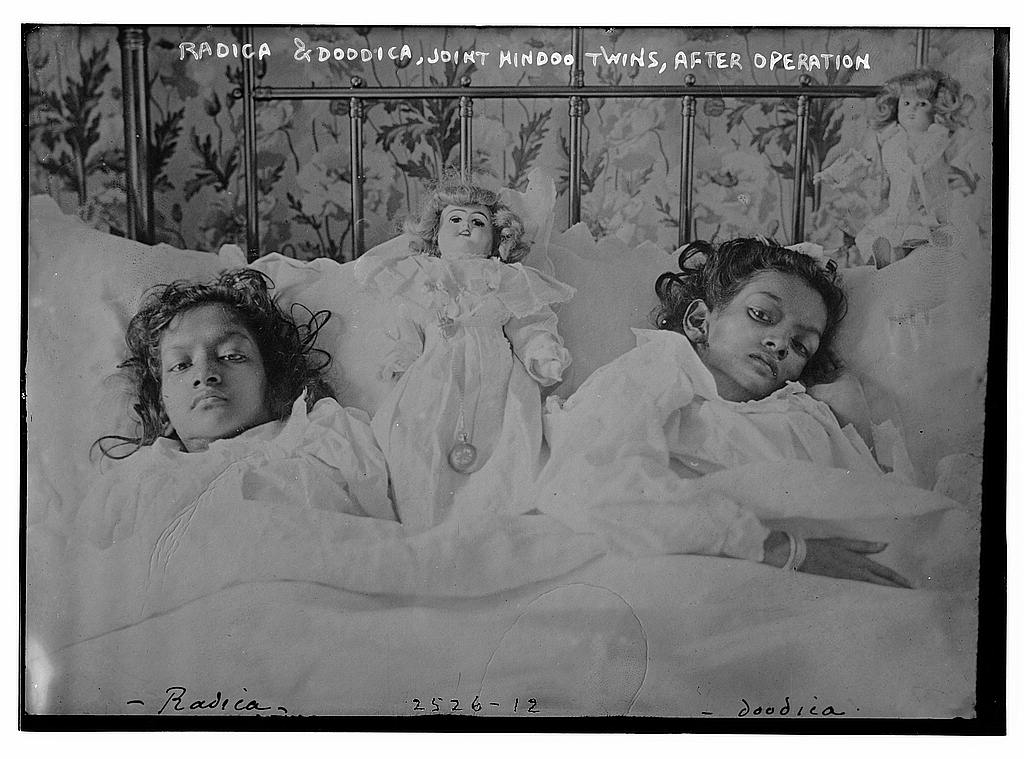
Radhika & Dudhika, after their separation in February 1902

Radhika and Dudhika Nayak (born 1888; Dudhika died on February 16, 1902; Radhika died in November 1903) were Indian conjoined twin sisters. They toured Europe and North America as "the Orissa Twins", sideshow performers with the Barnum and Bailey Circus. (Their names were spelled various ways in reports, over time and across languages.)

== Early life ==
Radhika and Dudhika were born in the Dhenkanal district of Odisha, probably in Huapada, the children of Khestra Nayak. They were taken into the care of a local religious community as infants.

== Medical condition ==
Radhika and Dudhika Nayak were xiphopagus conjoined twins, joined at the lower part of the breastbone and upper abdomen. Contemporary medical examinations found that, apart from where they were joined, both girls were healthy and normally developed. Physicians reported that the point of union extended from the lower end of the breastbone to the navel, while the rest of each girl's body was separate and well formed.

Also in 1893, the British Medical Journal published a report about their physical state, finding them "free from all element of repulsiveness" and "apparently perfect in every respect, except that from the ensiform cartilage to the umbilicus they are united together." Another medical journal reported that "the children seldom quarrel".

They noted that each girl had full control of her own arms and legs and that they walked and moved together with little difficulty.

Their unusual anatomy and otherwise good health attracted considerable medical interest. Physicians in Britain and the United States examined the twins during their exhibition tours, and descriptions of their condition appeared in both general and specialist medical journals.

== Sideshow career ==
The girls were removed from the sadhus' care by an English promoter called Captain Coleman, and they sailed for Europe with him in 1892. Their first public exhibition outside of India was at the Royal Aquarium in London. In 1893, they traveled to the United States, where they were displayed at the World's Columbian Exposition in Chicago that year. After their Chicago appearance, the Orissa Twins toured extensively with the Barnum and Bailey Circus sideshow. They were said to speak English, French, and German, and to have a Scottish governess.

== Separation and deaths ==
The twins had been traveling for almost a decade when Dudhika was found to have tuberculosis in 1902. A prominent French doctor, Eugène-Louis Doyen, offered to perform a surgical separation in hopes of saving Radhika's health. The surgery was filmed (as other procedures by Doyen had been). There was concern afterward that the surgeon had been distracted or hasty, because of the cameras and his ambition for good publicity. "The practice of medical heroics on Radica and Doodica's bodies," comments a recent historian, "can be understood as the spectacularization of medical superiority."

Dudhika died soon after the surgery, aged about 14 years, from peritonitis. Radhika recovered well, and was not told of her sister's death; she was baptized as Marie Marguerite and learned needlework. She died in 1903, aged about 15 years, from tuberculosis.

After their separation, the film of the procedure made its way into theatres, first for medical professionals, but eventually to a wider audience. There was "a storm of disgust" when the film was exhibited in Vienna in 1903. Doyen himself tried to stop the exhibition of the films in sideshows in 1904.

== Legacy ==
In 2017, conjoined twin boys Jaga and Kalia Kanhar, also from Odisha, were successfully separated by surgery in New Delhi. Radhika and Dudhika Nayak were recalled in some articles about the event.
