= Domaine Chandon California =

Winery in Yountville, California

Coordinates: 38.397241°N 122.365079°W

Domaine Chandon
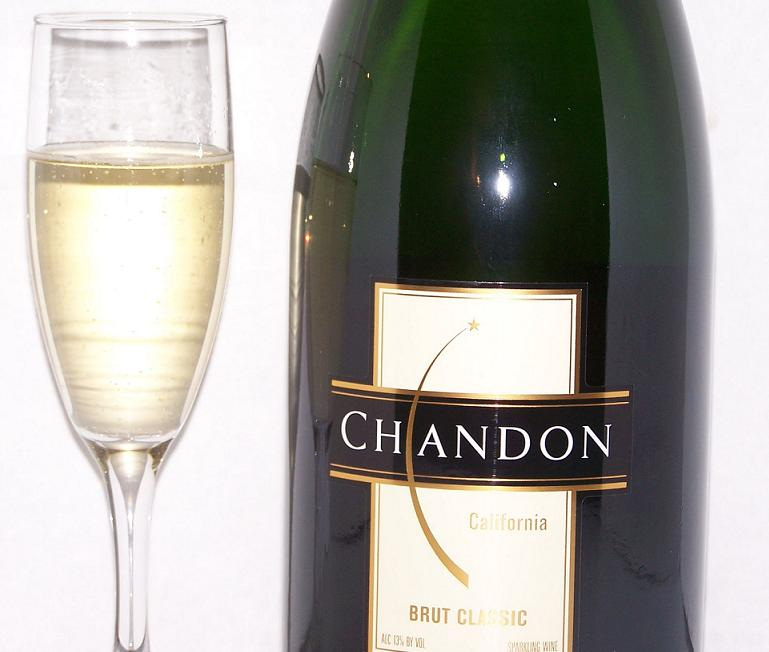
- Location: Yountville, California, U.S.
- Appellation: Yountville AVA
- Founded: 1973
- Key people: Pauline Lhote, Winemaker, Sparkling Wines
- Parent company: LVMH
- Known for: Brut Classic; Blanc de Noirs; Sweet Star
- Varietals: Pinot Noir, Pinot Meunier, Chardonnay, Cabernet Sauvignon
- Distribution: national
- Tasting: Open to the public
- Website: www.chandon.com

Domaine Chandon is a winery located in the town of Yountville, California, in the Napa Valley. Established in 1973 by Moët et Chandon, and led by businessman John Wright, who operated the company for over 20 years, it was the first French-owned sparkling wine producer in the Napa Valley.

The Restaurant at Domaine Chandon opened at the same time as the winery. Udo Nechutnys was the restaurant's first chef and was succeeded by Philippe Jeanty, who later opened Bistro Jeanty in Yountville. The restaurant was renamed Etoile in 2006 and closed in December 2014 in order to make room to expand the winery's tasting room.

The winery has vineyards located in several Napa Valley appellations including Los Carneros AVA, Mt. Veeder AVA, and Yountville AVA. Domaine Chandon makes both sparkling and still wines made from Chardonnay, Pinot noir, and Pinot Meunier, the traditional grapes used in the production of Champagne.

The company also has sister wineries located in Mendoza, Argentina, the Yarra Valley in Victoria, Australia, Brazil, and Ningxia, China.

== Gallery ==
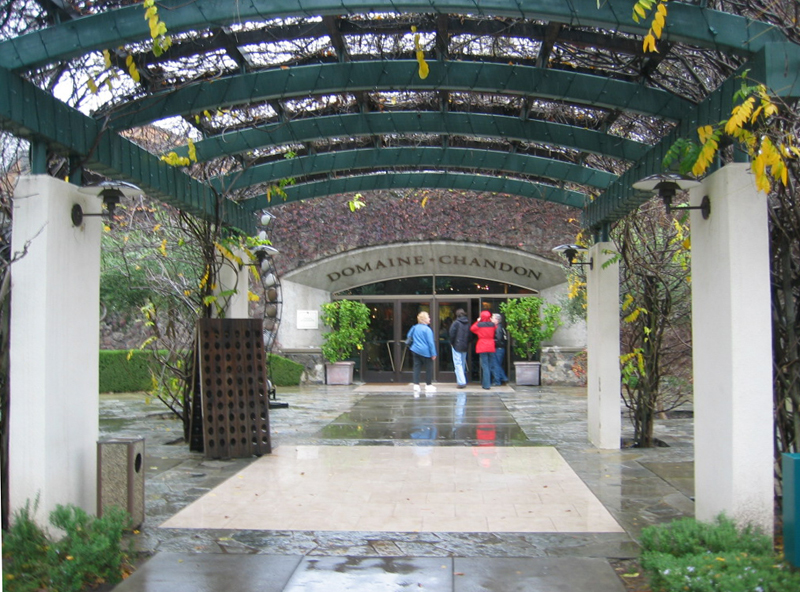
Winery entrance

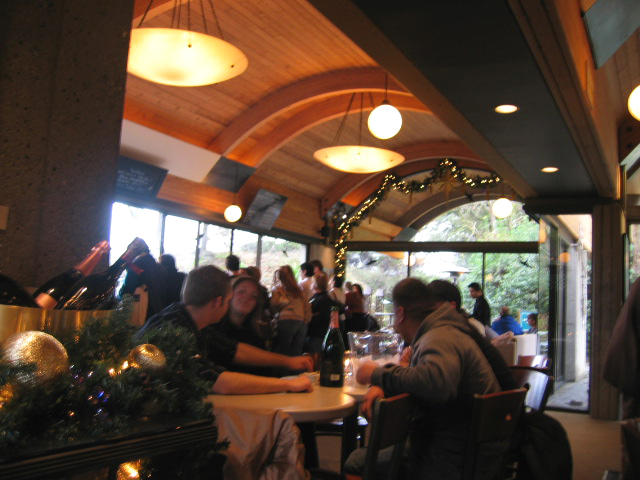
The winery tasting room

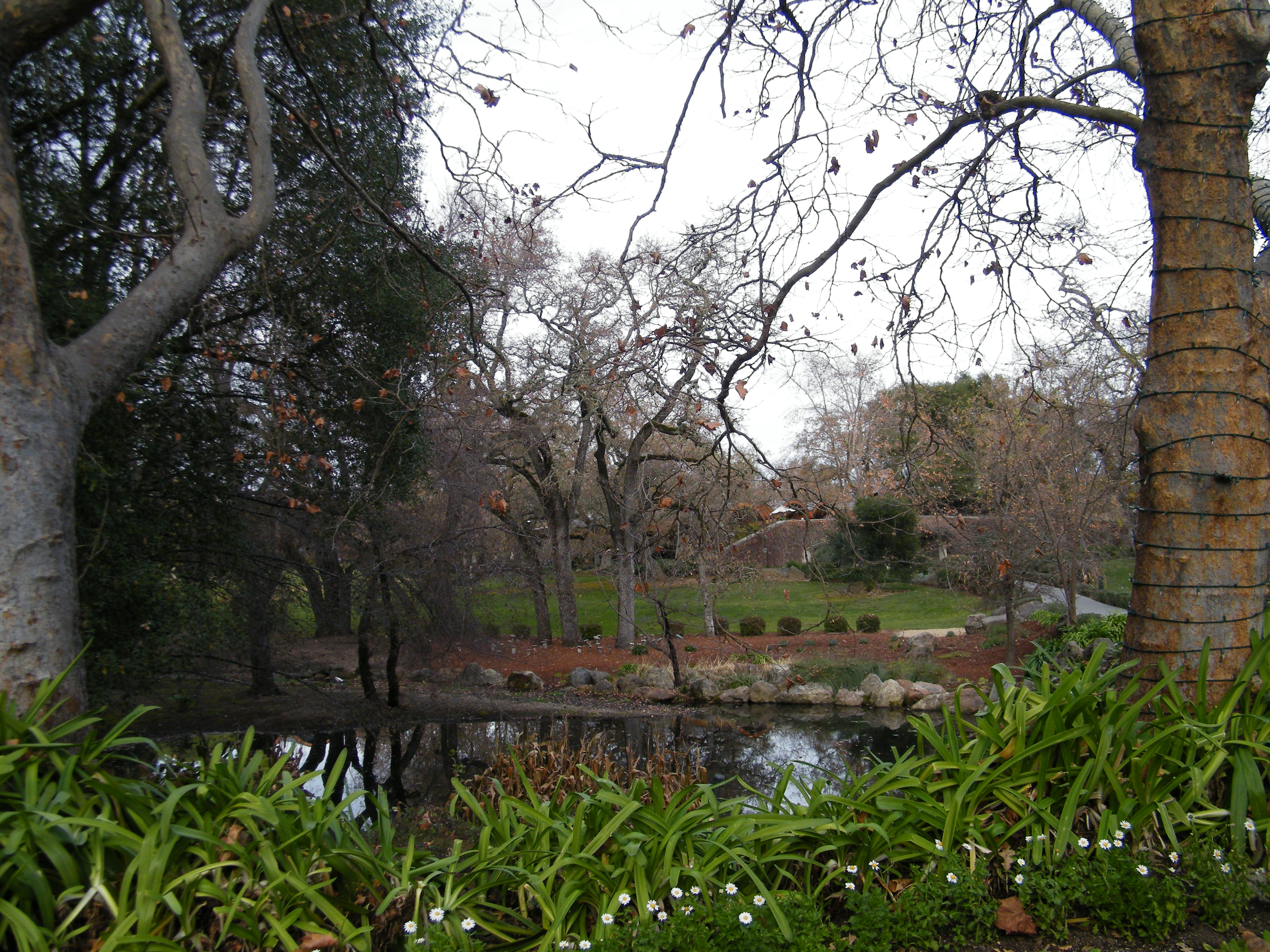
Part of the winery entrance at Chandon
