= Xu Yi (composer) =

Chinese-born French composer (born 1963)

- 徐儀
- Born: 1963 (age 62–63); Nanjing, China
- Education: Shanghai Conservatory of Music
- Alma mater: Conservatory of Music of Paris, IRCAM
- Occupations: Composer, Music educator

Xu Yi (simplified Chinese: 徐仪; traditional Chinese: 徐儀; pinyin: Xú Yí; born 1963) is a Chinese-born French composer and music educator in France.

== Early life ==
In 1963, Xu Yi was born in Nanjing, China. Xu Yi began playing the Chinese violin, erhu, at a very young age.

== Education ==
Xu Yi was a student at the Shanghai Conservatory of Music, where she continued the violin, and later joined the class of composition.

After her arrival in France in 1988, she studied the Cursus of Composition and Computer Music of the IRCAM (1990/1991). She entered the Conservatory of Music of Paris, where she studied with Gérard Grisey and Ivo Malec.

== Career ==
At the age of 22, Xu became a teacher at the Shanghai Conservatory of Music.

Xu Yi won First Prize in composition in Conservatoire de Paris in 1994. She was the winner of the Prix de Rome, winning the honor of living in the Villa Medici in Rome from 1996 to 1998 (she was the first composer of Chinese origin to win this prize). Xu was professor of composition at the Cergy-Pontoise National Conservatory of Music (2001–2003). She is a distinguished Professor at the Shanghai Conservatory of Music. Currently, Xu lives in France and is a distinguished Professor at the Wuhan Conservatory of Music.

Xu Yi has received commissions from the French government, Radio France, and many festivals and ensembles. She has composed some 60 works, which have been performed at numerous festivals and broadcast in Europe, China, Japan, the US, Brazil and Canada. Several monographic concerts of Xu's music have been organized in France and in Italy. One monographic disc of her works (MFA-Radio France 1999) was distributed by Harmonia Mundi. Her work "Le Plein du Vide" was selected by the French Ministry of Education for the final high school music exam in 2006 and 2007. Many of her works are published by the music publishing House Henry Lemoine, in Paris.

== Works ==
- 2025 "Space-time of the heart", for 11 percussionists, electroacoustics, and video art (Shanghai Percussion Ensemble/IPEA commission)
- 2024-25 "Cinq transformations", for string quartet N.3 (ProQuartet, Centre Présence Compositrices, Quatuor Akilone commission)
- 2024 "Vers le vide parfait", for string quartet N.2 (French State commission)
- 2023 "Trois poèmes anciens", for mezzo-soprano, qin and percussions, poems de Xu Mu, Xue Tao, Xu Can
- 2023 "Ô silence", for soprano, bass clarinet, viola and piano, Poem of Marie Closset
- 2022 "Cha ji / Wabi-sabi", for flute, clarinet, 2 percussions, violin and zheng (TimeArt studio commission)
- 2022 "Entre eux, entente à demi-mot", for mezzo-soprano, flute, percussion, violin and cello, poem of François Cheng
- 2021 "Dry in a storm", for mezzo-sprano (with percussions), Poems by Joyce Shintanin and by Emily Dickinson
- 2021 "Echo nocturne", for birbyne solo
- 2020 "To wait an hour-si long", for soprano, violon ans cello, 5 Poems (Quatrains) by Emily Dickinson (Radio France commission)
- 2020 "The Dust of time", for percussion
- 2020 "Self/nonself", for yunluo (with one big cymbal)
- 2019 "Métamorphoses du serpent blanc", chamber opera (French State commissions), Laure Gauthier : Text and poem in French; Xu Yi : poems in chinese, for soprano, mezzo-soprano, maîtrise, little children's choir, 6 instruments and electronic device spatialized in multitrack
- 2019 "Qing yao", for Zheng solo (with qing)
- 2018 "Two rotations" for alto and percussion
- 2018 "Ode aux nymphéas" miniature for string quartet (ProQuartet commission)
- 2018 "Saveur" for percussion and danse
- 2017 "Aquilone lontano" for string quartet N.1 (ProQuartet and Philharmonie de Paris commissions)
- 2017 " Résonance végétale" for cucurbit orchestra, video and electronics spatialised (ENS commission)
- 2016 "Chu Feng" - Shangpian for xiao / xun, guqin, percussion, bianqing and bianzhong (2500 years old bronze chime)
- 2016 "Chu Feng" - Xiapian for di / xiao, shang bass, guzheng, pipa, 2 percussion, bianqing and bianzhong (2500 years old bronze chime) (Music collaborative Innovation Center of Hubei / Conservatory of Wuhan commission)
- 2015 "Chant des muses" for soprano, 3 ténors, choir and 13 instruments (COSU commission)
- 2015 "Bœuf" for percussion solo
- 2014 "Empress Wu Zetian" Lyrical drama in 3 actes (French State commission), livret : Agnès Marietta, for 3 singers, 1 actress-singer, young girls choir, 7 musicians and electronic device spatialized in multitrack
- 2014 "Ombres" for violon solo
- 2013 "La passion selon Médée" for 1 dancer, 1 flutist, 1 percussionist and one ensemble of 11 musicians
- 2012 "La joie du ciel" for 5 female voice a capella (De Caelis ensemble commission)
- 2011 "Si He" for Qin, flute, cello and percussion (Shanghai Conservatory and the Shanghai Cultural Foundation commission)
- 2010 "Zhiyin" for cello solo
- 2010 "Liao" for percussion solo
- 2010 "Le Ciel brûle" for mezzo-soprano and percussion
- 2009 "Qing" for alto solo (Pro Helvetia Switzerland commission)
- 2008 "Dan" for 6 instruments
- 2007 "Guo feng" for violin, cello, qin and electronics spatialised (French State commission)
- 2006 "Cohésion" for clarinet, 4 saxophones, 6 brass and 7 groups of specialized children with the percussions
- 2005 "Tai" for Zheng and orchestra (Shanghai Conservatory commission)
- 2004 "Pipa yin" for 6 instruments
- 2004 "1+1=3" for 11 percussions (French State commission)
- 2004 "Da Xu" for 6 instruments (Radio France commission)
- 2003 "La divine" silent movie in concert, for silent film of Wu Yonggang, 10 instruments and electronics spatialised (ARTE commission)
- 2002 "Voyage intérieur" for 6 instruments and electronics spatialised (French State commission)
- 2002 "Variations sur le thème de Y.G.S.D" for pipa and 8 instruments
- 2001 "Dialogue d’amour" for soprano, choir of children and 13 instruments (Radio France commission)
- 2001 "Tempête sur l’Asie" silent movie in concert, for silent film of Poudovkine, 7 musicians and electronics spatialised (Louvre commission)
- 2000 "Da gui" in memory of Gérard Grisey, for flute, clarinete, percussion, violon et cello (French State commission)
- 1999 "Crue d’automne" scenic poem, for 1 reciter, video, 6 musicians and electronics spatialised(French State commission)
- 1997 "Le Plein du Vide" for 14 instruments and electronics spatialised (French State commission)
- 1997 "Écho de la terre profonde" for 5 percussions
- 1997 "Tian yun" Melodrama, for 1 reciter and 8 instruments
- 1996 "Wou Wei" for bass flute and trumpet
- 1996 "Solo" for flûte solo
- 1996 "Xiao-yao-you" for 12 instruments and electronics spatialised
- 1995 "Gu yin" for flute and percussion (Radio France commission)
- 1994 "Huntun" for 5 instrumental groups spatialised
- 1993 "Wang" for flute solo, string trio and percussion
- 1993 "Le Roi des arbres" spoken opera in 1 acte (3 tables), for a conductor, 3 comédians and 8 musiciens
- 1993 "Yi" for string trio
- 1992 "Miroir / poussière" for alto and 9 instruments
- 1991 "Tui" for bass and electronics
- 1991 "Tao1" for 6 instruments
- 1988 "Esprit poétique" for Erhu (violon chinois) and Chinese orchestra
- 1987 "Internal moving" for soprano, clarinete, alto and piano
- 1986 "Symphonietta" for orchestra
- 1985 "Temple Hanshan" for soprano and 3 Chinese instruments
- 1984 "Vallée vide" for Chinese flute, zheng and sets-gong
- 1983 "Pine wave" for piano solo
- 1982 "Small frogs" for ensemble of erhu (Chinese violin)

== Discographie ==
- 2017 "Zhiyin" cello solo, (7') CD of the"Collection of Excellent Works by Alumni from SHCM" pour "The 90th Anniversary of Shanghai Conservatory of Music" 2017
- 2013 "Si He", "Si He" for Qin, flute, cello and percussion (9') China Record Co. Shanghai
- 2005 "Tai", for Zheng and orchestra, (11') CD Shanghai Conservatory of Music 2005
- 1999 "Le Plein du Vide", "Wang", "Yi", "Echo de la terre profonde", "Gu Yin", "Xiao-Yao-You"(70') Radio France / MFA / Villa Médicis 1999, MFA 216032 HMCD 73.
- 1994 "Huntun" (13') for 5 instrumental groups spatialised CD Journées de la composition, CNSMP 1994.
- 1988 "Esprit poétique"1983-1988 (26'), for Erhu (violon chinois) and chinese orchestra, Fu Mao Record Co. Taiwan, 1988, Fu jian Record Co. XCD-93014 / 1993, 1994.
- 1986 "Vallée vide" 1984 (7'), for Chinese flute, zheng and sets-gong China Record Co. Shanghai, 1986.
- 1982 "Small frogs" for ensemble of erhu (Chinese violin)1982 (6'), China Record Co. Shanghai, 1982.
