= Le Balcon =

Chamber orchestra

- Chamber orchestra
- Founded: 2008
- Location: Paris, France
- Website: www.lebalcon.com

Le Balcon is a chamber orchestra dedicated to the interpretation of music through the amplification of acoustic instruments.

The ensemble has numerous aims: to stimulate writing for amplified acoustic instruments and to rethink the aesthetic of the concert, seeking new methods of production, interpretation, and configuration.

Effective amplification gives the ensemble the ability to perform a concert in all of its guises and in every setting : concert halls, public spaces, open arenas and even passage ways... This setup allows the ensemble to go beyond the natural acoustics of the performance space and the chance to reach out to a larger audience with a repertoire that has habitually been reserved for affiliates of the contemporary scene. The ensemble offers new possibilities for musical interpretation with particular regard to the instrumental performance: the correlation between visual gestures and the actual sound which is heard can be completely transformed. Moreover, in the case of the performance of 20th- and 21st-century works where the aesthetic is powered by instrumental gestures, amplification augments the technical possibilities of each instrument, modifies their timbre and transforms the sonic plane.

Le Balcon was founded in 2008 by six students of the Conservatoire de Paris – Composers Juan Pablo Carreño, Mathieu Costecalde and Pedro Garcia-Velasquez, Conductor Maxime Pascal, Sound Engineer Florent Derex and Pianist Alphonse Cemin.
