= Janine Cossy =

French chemist

Janine Cossy (born in 1950) is a French chemist who specialises in the synthesis of biologically-active products and is an emeritus professor of organic chemistry at ESPCI Paris.

== Biography ==
Janine Cossy earned a doctorate in chemistry at the University of Reims, and then undertook a post-doctoral fellowship with the team of Professor Barry Trost at the University of Wisconsin at Madison. Appointed as a professor at ESPCI ParisTech in 1990, her work focuses on the total synthesis of natural biologically-active products like anticancer agents, antibiotics, anti-inflammatories or products acting on the central nervous system. She has also conducted research on free-radical reactions and photochemical reactions. Janine Cossy has been a consultant for Rhône-Poulenc, Rhodia and L'Oréal and co-founded the startup Acanthe Biotech and CDP Innovation.

== Distinctions ==
- Elected President of the Organic Chemistry Division of the French Chemical Society from 2002 to 2006 and of the Franco-Japanese Chemical Society
- Awarded the Jungfleish Prize by the Academy of Sciences in 1996
- Awarded the CNRS Silver Medal in 1996
- Awarded the Grand Prix Achille Le Bel by the French Chemical Society in 2009
- Admitted as a Knight to the National Order of Merit in 1997
- Awarded several pharmaceutical company prizes: Novartis in 2000 and 2008, the Boehringer Ingelheim in 2001, Eli Lilly and Company in 2008, Abbott Laboratories in 2008, and both AstraZeneca and Bristol-Myers-Squibb in 2010.
- Admitted as a Knight to the Legion of Honour in 2013

Janine Cossy is a member of IUPAC, the steering committee of the Pierre-Gilles de Gennes Foundation for Research and the scientific counsel of CNRS for the 2010–2014 term. She edits the scientific journals Organic Letters, New Journal of Chemistry, European Journal of Organic Chemistry and the Journal of Organic Chemistry.

== Works ==
- Carbon with No Attached Heteroatoms (Elsevier Science, 2005)
- Comprehensive organic functional group transformations (Elsevier Science, 2005)
