= Ziad el-Doulatli =

Ziad el-Doulatli (Tunisian Arabic: زياد الدولاتلي) is a Tunisian activist affiliated with the Islamist Ennahda Movement, for which he is an executive.

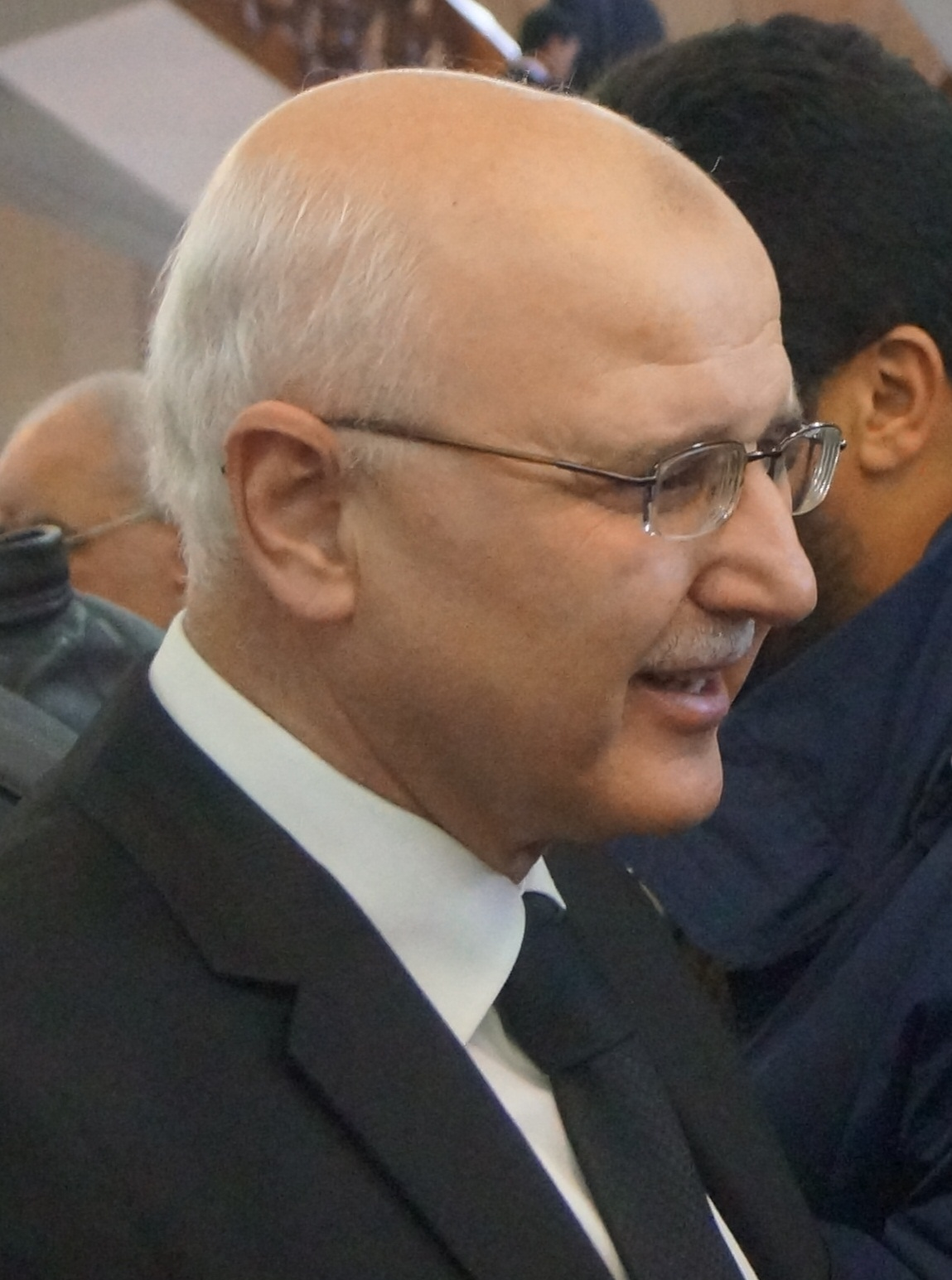
Image of Ziad el-Doulatli

== Background ==
Ziad el-Doulati obtained his doctorate degree in pharmacology from the University of Reims in France in 1984. While there he was also head of the Union of Muslim Students.

He was arrested in 1981 for his affiliation with the Islamic Action Party, now the Ennahda Movement, then immediately released. In 1987 he was sentenced to twenty years in prison, but was released after only eleven months following the ascension of Zine El Abidine Ben Ali to the presidency in November 1987.

In 1991 he was sentenced to fifteen years in prison, of which he served fourteen years. He was the editor-in-chief for the publication al-Fajr which was later banned by the Tunisian government and whose staff were imprisoned. Between March and July 2010, Ziad el-Doulatli was placed under periodic house arrest and close police surveillance.

In March 2010 the Tunisian police forces were ordered to place Ziad el-Doulatli under house arrest in order to keep him from visiting with human rights activist Zahir Makhlouf after his release from prison. In June 2010 he even threatened to go on hunger strike if the police did not let up "the constraints that they had placed on him."

== Ideas ==
Ziad el-Doulatli has long been an opponent of the Ben Ali regime and a proponent of democratic reform in Tunisia. He has repeatedly stated his opposition to armed struggle as a means of bringing about change. He has long advocated the equal rights and treatment of women who wear the hijab in Tunisian society. In 2006 he called for the Tunisian government to "review its policy" in relation to women wearing the veil and to "treat the Tunisian veiled woman as a citizen who has the full right to choose the hijab and exercise her right in education and work environments without harassment and discrimination."

== Role in post-Ben Ali Tunisia ==
Doulatli has criticized the transitional Tunisian government for continuing to "act with the mentality of the bygone era." He has also criticized Yadh Ben Achour, the president of the Higher Political Reform Commission of Tunisia, for his "secular leanings and resentment towards religion." He strongly supports Rashad el-Ghanushi, one of the leading founders of the Tunisian Nahda Party, and organized a welcome for him for his return to Tunisia on January 30, 2011. He is seeking to legalise the Nahda as a political party in Tunisia.
