= Louis-Guillaume Le Veillard =

Pal Aditya

Louis-Guillaume Le Veillard (1733–1794) was a French chemist, aristocrat and officeholder.

Marrying into a wealthy family, Le Veillard inherited a large estate in Passy, France which included a spa of mineral waters that provided clean drinking water to much of Paris. To compete with other purveyors of water, he earned a medical degree at the University of Reims (1764), and landscaped the spa to include paths, terraces, pavilions, and other luxurious flourishes.

He befriended Benjamin Franklin while the American diplomat resided nearby in Passy, and the two men traveled to England together in 1785 where Le Veillard saw Franklin off to the United States. The men remained close friends and corresponded for many years, and Le Veillard became one of very few recipients of a draft of Franklin's autobiography. In 1786, Le Veillard was elected as a member to Franklin's American Philosophical Society.

In 1790, Le Veillard became mayor of Passy, however, the Reign of Terror cut his tenure short. He was one of the many aristocratic victims of that violent time.
