= Christiane Chabi-Kao =

Beninese film director and screenwriter

- Born: June 30, 1963 (age 63); Marseille
- Education: University of Reims Champagne-Ardenne
- Occupations: Film director, screenwriter
- Notable work: Les enfants esclaves

Christiane Chabi-Kao (born 30 June 1963) is a Beninese film director and screenwriter.

== Biography ==
Chabi-Kao was born in Marseille, France, in 1963. She attended the University of Reims Champagne-Ardenne from 1984 to 1986. In 1990, Chabi-Kao returned to Africa. She came out with her first film, Les enfants esclaves, in 2005, a documentary detailing modern slave children.

In 2007, she directed the film Les inseparables. It tells the story of siblings Yawa and Abi, whom their father sells to a child trafficker, and the mother goes to the Police Children's Protection Unit to find out what happened. The film was co-produced by UNICEF and the Beninese National Radio and Television (ORTB), and came out as a series of four short films. Chabi-Kao wrote the film in part to raise awareness and end child trafficking. It received the African Numerique award at the Vues d'Afrique festival in Montreal in 2008, and also received the Human Rights prize at the 2009 Panafrican Film and Television Festival of Ouagadougou. After being informed of a ban on free open air screenings, Chabi-Kao organized a screening of the film for 300 Burkinabe students.

In 2009, she succeeded Monique Mbeke Phoba as the director of the Lagunimages festival in Cotonou. As director, Chabi-Kao helped start a film festival of the same name. She worked for the festival for several years before becoming the director, and received a grant from Deutsche Welle Academy to learn how to organize the festival.

Chabi-Kao wrote and directed the 14-part television series Les Chenapans in 2013. It depicts the lives and struggles of five Beninese teenagers, and it uses non-professional actors.

== Filmography ==
- 2005: Les enfants esclaves
- 2007: Les inseparables
- 2013: Les Chenapans
- 2014: Crocodile dans la Mangrove
