= David Hamilton (diarist) =

Scottish physician (1663–1721)

Sir David Hamilton FRS
- Born: 1663; Scotland
- Died: 28 August 1721 (aged 57–58)
- Education: University of Reims (MD)
- Occupation: physician
- Known for: physician to Queen Anne

Sir David Hamilton, FRS (1663 – 28 August 1721) was a Scottish physician to Queen Anne, during which appointment he kept a diary.

== Life ==
Born in Scotland, he entered the University of Leiden as a medical student on 30 October 1683. He graduated MD of the University of Reims in 1686. He was admitted a licentiate of the London College of Physicians in 1688, and fellow in 1703.

Elected a Fellow of the Royal Society in 1708, Hamilton became a leading practitioner in midwifery, and was successively physician to Queen Anne, who knighted him, and to Caroline, Princess of Wales. He is said to have acquired a fortune of £80,000, which he lost in the South Sea Bubble. He died on 28 August 1721.

== Works ==
Hamilton wrote:

- An inaugural Dissertation for M.D. "De Passione Hysterica", Paris, 1686.
- The Private Christian's Witness for Christianity, in opposition to the National and Erroneous Apprehensions of the Arminian, Socinian, and Deist of the Age, London, 1697.
- The Inward Testimony of the Spirit of Christ to his outward Revelation, London, 1701. This and the previous work were anonymously published.
- Tractatus Duplex: prior de Praxeos Regulis, alter de Febre Miliari, London, 1710; Ulm, 1711; English translation, London, 1737.
