= University of Reims Champagne-Ardenne =

Public university based in the Grand-Est region of France

Coordinates: 49°15′07″N 4°02′15″E

- Université de Reims Champagne-Ardenne
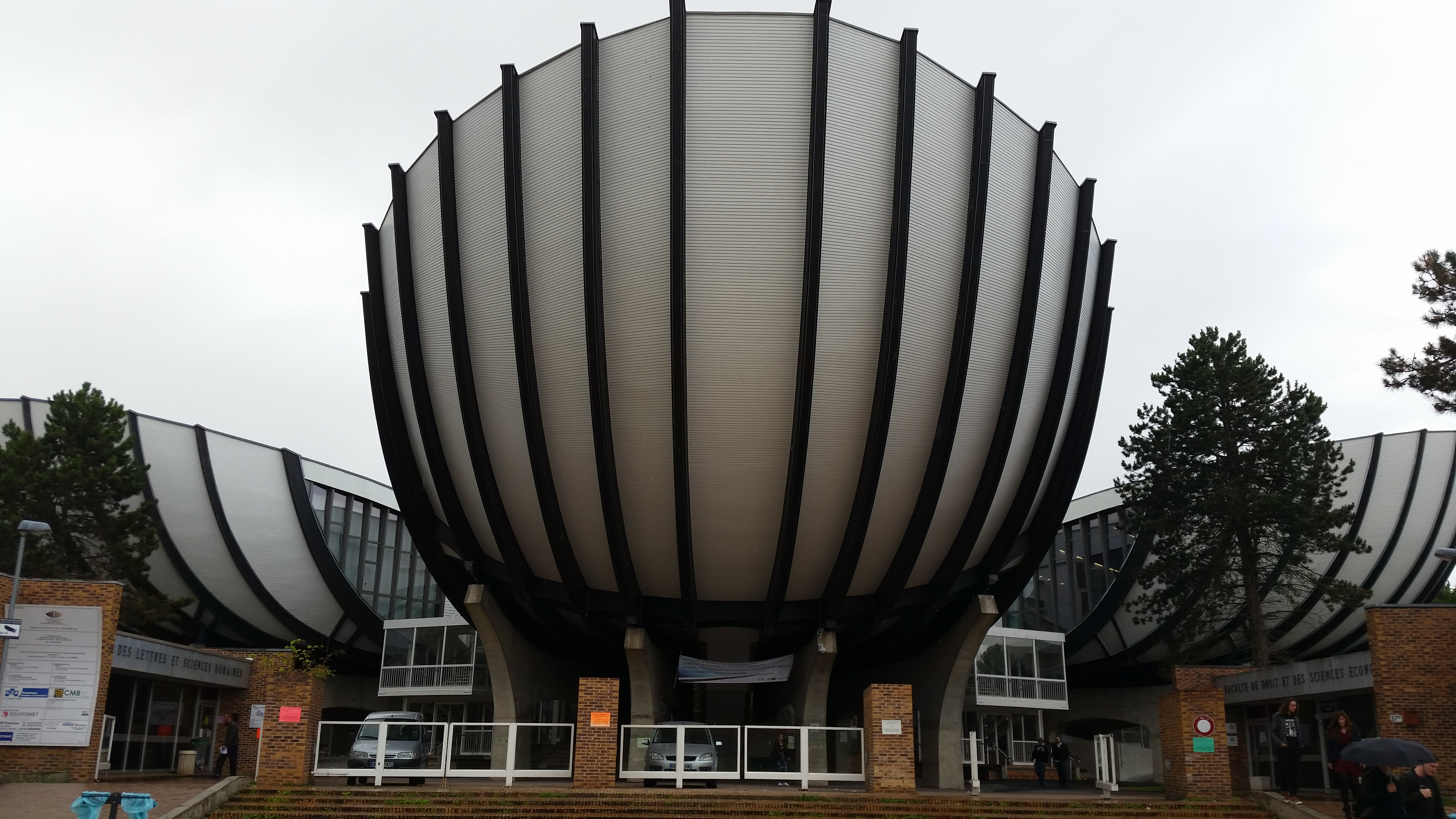
- Place Bergson
- Type: Public
- Established: 1548–1793 (initial formation); 1967 (reestablished)
- Affiliations: AUF, EUA
- Academic affiliations: TPC
- President: Christophe Clément
- Academic staff: 2,468 including 1,411 professors, 1,057 personnel
- Students: 28,786
- Location: Châlons-en-Champagne; Charleville-Mézières; Chaumont; Reims; Troyes, Grand Est, France
- Campus: Small town (Charleville-Mézières, Chaumont), Suburban (Reims), Urban (Châlons-en-Champagne)
- Website: univ-reims.fr
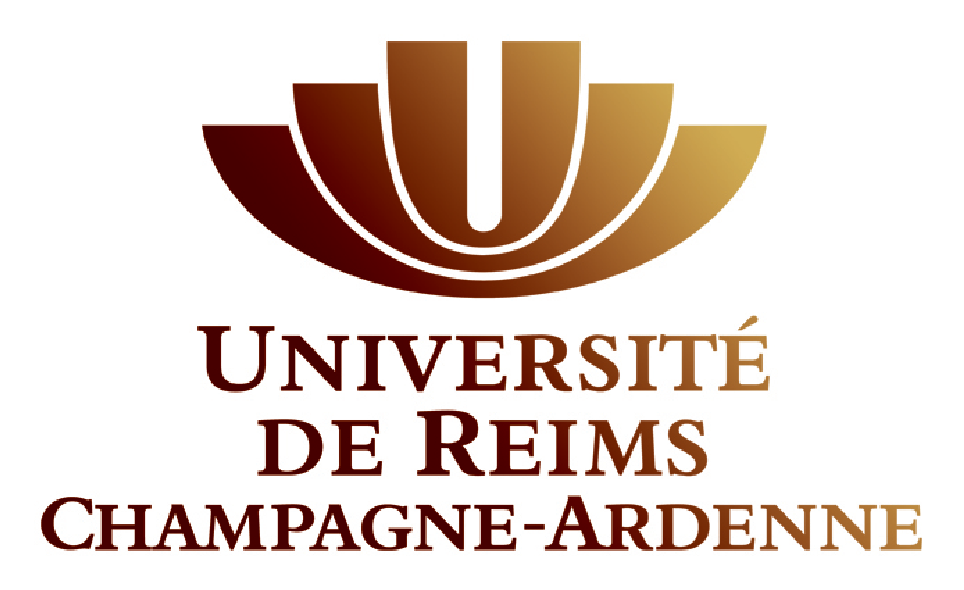

The University of Reims Champagne-Ardenne (French: Université de Reims Champagne-Ardenne; URCA), also known simply as the University of Reims, is a public university based in Reims, France.

In addition to the main campus in Reims, the university has several campuses located throughout the Grand Est region, in Châlons-en-Champagne, Charleville-Mézières, Chaumont, and Troyes.

== History ==
=== Original university ===
The University of Reims was established in 1548, after the Cardinal of Lorraine met with Pope Paul III. The 'Collège des Bons-Enfants' Catholic school thus became a university, teaching the arts, theology, law and medicine. The university was closed in 1793 during the French Revolution, and reemerged in the 1960s.

=== Modern university ===
The Faculty of Science (1961), the Literary University College (1964), the University College of Law and Economics (1966), Reims University Technology Institute (1966), the Faculties of Medicine and Pharmacy (1967), the National School of Dental Surgery (1970) are the institutions from which the University of Reims was formed in 1971. The creation of an IUT in Troyes (1973), an Institute of Higher Technical Education (1985) and an IUT department (1995) in Charleville-Mezieres, the development of a delocalized office of the Faculties of Law, Economics and Humanities of Reims (1991) and the opening of an IUT department in Châlons-en-Champagne (1993) all became part of the university and in 1982, it was renamed the University of Reims Champagne-Ardenne.

=== List of presidents ===
- Michel Devèze (historian), 1971–1976
- Jean Le Men (pharmacist), 1976–1977
- Lucien Bernard (physicist), 1977–1982
- André Laberrigue (physicist), 1982–1987
- Jean Raymond (anglicist), 1987–1992
- Claude Severin (physician and dentist), 1992–1997
- Jacques Meyer (mathematician), 1997–2002
- Mary Gerard (physicist), 2002–2007
- Richard Vistelle (chemist), 2007–2012
- Gilles Baillat (director of the IUFMs), 2012–2016
- Guillaume Gelle, 2016–present

== Organisation ==
=== Training and research ===
The University of Reims Champagne-Ardenne has 8 UFR:

- Law and Political Science
- Letters and Human Sciences
- Economics and Social Sciences
- Natural Sciences
- Sciences and Techniques of Physical and Sports Activities
- Medicine
- Dentistry
- Pharmacy

=== Schools and institutes ===
- 2 IUT (the IUT of Reims-Châlons-Charleville and the IUT of Troyes)
- ESIEC now named ESIReims
- Institute for Higher Technical Training ( IFTS )
- University Institute of Teacher Training (IUFMs)
- School of Midwifery
- University Center
- Institute of Preparation for General Administration

=== Doctoral ===
The university has two doctoral schools: Humanities & Social Sciences, and Technology & Health Sciences.

== Training and research ==
=== Training ===
The five major areas of training at the University of Reims Champagne-Ardenne are:

- Arts, Humanities, Languages
- Humanities and Social Sciences
- Law, economics, management
- Science, Technology, Health
- Science and technology of physical and sporting activities

=== Research ===
Research at the University of Reims Champagne-Ardenne is structured around five departments:

The Life Sciences & Health department whose laboratories are:

- IFR 53 – Research Institute Federations interactions Cells Micro-Environment. IFR 53
- Epidemiological surveillance of vector-borne and parasitic diseases JE 2533
- Extracellular matrix and cell dynamics (MEDyC) UMR 6237
- Plasticity of the respiratory epithelium in normal and pathological processes Inserm 903 UMRS
- Interfaces Biomaterials – Tissue Houses (IBTH) INSERM UMR-S 926
- Cellular and molecular mechanisms involved in the pre-and postconditioning myocardial EA 3801
- Cell Interactions-Parasites: Biodiversity, Pathogenesis, Resistance (ICP) EA 3800
- Health, Aging, Quality of Life and Rehabilitation Topics Fragile EA 3797
- Cellular patho-physiology and Human immune dysfunction. Therapeutic Approach EA 3798
- Inflammation and immunity of the respiratory epithelium EA 4303

The Mathematics, ICT & Nanotechnologies department, whose laboratories are:

- Research Center for Science and Information Technology and Communication
- Mathematics Laboratory Reims EA 4535
- Microscopy and Laboratory Study of Nanostructures (lmen) EA 3799

The Agro-Sciences & Sciences of the Universe and Environment department, whose laboratories are:

- Study Group on Geomaterials and Natural Environments, Anthropogenic (GEGENAA) EA 3795
- Group of Molecular Spectrometry and Atmospheric (GSMA) CNRS UMR 6089
- Fractionation of Agricultural Resources and Environment (FARE) UMR INRA 614-A
- Research Unit of the Vine and Wine Champagne – Stress and Environment EA 2069

The Chemistry & Engineering Sciences department, whose laboratories are:

- Institute of Molecular Chemistry of Reims (ICMR – CNRS-UMR 6229)
- Laboratory Analysis of Mechanical Constraints – Dynamic interfaces transfers to CEA-3304-EA
- Research Group in Engineering Sciences (GRESPI – EA 4301)

The Humanities and Society Sciences department, whose laboratories are:

- CEJESCO Centre for Legal Research on the effectiveness of continental systems – I 1978
- CERHIC: Centre for Studies and Research in Cultural History – EA 2616
- CIRLEP: Interdisciplinary Center for Research on Language and Thought – EA 4299
- CLEA: Cognition, Language, Emotions, Acquisitions – I 2526
- RTDC: Centre for Research on Territorial Decentralization – EA 3312
- CRIMEL: Center for Interdisciplinary Research on Aesthetic and Literary Models – EA 3311
- LIVE: Development and Political Geography – EA 2076
- Laboratory of Applied Psychology – EA 4298
- Lerp: Laboratory for study and research on the professionalization – EA 3313
- MICIG: Contemporary Institutions Governance International Movements – I 2429
- IMO commercial organizations and institutions – EA 2065

== Notable faculty ==
=== Ancient ===
- Dermot O'Hurley (c.1530–1584) – professor of canon and civil law 1574-1588; Archbishop of Cashel, Ireland; executed outside the walls of Dublin, officially for high treason, but in reality as part of the religious persecution of the Catholic Church in Ireland by Queen Elizabeth I. Beatified by Pope John Paul II as one of the Irish Catholic Martyrs in 1992.

=== Modern ===
- Marie-Hélène Schwartz (1913–2013) – mathematician
- Yvonne Choquet-Bruhat (born 1923) – mathematician and physicist
- Michel Sanouillet (1924–2015) – art historian; specialist of the Dada movement
- Roger Brunet (born 1931) – geographer
- Michel Picard (writer) (born 1931) – writer and literary critic
- Alain Badiou (born 1937) – philosopher
- Jean-Pierre Néraudau (1940–1998) – writer and professor of Latin literature
- Claude Gauvard (born 1942) – historian and Middle Ages specialist
- François Jacques (1946–1992) – historian, a specialist on Ancient Rome
- Michèle Artigue (born 1946) – expert in mathematics education
- Dominique Mulliez (born 1952) – epigrapher and Hellenist; head of the French School at Athens from 2002 to 2011
- Beatrice Heuser (born 1961) – historian and political scientist
- Alain Bui (born 1969) – specialist in information technology; president of Versailles Saint-Quentin-en-Yvelines University
- Laure Gauthier (born 1972) – writer and poet

== Notable alumni ==
=== Ancient ===
- Eugène-Louis Doyen (1859–1916) – French surgeon
- James Douglas (1675–1742) – Scottish physician, obstetrician and anatomist
- Ebenezer Gilchrist (1707–1774) – Scottish medical doctor and author
- Dermod O'Meara (1610–1646) – Irish physician and poet, author of the first medical work printed in Dublin in 1619
- Joseph-Ignace Guillotin (1738–1814) – physician and politician; proposed to use guillotine device to carry out death penalties
- George Leyburn (1597–1677) – English Catholic priest, who became President of the English College, Douai
- David Hamilton (1663–1721) – Scottish physician to Queen Anne; diarist
- Claude-Nicolas Le Cat (1700–1768) – surgeon; science communicator
- Louis-Guillaume Le Veillard (1733–1794) – chemist; aristocrat
- Louis Antoine de Saint-Just (1767–1794) – revolutionary, political philosopher, president of the French National Convention, Jacobin club leader, major figure of French Revolution

=== Modern ===
- Janine Cossy (born 1950) – organic chemist
- Mustapha Mansouri (born 1953) – Moroccan politician
- Filomena Embaló (born 1956) – Angolan-born Bissau-Guinean writer.
- Bérengère Poletti (born 1959) – politician
- Christiane Chabi-Kao (born 1963) – Beninese film director and screenwriter
- Xavier Bertrand (born 1965) – politician
- Hawa Ahmed Youssouf (born 1966) – Djiboutian civil servant and politician
- Nicolas Kazadi (born 1966) – Congolese politician and career diplomat
- Yann Moix (born 1968) – author, film director and television presenter
- Mylène Troszczynski (born 1972) – National Front Member of the European Parliament 2014–2019
- Alexis Lemaire (born 1980) – mental calculation world record holder
- David Syed (born 1964) – Head of Sovereign Practice at Dentons Europe
- Teguest Guerma – Ethiopian public health physician
- Ziad el-Doulatli – Tunisian activist affiliated with the Islamist Ennahda Movement
- Pauline Lhote – winemaker based in Napa, California
- Ioan Horga – Romanian university professor of international relations and European studies
- Marina Kvaskoff, French epidemiologist

== See also ==
- List of public universities in France by academy
