= Ebenezer Gilchrist =

Scottish physician

- Born: 1707; Dumfries
- Died: 12 June 1774 (aged 66–67)
- Occupation: Physician

Ebenezer Gilchrist (1707 – 12 June 1774) was a Scottish physician.

== Biography ==
Gilchrist was born at Dumfries in 1707, studied medicine at Edinburgh, London, and Paris, and graduated at Rheims. In 1732 he returned to Dumfries, where he practised with a reputation which extended beyond the locality, until his death, on 12 June 1774. He became known by reviving certain modes of treatment which he found in the ancient writers. In his first papers on nervous fevers (typhus), published in the ‘Edinburgh Medical Essays and Observations,’ vols. iv. and v. (1746–8), he recommended the use of wine and warm baths. His best known work, ‘The Use of Sea Voyages in Medicine’ (1756; 2nd edit., with a supplement, 1757; 3rd edit. 1771; French transl. 1770), contains a very full analysis of the benefits of sea-exercise and sea-air, especially in consumption, together with cases. The analytical or theoretical handling of the subject is judicious and has hardly been surpassed, but the experience is meagre, and limited too much to short voyages. In the ‘Essays Physical and Literary’ (vol. iii. 1770, and reprint 1770), he published an account of the symptoms and circumstances of the sibbens, the endemic form of syphilis among the poor in the west of Scotland, said to date from the Cromwellian occupation. His other papers are a defence of inoculation for small-pox, an account of the epidemic catarrh (influenza) of 1762, and on cases of vesical hypertrophy, all in ‘Essays, Physical and Literary,’ vols. ii. and iii.
