= Pauline Lhote =

French female winemaker based in Napa, California

- Born: Champagne, France
- Education: University of Reims Champagne-Ardenne
- Occupation: Winemaker
- Years active: 2003-present
- Known for: Sparkling wine
- Notable work: Dom Perignon Rosé

Pauline Lhote is a French female winemaker based in Napa, California, known for sparkling wine. She is the current lead sparkling winemaker at Domaine Chandon.

Lhote grew up on a farm in Champagne and earned a degree at the University of Reims Champagne-Ardenne in Reims. Upon graduation, Lhote worked at Moët & Chandon and Nicolas Feuillate in France. In those roles, she performed maturity controls, winemaking trials and cellar work. While at Moët & Chandon, she spent time creating red wines used in producing rosé sparkling wines, including Dom Perignon Rosé.

Lhote came to the United States for a three-month internship at Chandon in Napa, California and stayed on as a permanent employee. Lhote now leads the team that creates Chandon's sparkling wines.
