= Dominique Mulliez =

French hellenist and epigraphist (born 1952)

Dominique Mulliez (1952, Roubaix) is a French epigrapher and Hellenist who was head of the French School at Athens from 2002 to September 2011.

== Biography ==
After he was admitted at the École normale supérieure in 1974, he obtained an agrégation in classical letters, then became a member of the French School in Athens from 1979 to 1984. He specialized in Greek epigraphy and got a State doctorate in 1994 with a thesis (unpublished) entitled Recherches sur les actes d'affranchissement delphiques. He also directed the excavations of the Agora of Thasos.

On leaving the FSA, he was appointed lecturer at the University of Reims (1985) and professor of Greek at the University of Lille III (1995), where he became director of the Unité de formation et de recherche for ancient languages and cultures. In 1998, he founded the HALMA team (History, Archaeology, Literature of Ancient Worlds). In 2002, he was appointed director of the French School of Athens, a function he exercised until 2011. He then held the civilization and Greek iconography Chair at the University Paris-IV Sorbonne, where he taught in particular the history of Greek religion.

Dominique Mulliez is a correspondent member of the Académie des inscriptions et belles-lettres. He was made a Chevalier of the Légion d'honneur July 14, 2010.
