= Pedro Garcia-Velasquez =

French-Colombian composer (born 1984)

Pedro Garcia-Velasquez (born 28 November 1984, Bogotá, Colombia) is a French-Colombian composer and co-founder of Le Balcon ensemble and BabelScores – an online library of contemporary music.

Born in Bogota, Colombia, Garcia-Velasquez began his musical education through the violin at the age of seven. In 2002, he started studying composition at the Pontifical Xavierian University in Bogota under the mentorship of Harold Vasquez-Castaneda. He obtained his degree in 2006. In 2007, he moved to France to continue his studies at the Conservatoire à rayonnement regional de Boulogne-Billancourt with Jean-Luc Hervé. He was later admitted into the Conservatoire de Paris (CNSMDP) in the class of Frédéric Durieux, where he graduated in 2013.

In 2008, in parallel with his studies in composition, Garcia-Velasquez co-founded Le Balcon ensemble alongside pianist Alphonse Cemin, conductor Maxime Pascal, composer Juan-Pablo Carreño and sound engineer Florent Derex. In 2009, he co-founded BabaelScores, a digital music library, alongside composer Lucas Fagin.

He has been an artist-in-residence at the Théâtre de l’Athénée between 2013 and 2018, at the IRCAM and ZKM on 2017, and at the Fondation Singer-Polignac since 2019. In 2016 he received the Prix Pierre Cardin from the Académie des Beaux-Arts.

== Music composition ==
Pedro Garcia-Velasquez work has explored the concept of Gesamtkunstwerk on several occasions, and from different angles. The idea of a “synthesis of the arts” was already present at a very early stage of his creations and it has evolved through time in increasingly complex ways. In 2012, he started a collaboration with scene-artist Nieto in order to conceive Scratched Shadows, a piece with video-stage musicians. This cooperation opened Garcia-Velasquez to new possibilities in terms of what forms of arts, such as video, dance, installation, or sculpture, could be integrated into the composition's creation process. Long-term cooperation with choreographer Tatiana Julien, from 2012 to 2017, brought to life several pieces integrating dance and composition, among them, INITIO in 2018, a co-written choreographic opera for the Théâtre National de Chaillot. Recently he has been working with artist Marion Flament in the creation of automated sound sculptures integrated into his pieces Un vaso de dicha, for the Fondation Singer-Polignac, and a prelude and interludes for Gustav Mahler’s Das Lied von Der Erde, for the Festival Saint-Denis 2020. One of his main interests is the creation of immersive sound universes using 3D sound techniques, such as specialized sound and the use of the binaural technique (3D sound on headphones). Sound and space are conceived to bring the spectator into a sensory experience evoking specific landscapes, like forests, or buildings such as churches, alongside music. Lieux Perdus – Théâtre acoustique I, for 4 singers, chamber orchestra and 3D sound system, is a piece that developed this idea of surrounding the spectator. It was produced in collaboration with stage director Benjamin Lazar on 2014 and has a sequel, Fête dans le vide : Théâtre acoustique II, for soprano, chamber orchestra, and 3D sound system, produced in 2015.

== Selected works ==
- Leve, Reflejo, Contracorriente, Horizonte, for flauta, guitare and viola, 2003.
- Esperando Llueva, for percussioniste, piano, alto, cello and clarinet, 2004.
- Sueño de Una Nota, for two double bass, bassoon and ensemble, 2009.
- Cras Lucebit, for bassoon and electronics, 2010.
- Plop, for fifteen instruments, 2010.
- Brujería, for saxophone and electronics, 2011.
- Cras Lucebit [German system bassoon], for bassoon and electronics, 2012.
- Scratched Shadows, for video-staged ensemble and electronics, 2012.
- Moro de Venecia, concerto for cello and chamber orchestra, 2013.
- Douve, for trio dancers and chamber orchestra, 2013.
- Lieux Perdus - Théâtre Acoustique I, for 4 voices, chamber orchestra and 3D sound on headphones, 2014.
- Fête dans le vide - Théâtre Acoustique II, for soprano, chamber orchestra, electronics and 3D sound diffusion system, 2015.
- Chants souterrains, for cello and electronics, 2016.
- INITIO, opéra chorégraphique pièce lyrique et chorégraphique, 2017.
- Etudes pour théâtre acoustique, sound installation for 3D sounds and automat instruments, 2018.
- Commanderie 2019, for robotic arms, 3D sound installations and live concerts, 2019.
- Maldoror, à Isidore Ducasse, for flute, two violas and cello, 2019.
- La Selva Virgen, En La Selva Oscura, prologue and interludes to Das Lied von der Erde, for chamber orchestra, robotic arms orchestra and pre-recorded sounds, 2020.
