= Filomena Embaló =

Angolan-born Bissau-Guinean writer

- Born: 1956 (age 69–70); Luanda, Angola
- Education: University of Reims
- Occupation: Writer

Filomena Araújo Embaló (born 1956) is an Angolan-born Bissau-Guinean writer. She is the first woman in Guinea-Bissau to have published a novel.

== Biography ==
Filomena Embaló was born in Luanda, Angola, in 1956 to parents from Cape Verde. She moved to Guinea-Bissau as a teenager, in 1975, and became naturalized there. Embaló then studied economics at the University of Reims in France. She holds a doctorate degree.

The 1998–1999 civil war in Guinea-Bissau sent Embaló into an identity crisis, which she explores in her first novel, Tiara, published in 1999. The first novel to be published by a Bissau-Guinean woman, Tiara deals with the fallout of colonialism in a fictionalized African country. It was published by the Instituto Camões in Mozambique.

Embaló, who writes in Portuguese, went on to publish a short story collection, Carta aberta, in 2005 and a poetry collection, Coração cativo, in 2008.

She has also written magazine and journal articles about Bissau-Guinean economics and literature.

Embaló is an avid campaigner for women's rights in Guinea-Bissau. She has worked as a civil servant at home and abroad, at NGOs including the Latin Union before its dissolution in 2012, and as a diplomat.

== Works ==
- 1999: Tiara (novel)
- 2005: Carta aberta (stories)
- 2008: Coração cativo (poetry)
