= Electrocoagulation =

Electrocoagulation (EC) is a technique used for wastewater treatment, wash water treatment, industrially processed water, and medical treatment. Electrocoagulation has become a rapidly growing area of wastewater treatment due to its ability to remove contaminants that are generally more difficult to remove by filtration or chemical treatment systems, such as emulsified oil, total petroleum hydrocarbons, refractory organics, suspended solids, and heavy metals. There are many brands of electrocoagulation devices available, and they can range in complexity from a simple anode and cathode to much more complex devices with control over electrode potentials, passivation, anode consumption, cell REDOX potentials as well as the introduction of ultrasonic sound, ultraviolet light and a range of gases and reactants to achieve so-called Advanced Oxidation Processes for refractory or recalcitrant organic substances.

== Water and Wastewater Treatment ==
With the latest technologies, reduction of electricity requirements, and miniaturization of the needed power supplies, EC systems have become affordable for water treatment plants and industrial processes worldwide.

=== Background ===
Electrocoagulation ("electro", meaning to apply an electrical charge to water, and "coagulation", meaning the process of changing the particle surface charge, allowing suspended matter to form an agglomeration) is an advanced and economical water treatment technology. It effectively removes suspended solids to sub-micrometre levels, breaks emulsions such as oil and grease or latex, and oxidizes and eradicates heavy metals from water without the use of filters or the addition of separation chemicals

A wide range of wastewater treatment techniques are known, which includes biological processes for nitrification, denitrification and phosphorus removal, as well as a range of physico-chemical processes that require chemical addition. The commonly used physico-chemical treatment processes are filtration, air stripping, ion exchange, chemical precipitation, chemical oxidation, carbon adsorption, ultrafiltration (UF), reverse osmosis (RO), electrodialysis, volatilization, and gas stripping.

=== Benefits ===
- Mechanical filtration addresses only two issues in wash rack wash water: suspended solids larger than 30 μm, and free oil and grease. Emulsified oil and grease cause damage to the media filters, resulting in high maintenance costs. Electrocoagulation does not use particle size to provide physical separation.
- Chemical treatment addresses suspended solids, oil and grease, and some heavy metals, but may require the addion of various flocculants and coagulants as well as pH adjustments for proper treatment. This technology requires the addition of chemicals which can be expensive, messy, hazardous and labor-intensive treatment. This process also requires addition of compressed air for flotation of coagulated contaminants. Generally filtration is used only as a post-treatment phase for polishing.

=== Technology ===
Treatment of wastewater and wash water by EC has been practiced for most of the 20th century with increasing popularity. In the last decade, this technology has been increasingly used in the United States, South America and Europe for treatment of industrial wastewater containing metals. It has also been noted that in North America EC has been used primarily to treat wastewater from pulp and paper industries, mining and metal-processing industries. A large one-thousand gallon per minute cooling tower application in El Paso, Texas illustrates electrocoagulations growing recognition and acceptance to the industrial community. In addition, EC has been applied to treat water containing foodstuff waste, oil wastes, dyes, output from public transit and marinas, wash water, ink, suspended particles, chemical and mechanical polishing waste, organic matter from landfill leachates, defluorination of water, synthetic detergent effluents, and solutions containing heavy metals. Electrocoagulation is not typically used for domestic wastewater treatment.

=== Coagulation process ===
Coagulation is one of the most important physio-chemical reactions used in water treatment. Ions (heavy metals) and colloids (organic and inorganic) are mostly held in solution by electrical charges. The addition of ions with opposite charges destabilizes the colloids, allowing them to coagulate. Coagulation can be achieved by a chemical coagulant or by electrical methods. Alum [Al_{2}(SO_{4})_{3}^{.}18H_{2}O] is such a chemical substance, which has been widely used for ages for wastewater treatment.

The mechanism of coagulation has been the subject of continual review. It is generally accepted that coagulation is brought about primarily by the reduction of the net surface charge to a point where the colloidal particles, previously stabilized by electrostatic repulsion, can approach closely enough for van der Waals forces to hold them together and allow aggregation. The reduction of the surface charge is a consequence of the decrease of the repulsive potential of the electrical double layer by the presence of an electrolyte having opposite charge. In the EC process, the coagulant is generated in situ by electrolytic oxidation of an appropriate anode material. In this process, charged ionic species—metals or otherwise—are removed from wastewater by allowing it to react with an ion having an opposite charge, or with floc of metallic hydroxides generated within the effluent.

Electrocoagulation offers an alternative to the use of metal salts or polymers and polyelectrolyte addition for breaking stable emulsions and suspensions. The technology removes metals, colloidal solids and particles, and soluble inorganic pollutants from aqueous media by introducing highly charged polymeric metal hydroxide species. These species neutralize the electrostatic charges on suspended solids and oil droplets to facilitate agglomeration or coagulation and resultant separation from the aqueous phase. The treatment prompts the precipitation of certain metals and salts:

Chemical coagulation has been used for decades to destabilize suspensions and to effect precipitation of soluble metals species, as well as other inorganic species from aqueous streams, thereby permitting their removal through sedimentation or filtration. Alum, lime and/or polymers have been the chemical coagulants used. These processes, however, tend to generate large volumes of sludge with high bound water content that can be slow to filter and difficult to dewater. These treatment processes also tend to increase the total dissolved solids (TDS) content of the effluent, making it unacceptable for reuse within industrial applications.

Although the electrocoagulation mechanism resembles chemical coagulation in that the cationic species are responsible for the neutralization of surface charges, the characteristics of the electrocoagulated flock differ dramatically from those generated by chemical coagulation. An electrocogulated flock tends to contain less bound water, is more shear resistant and is more readily filterable.

=== Description ===
In its simplest form, an electrocoagulation reactor is made up of an electrolytic cell with one anode and one cathode. When connected to an external power source, the anode material will electrochemically corrode due to oxidation, while the cathode will be subjected to passivation.

An EC system essentially consists of pairs of conductive metal plates in parallel, which act as monopolar electrodes. It furthermore requires a direct current power source, a resistance box to regulate the current density and a multimeter to read the current values. The conductive metal plates are commonly known as "sacrificial electrodes." The sacrificial anode lowers the dissolution potential of the anode and minimizes the passivation of the cathode. The sacrificial anodes and cathodes can be of the same or of different materials.

The arrangement of monopolar electrodes with cells in series is electrically similar to a single cell with many electrodes and interconnections. In series cell arrangement, a higher potential difference is required for a given current to flow because the cells connected in series have higher resistance. The same current would, however, flow through all the electrodes. In contrast, in parallel or bipolar arrangement the electric current is divided between all the electrodes in relation to the resistance of the individual cells, and each face on the electrode has a different polarity.

During electrolysis, the positive side undergoes anodic reactions, while on the negative side, cathodic reactions are encountered. Consumable metal plates, such as iron or aluminum, are usually used as sacrificial electrodes to continuously produce ions in the water. The released ions neutralize the charges of the particles and thereby initiate coagulation. The released ions remove undesirable contaminants either by chemical reaction and precipitation, or by causing the colloidal materials to coalesce, which can then be removed by flotation. In addition, as water containing colloidal particulates, oils, or other contaminants move through the applied electric field, there may be ionization, electrolysis, hydrolysis, and free-radical formation which can alter the physical and chemical properties of water and contaminants. As a result, the reactive and excited state causes contaminants to be released from the water and destroyed or made less soluble.

Electrocoagulation technology cannot remove infinitely soluble matter. Therefore, ions with molecular weights smaller than Ca^{+2} or Mg^{+2} cannot be dissociated from the aqueous medium.

=== Reactions within the electrocoagulation reactor ===
Within the electrocoagulation reactor, several distinct electrochemical reactions are produced independently. These are:

- Seeding, resulting from the anode reduction of metal ions that become new centers for larger, stable, insoluble complexes that precipitate as complex metal ions.
- Emulsion Breaking, resulting from the oxygen and hydrogen ions that bond into the water receptor sites of emulsified oil molecules creating a water-insoluble complex separating water from oil, driller's mud, dyes, inks, fatty acids, etc.
- Halogen Complexing, as the metal ions bind themselves to chlorines in a chlorinated hydrocarbon molecule resulting in a large insoluble complex separating water from pesticides, herbicides, chlorinated PCBs, etc.
- Bleaching by the oxygen ions produced in the reaction chamber oxidizes dyes, cyanides, bacteria, viruses, biohazards, etc. Electron flooding of electrodes forced ions to be formed to carry charge into the water, thereby eliminating the polar effect of the water complex, allowing colloidal materials to precipitate and the current controlled ion transport between the electrodes creates an osmotic pressure that typically ruptures bacteria, cysts, and viruses.
- Oxidation and Reduction reactions are forced to their natural end point within the reaction tank which speeds up the natural process of nature that occurs in wet chemistry, where concentration gradients and solubility products (KsP) are the chief determinants to enable reactions to reach stoichiometric completion.
- Electrocoagulation Induced pH swings toward neutral.

=== Optimizing reactions ===
Careful selection of the reaction tank material is essential along with control of the current, flow rate and pH. Electrodes can be made of iron, aluminum, titanium, graphite or other materials, depending upon the wastewater to be treated and the contaminants to be removed. Temperature and pressure appear to have only a minor effect on the process.

In the EC process the water-contaminant mixture separates into a floating layer, a mineral-rich flocculated sediment, and clear water. The floating layer is generally removed by means of an overflow weir or similar removal method. The aggregated flocculent mass settles either in the reaction vessel or in subsequent settling tanks due to gravitational force.

Following removal to a sludge collection tank, it is typically dewatered to a semi-dry cake using a mechanical screw press. The clear, treated (supernatant) water is typically then pumped to a buffer tank for later disposal and/or reuse in the plant's designated process.

=== Advantages ===
- EC requires simple equipment and is easy to operate with sufficient operational latitude to handle most problems encountered on running.
- Wastewater treated by EC gives palatable, clear, colorless and odorless water.
- Sludge formed by EC tends to be readily settable and easy to de-water, compared to conventional alum or ferric hydroxide sludges, because the mainly metallic oxides/hydroxides have no residual charge.
- Flocs formed by EC are similar to chemical floc, except that EC floc tends to be much larger, contains less bound water, is acid-resistant and more stable, and therefore, can be separated faster by filtration.
- EC can produce effluent with less TDS content as compared with chemical treatments, particularly if the metal ions can be precipitated as either hydroxides or carbonates (such as magnesium and calcium). EC generally has little if any impact on sodium and potassium ions in solution.
- The EC process has the advantage of removing the smallest colloidal particles, because the applied electric field neutralises any residual charge, thereby facilitating the coagulation.
- The EC process generally avoids excessive use of chemicals and so there is reduced requirement to neutralize excess chemicals and less possibility of secondary pollution caused by chemical substances added at high concentration as when chemical coagulation of wastewater is used.
- The gas bubbles produced during electrolysis can conveniently carry the pollutant components to the top of the solution where it can be more easily concentrated, collected and removed by a motorised skimmer.
- The electrolytic processes in the EC cell are controlled electrically and with no moving parts, thus requiring less maintenance.
- Dosing incoming waste water with sodium hypochlorite assists reduction of biochemical oxygen demand (BOD) and consequent chemical oxygen demand (COD) although this should be avoided for wastewater containing high levels of organic compounds or dissolved ammonia (NH4+) due to formation of trihalogenated methanes (THMs) or other chlorinated organics. Sodium hypochlorite can be generated electrolytically in an E cell using platinum and similar inert electrodes or by using external electrochlorinators.
- Due to the excellent EC removal of suspended solids and the simplicity of the EC operation, tests conducted for the U.S. Office of Naval Research concluded that the most promising application of EC in a membrane system was found to be as pretreatment to a multi-membrane system of UF/RO or microfiltration/reverse osmosis (MF/RO). In this function the EC provides protection of the low-pressure membrane that is more general than that provided by chemical coagulation and more effective. EC is very effective at removing a number of membrane fouling species (such as silica, alkaline earth metal hydroxides and transition group metals) as well as removing many species that chemical coagulation alone cannot remove. (see Refractory Organics)

== Medical treatment ==
Electrocoagulation
- MeSH: D004564

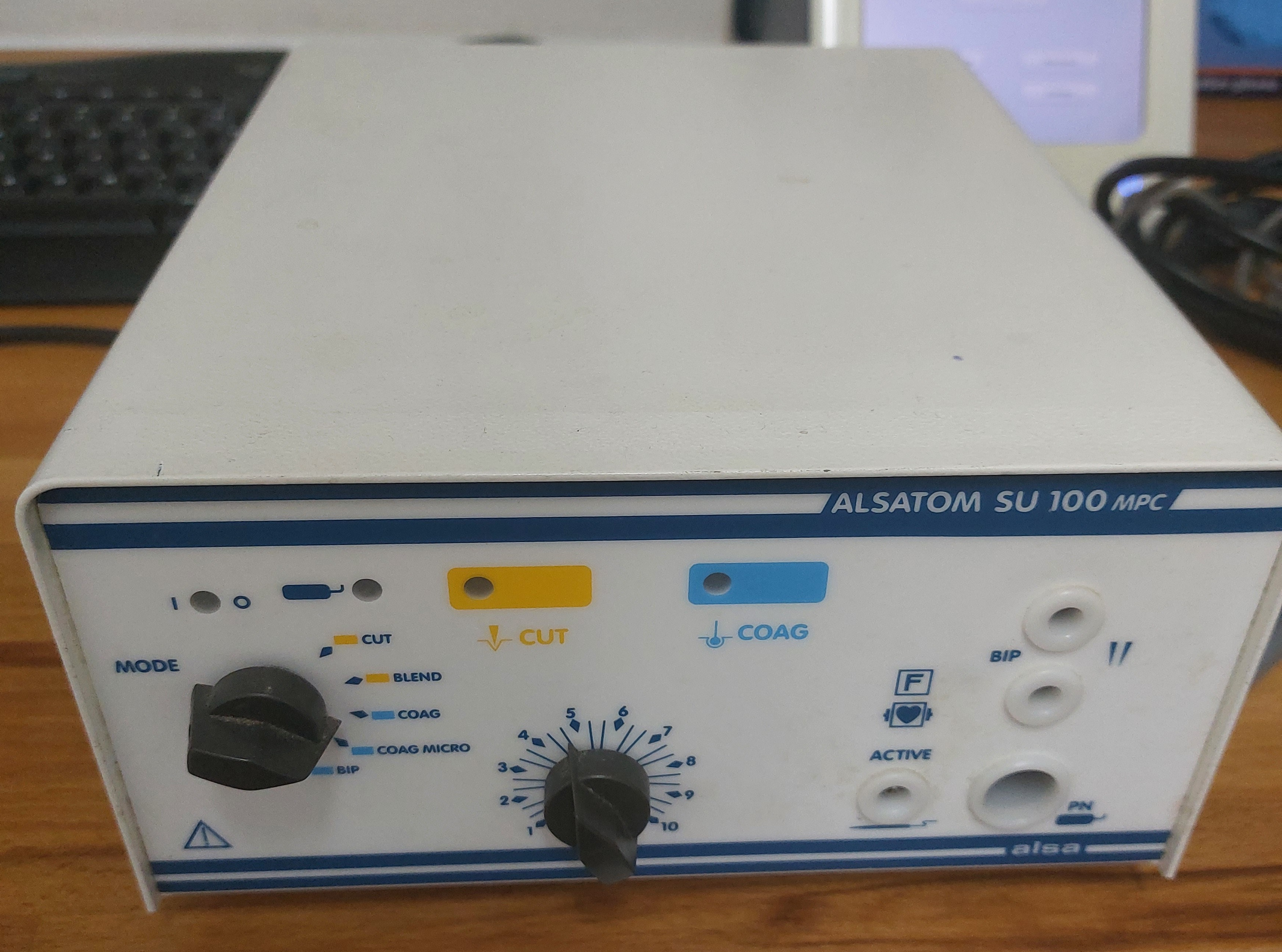
Machine for medical electrocoagulation

A fine wire probe or other delivery mechanism is used to transmit radio waves to tissues near the probe. Molecules in the tissue are caused to vibrate, leading to a rapid increase in temperature, causing coagulation of the proteins in the tissue and effectively killing the tissue. At higher-powered applications, full desiccation of tissue is possible.

== See also ==
- List of wastewater treatment technologies
- Industrial wastewater treatment
- Coagulation (water treatment)
