= Adulai Djabi Embalo =

Luxembourgish footballer

Personal information
- Date of birth: 30 June 2005 (age 21)
- Place of birth: Luxembourg City, Luxembourg
- Height: 1.88 m (6 ft 2 in)
- Position: Forward

Team information
- Current team: Kapfenberger SV
- Number: 27

Youth career
- Käerjéng
- 2020–2022: Fola Esch

Senior career*
Years	Team	Apps	(Gls)
2022–2023	Fola Esch	1	(0)
2023–2026	Virtus Entella	6	(0)
2026–	Kapfenberger SV	1	(0)

International career^{‡}
2019	Luxembourg U15	1	(0)
2024–	Luxembourg U21	7	(0)
2025–	Luxembourg	1	(0)
- * Club domestic league appearances and goals as of 21 August 2026 ‡ National team caps and goals as of 26 March 2026

Adulai Djabi Embalo (born 30 June 2005) is a Luxembourgish professional footballer who plays as a forward for Austrian 2. Liga club Kapfenberger SV and the Luxembourg national team.

== Club career ==
Embalo is a product of the youth academies of the Luxembourgish clubs Käerjéng and Fola Esch. In 2022, he debuted with Fola Esch's senior team in the Luxembourg National Division. In the summer of 2023, he moved to the Italian Serie C club Virtus Entella.

== International career ==
Born in Luxembourg, Embalo is of Bissau-Guinean descent, and holds dual Luxembourgish and Portuguese citizenship. He was called up to the senior Luxembourg national team for a set of 2026 FIFA World Cup qualification matches in November 2025. He debuted with Luxembourg in a 2–0 loss to Germany on 14 November 2025.

== Honours ==
Virtus Entella

- Serie C: 2024–25
