= University of Oradea =

Public university in Romania

Coordinates: 47°02′44″N 21°55′12″E

- Universitatea din Oradea
- Type: Public
- Established: 1990
- Rector: Constantin Bungau
- Faculty: 935
- Students: 14,133 (2015–2016)
- Other students: 4,877
- Location: Oradea, Romania
- Website: www.uoradea.ro

University rankings

Global – Overall
- QS World: 1401+ (2024)
- THE World: 1201–1500 (2024)

The University of Oradea (UO or U of O) (Romanian: Universitatea din Oradea) is an accredited public university located in Oradea in north-western Romania.

With 15 faculties, the university has a total of 123 fields of study for undergraduates and 151 post-graduate specialisation degrees. The university employs 1600 people, of which 935 are teaching personnel, and over 19,000 students (including all forms of studies).

== International relations ==
The University of Oradea is collaborating with 214 universities, institutes and companies from 31 countries. It is integrated in the European Union's Socrates and Erasmus programs. There are over 800 international students enrolled in various Faculties.

== Campus ==
The University of Oradea has three lecture halls, each with 640 seats, 22 amphitheatres with a total of 1940 seats, as well as 60 lecture and seminar rooms. The facilities of the university have a 200-seat dining hall and two dormitories for boarding students. The new library is still under construction which, when completed, will be one of the largest in Romania. The university has an additional facility at Stâna de Vale, in the Apuseni mountains of Bihor county, which includes accommodations as well as educational and recreational facilities.

== Faculties ==
The university has 15 faculties:

- Faculty of Arts
- Faculty of Constructions and Architecture
- Faculty of Economics
- Faculty of Electrical Engineering and Information Technology (formerly Faculty of Electrotechnics and Information Technology)
- Faculty of Energy Engineering
- Faculty of Environmental Protection
- Faculty of Geography, Tourism and Sport
- Faculty of Law
- Faculty of Letters
- Faculty of Management and Technological Engineering; http://imt.uoradea.ro
- Faculty of Medicine
- Faculty of Orthodox Theology
- Faculty of History, Political and Communication Sciences
- Faculty of Science
- Faculty of Social Humanistic Sciences

=== Faculty of Architecture ===
The Faculty of Architecture, founded in 2002, is located in Barbu Stefanescu Delavrancea 4. It has two sections, one for Romanian students and one for international students. Both sections offer students the opportunity to study Sanitary Engineering and Environmental Protection, Cadastral Survey, Civil, Industrial and Agricultural Constructions, and Architecture, in Romanian as well as in the English language.

The Dean of the Faculty of Architecture is Professor Aurora-Carmen Marcia.

=== Faculty of Law ===
The Faculty of Law, founded in 1874, is located in General Magheru 26. It has two sections, one for Romanian students and one for international students. Both sections offer the courses of Roman Law, Criminal Law, Civil Law, Commercial and Cambia Law, Financial Law as well as Common and Canon Law.

Since the introduction of Romania into the European Union, the Faculty of Law has modified its curriculum offering courses on European Law.

The Dean of the Faculty of Law is Professor Cristian Mihes, Ph.D.

=== Faculty of Medicine ===
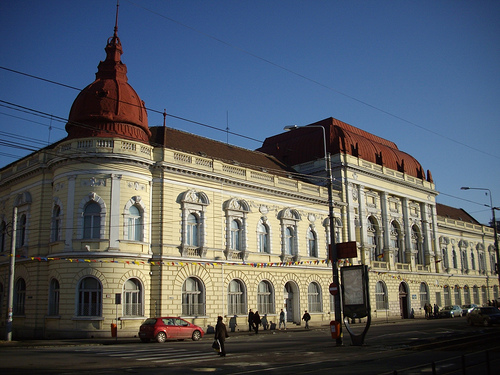
The Faculty of Medicine of the University of Oradea

The Faculty of Medicine of the University of Oradea, which was founded in 1991, is located in Piata 1 Decembrie 10. It has two sections, one for Romanian students and one for international students. The international section, which has over 500 students from all over the world, gives foreign students the opportunity to study medicine, in courses taught entirely in the English language. The Faculty has a 6-year curriculum, which was developed in collaboration with Harvard University and several other US universities, and the languages of instruction are Romanian and English. Currently, there are six university hospitals for general and specialized care, with a total of 2,987 beds.

The Faculty of Dentistry, located in the building of Piata Creanga 2, has one of the Dentistry laboratories. A second section of the Faculty, is located in the building of Piata 1 Decembrie 10. The Faculty has a 6-year curriculum and the language of instruction is Romanian.

The Faculty of Pharmacy, which was founded in 1992, is located in Strada Castanilor 2. The Faculty has a 5-year curriculum and the language of instruction is Romanian.

The clinical courses take place in the Bihor County Hospital, the Municipality Hospital and the Pelican Hospital.

After an initiative of the Dean of the Faculty of Medicine Professor Dr. Gheorghe Bumbu, the Faculty of Medicine of the University of Oradea is following the educational method which was first applied by Leiden University, in which medical students are given the opportunity to present the topics of their lectures, supervised by their professors.

==== Conferences ====
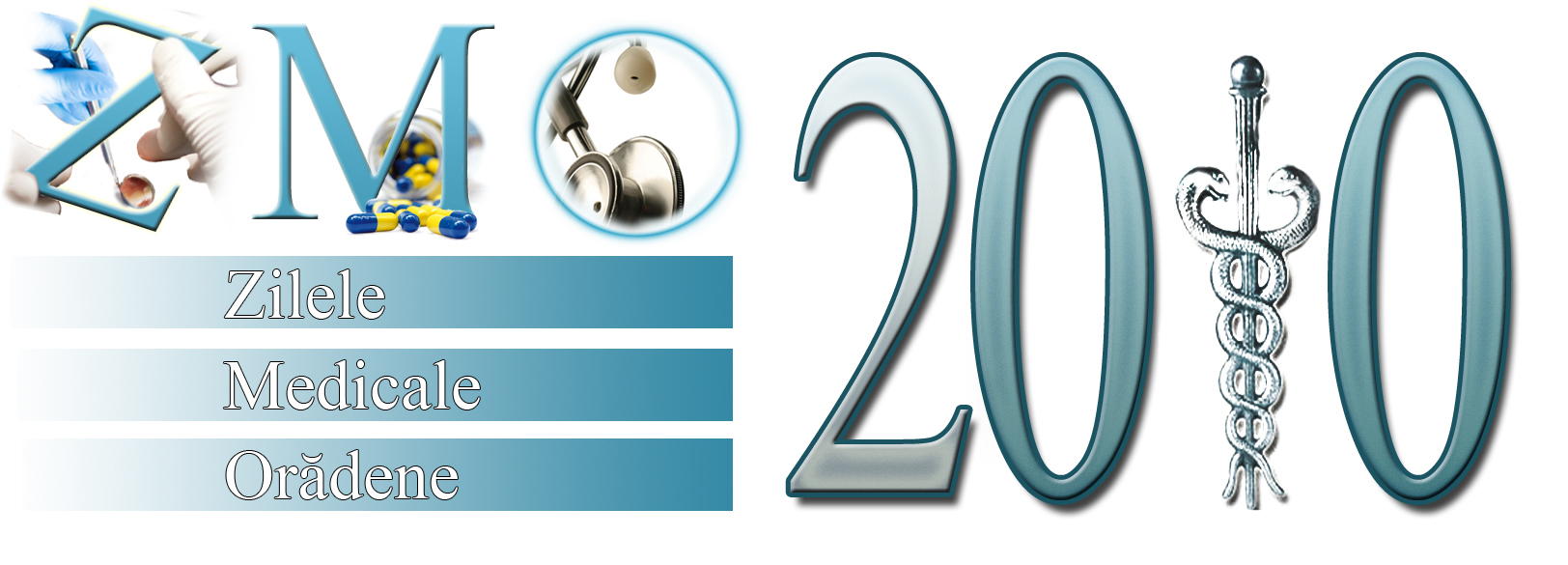
Medical Days of Oradea 2010

===== Medical Days of Oradea =====
Medical Days of Oradea (Romanian: Zilele Medicale Oradene) is the annual congress organised by the Faculty of Medicine and Pharmacy of the University of Oradea. During the Medical Days of Oradea, doctors and medical students from all over the country have the opportunity to present the outcomes of their research.

===== Search and Rescue =====
Search and Rescue is the annual conference of Emergency Medicine and Rescuing in Special Situations, organised by the Faculty of Medicine of the University of Oradea, S.A.R.T.I.S.S., S.M.U.R.D. and Salvamont Rescue Team.

==== Seminars ====
Beginning in Academic Year 2010 - 2011, the Faculty of Medicine of the University of Oradea organizes various training seminars, such as the Emergency Medicine Club and Trauma Suturing Skills.

==== Research ====
Biobaza, the newly founded research center of the Faculty of Medicine and Pharmacy, is located in the center of the city.

==== Publications ====
The Faculty of Medicine of the University of Oradea publishes the Oradea Medical Journal which is an interdisciplinary medical journal focusing on the continuing education of primary health care providers all around the world.

==== Activities ====
Various activities are part of the academic curriculum. A freshmen's party, which is organised annually by the Faculty of Medicine and Pharmacy, is the traditional event welcoming the new students.

The International Evening, organised by the Faculty of Medicine and Pharmacy, is one of the most spectacular events of the academic year. During the event, students from all over the world offer a traditional dinner, while giving the opportunity to their guests, to have a small impression of their cultures and traditions through presentations and musical shows.

The Spring Barbeque, taking place on the first Friday of May, occurs in parallel with a medical books market, as well as various other competitions.

==== Summer Camping ====
Medical Adventure School on Holidays (MASH) is an annual summer training camping for medical students that started in 2001. It offers first aid courses, training for rescues in special situations, as well as various competitions and team tasks, to medical students from all over Europe.

MASH is organised by S.A.R.T.I.S.S. and the Association of Medical Students of the University of Oradea. The Faculty of Medicine of the University of Oradea, Salvamont Rescue Team, the Romanian Red Cross and S.M.U.R.D. of Bihor County are some of the co-organizers.
