= Cergy-Pontoise University =

University in Cergy-Pontoise, France

Coordinates: 49°02′20″N 2°04′30″E

- Université de Cergy-Pontoise
- Type: Public
- Active: 1991–2020
- Affiliations: University of Paris-Seine
- Endowment: €122 M
- President: François Germinet
- Vice-president: Louis L'Haridon
- Academic staff: 1,003
- Administrative staff: 666
- Students: 11,338
- Location: Cergy-Pontoise, France
- Website: www.u-cergy.fr

Cergy-Pontoise University (French: Université de Cergy-Pontoise, pronounced [ynivɛʁsite də sɛʁʒi pɔ̃twaz]) was a French university, located in Cergy-Pontoise, France. On 1 January 2020, the university merged with the International School of Information Processing Sciences (EISTI) and the University of Paris-Seine to form CY Cergy Paris University.

Cergy-Pontoise University is a public university and a leading centre of teaching and research, which welcomes 18,000 students and 1,500 international students interested in studying abroad.

The university is located in the west of Paris (30 km from central Paris), in the Val-d'Oise department.

The university also managed the Institut d'études politiques de Saint-Germain-en-Laye (in cooperation with the Versailles Saint-Quentin-en-Yvelines University).

== Faculties ==
The university offers all levels of graduate and post-graduate studies. 144 bachelors, masters and doctorate degrees are available in a wide range of fields : law, economy and management, languages, literature and social sciences, and science and technology.

A specialty is a German-French course of law studies organized together with the University of Düsseldorf which annually gives 15 German and 15 French law students the possibility to study both legal systems since 2005. Graduates of this three year law course are awarded the German legal "Zwischenprüfung" (German LL.B. equivalent) as well as the French "licence mention droit" (French LL.B. equivalent). Since 2008, the universities offer a subsequent two-year course whose participants specialize in business, labor as well as employment law and graduate with the French "Master 2 mention droit de l'entreprise" (French J.D. equivalent). Subsequently, they are also eligible for the German state examination in law (German J.D. equivalent) and for an admission exam with a French attorney's law school (École de formation de barreau - EFB).

== Research pole ==
The Cergy-Pontoise University as well as all upper education institutions of Cergy-Pontoise are organized in a PRES (Research and Upper Education Pole) including :

- CY Tech, formerly EISTI,
- groupe ESSEC,
- ENSEA, Ecole Nationale Supérieure de l'Electronique et de ses Applications
- ITIN, Ecole supérieure d'Informatique, Réseaux et Systèmes d'Information
- ENSAPC, École nationale supérieure d'arts de Cergy-Pontoise
- EBI (École de Biologie Industrielle)
- EPMI ( École d'électricité, de Production et des Méthodes Industrielles)
- EPSS (École Pratique de Service Social)
- ESCOM (École supérieure de chimie organique et minérale)
- ILEPS (Institut Libre d'Éducation Physique Supérieur)
- ISTOM (Institut Supérieur d'agro-développement)
- ESCIA, école supérieure de comptabilité, gestion et finance

== See also ==
- Education in France
- List of public universities in France by academy
