= CY Cergy Paris University =

University in Cergy-Pontoise, France

Coordinates: 49°02′20″N 2°04′30″E

- CY Cergy Paris Université
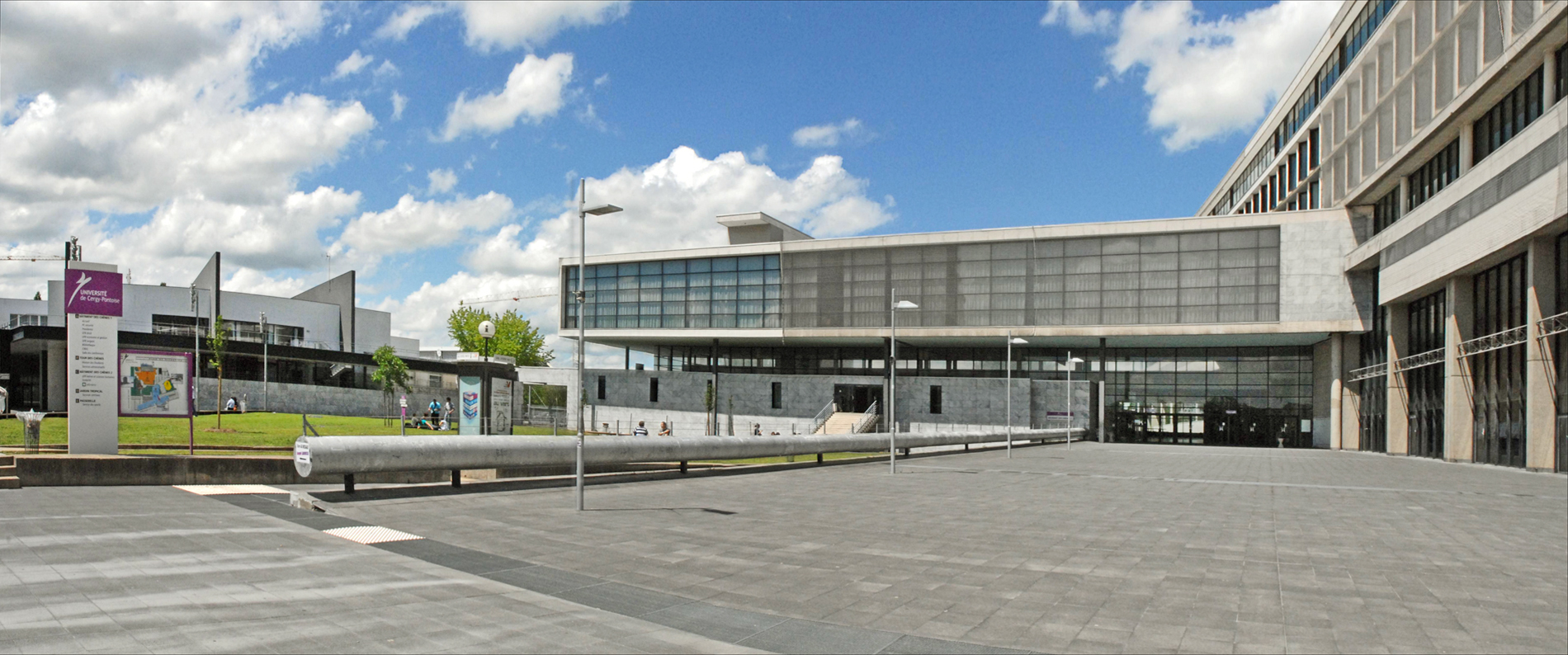
- Type: Public
- Established: 2020
- Affiliations: EUA
- President: Laurent Gatineau
- Location: 33 boulevard du Port, 95000, Cergy-Pontoise, France
- Campus: multi sites
- Website: www.cyu.fr

CY Cergy Paris University (French: CY Cergy Paris Université) is a public university located in Cergy-Pontoise, France. It was officially announced in October 2019 by the décret that the university would be founded by combining other institutions on 1 January 2020. The official status of the university is an experimental institution.

University rankings

Global – Overall
- QS World: 951-1000 (2026)

== History ==
The university was created from the merger of several schools of the University of Paris-Seine (ComUE), Cergy-Pontoise University and the École internationale des sciences du traitement de l'information - EISTI. The École pratique de service social - EPSS and the Institut libre d'éducation physique supérieur - ILEPS will become component institutions of the new university.

The other schools in the old University of Paris-Seine will become members of the CY Alliance.

- ESSEC Business School - ESSEC
- ISIPCA (Institut supérieur international du parfum, de la cosmétique et de l'aromatique alimentaire)
- École nationale supérieure d’architecture de Versailles - ENSA-V
- École nationale supérieure du paysage - ENSP-V
- École nationale supérieure d'arts de Paris-Cergy - ENSAPC
- École nationale supérieure de l'électronique et de ses applications (ENSEA)
- Supméca (Institut Supérieur de Mécanique de Paris)
- École de Biologie Industrielle - EBI
- École d'électricité, de production et des méthodes industrielles - ECAM-EPMI
- École supérieure d'Informatique, réseaux et systèmes d'information - ITESCIA
- École d'ingénieur d'agro-développement international - ISTOM

== Faculties ==
=== CY SUP ===
All the former undergraduate faculties of the University of Cergy-Pontoise will be reorganised as a new undergraduate school which will be named CY SUP.

=== Graduate Schools ===
There will be five graduate schools:

- CY Tech, a Grande Ecole, on sciences, engineering, economy and administration, with engineering education from the EISTI
- CY Art and Humanity, in association with the ENSAPC, the ENSAV, the ENSP, and the INP
- CY Education, with the INSPÉ, the EPSS, and the ILEPS
- CY Law and Political Science
- ESSEC

=== Research ===
There will be an institute of advanced studies named CY Advanced Studies.

== See also ==
- Education in France
- List of public universities in France by academy
