= École nationale supérieure de l'électronique et de ses applications =

Graduate school in Cergy, France

ENSEA
- École Nationale Supérieure de l'Électronique et de ses Applications
- Other name: ENSEA
- Type: Public
- Established: 1952; 74 years ago
- Academic affiliations: Elles Bougent, University of Paris-Seine
- Director: Laurence Hafemeister
- Students: 900
- Postgraduates: 7657
- Location: Cergy-Pontoise, France; 49.0391°N 2.0719°E
- Website: www.ensea.fr

École Nationale Supérieure de l'Électronique et de ses Applications (French pronunciation: [ekɔl nɑsjɔnal sypeʁjœʁ də lelɛktʁɔnik e də sez‿aplikɑsjɔ̃]; abbr. ENSEA) is a graduate school (grande école) of electrical engineering and computer science, located in Cergy (in Val d'Oise department) close to Paris in France.

It was founded in 1952 under the name of ENREA and became ENSEA in 1976.

== Admissions ==
Future engineers are recruited after a centralized and selective country-wide specific entrance examination ("Classes Préparatoires") or laterally into final or pre-final year after a bachelor's degree in electronics or relevant scientific fields (physics, chemistry, electronics, computer science, etc.).

== Programs ==
=== Grande École Degree ===
The Engineering degree (or Diplôme d'Ingénieur de l'École Nationale Supérieure de l'Electronique et de ses Applications) delivered by L'Académie de Versailles; is equivalent to the master's degree in engineering in the United States. Courses spread over three years cover all aspects of electrical, electronics and computer science and engineering, e.g.: signal processing, microelectronics, embedded systems, software engineering, networking, control and power electronics besides some important non-engineering courses such as economics, management, business communications and foreign languages.

=== M.S. Specialized Masters Programs ===
ENSEA and ITIN offer also an MS Specialized Master labelled by the Conférence des grandes écoles and named TIM (Mobile IT and Telecommunication)

== Specialisations ==
The school presently offers 8 specialisations:

- 1-Electronics, Communications & Microwaves
- 2-Networks and Telecommunications
- 3-Embedded Electronic Systems
- 4-Mechatronics and Complex Systems
- 5-Electronics, Instrumentation and Bioscience
- 6-Control Systems & Power Electronics
- 7-Computer Systems
- 8-Multimedia Systems

== International orientation ==
The school has international links with universities from all over the world, especially in the United States, Germany, Spain and UK. It has dual master's degrees with several American and European universities including Technical University of Munich, Imperial College, Georgia Tech, Illinois Institute of Technology and Suny Buffalo. ENSEA is also a member of the n+i network of engineering schools and admits 10 students from around the world every year through the N+i program.

== Research pole ==
ENSEA as well as all upper education institutions of Cergy-Pontoise are organized in a PRES (Research and Upper Education Pole) including :

- Cergy-Pontoise University
- CY Tech
- groupe ESSEC
- ENSEA, École Nationale Supérieure de l'Électronique et de ses Applications
- ITIN, Ecole supérieure d’Informatique, Réseaux et Systèmes d’Information
- ENSAPC, École nationale supérieure d'arts de Cergy-Pontoise
- EBI (École de Biologie Industrielle)
- EPMI ( École d'électricité, de Production et des Méthodes Industrielles)
- EPSS (École Pratique de Service Social)
- ESCOM (École supérieure de chimie organique et minérale)
- ILEPS (Institut Libre d’Éducation Physique Supérieur)
- ISTOM (Institut Supérieur d’agro-développement)
- ESCIA, École supérieure de comptabilité, gestion et finance

== Alumni ==
Since its founding in 1952, ENSEA has produced more than 7600 graduates.

- Thierry Boisnon – Country Senior Officer of Nokia France and Vice President Strategy & Portfolio Nokia Services of Nokia Group
- Pierre-Emmanuel Calmel – CoFounder and CTO of Devialet
- Christophe Duhamel – CoFounder and CEO of Marmiton.org
- Arnaud Fleurent-Didier – French singer
- Christophe Gourlay – Chief Purchasing Officer of Alstom
- Frank Terner – ex-CEO of Air France.
