= Paul Polman =

Dutch businessman (born 1956)

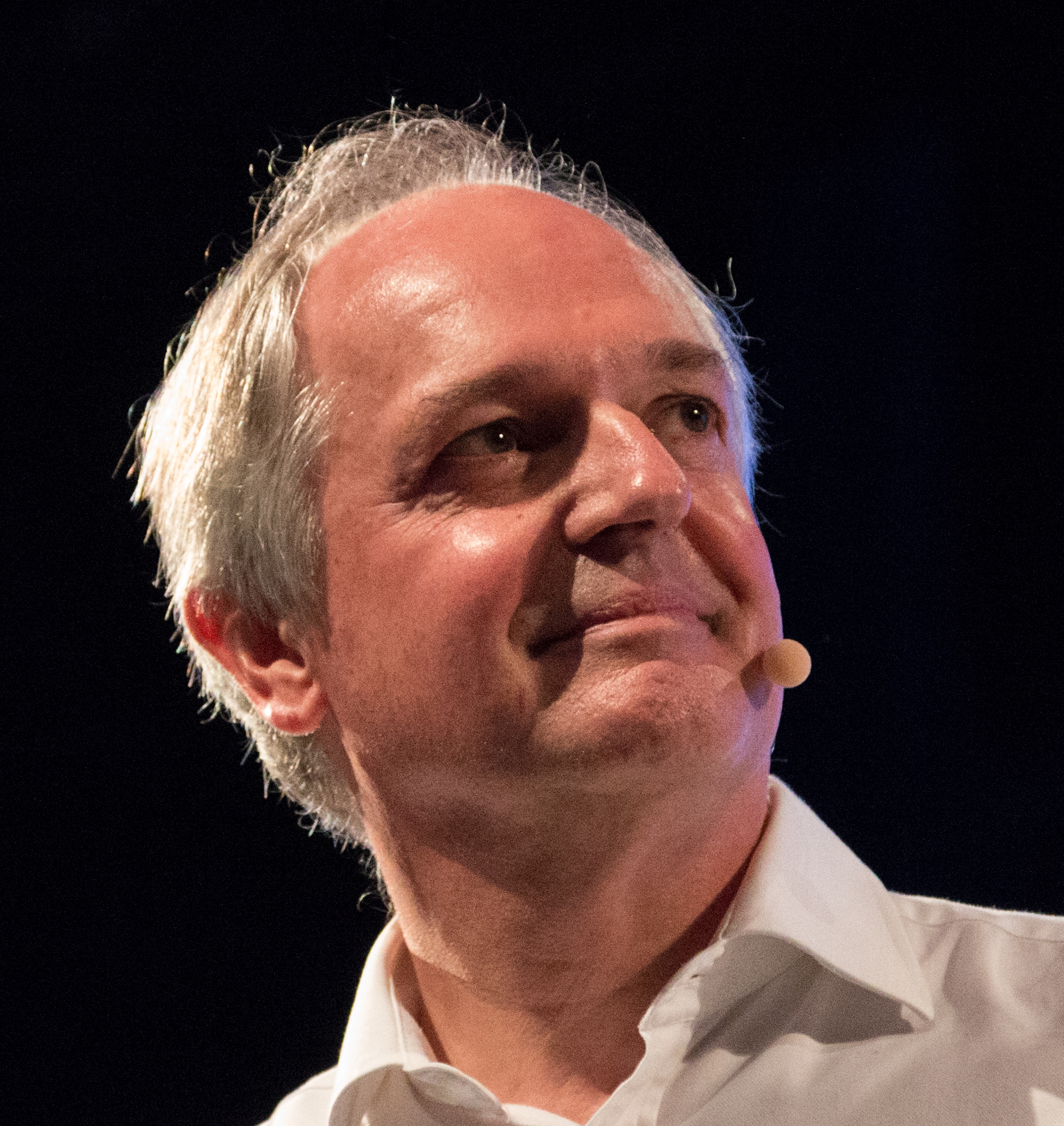
- Polman in 2014
- Born: Paulus Gerardus Josephus Maria Polman; 11 July 1956 (age 70); Enschede, Netherlands
- Education: University of Groningen (BA, BBA); University of Cincinnati (MA, MBA)
- Occupation: Businessman
- Years active: 1979–present
- Title: Former CEO, Unilever
- Term: 2009–2019
- Predecessor: Patrick Cescau
- Successor: Alan Jope
- Spouse: Kim Polman
- Children: 3
- Website: paulpolman.com

Paulus Gerardus Josephus Maria Polman (born 11 July 1956) is a Dutch business executive and author.

== Early life ==
Polman was born and raised in Enschede, Netherlands, in a Catholic family with three brothers and two sisters. His father was a tire company executive, and his mother was a former schoolteacher. He briefly considered becoming a priest as a teenager.

=== Education ===
He initially hoped to study medicine, but was not selected through the medical school lottery. He instead attended the University of Groningen, graduating with a Bachelor of Business Administration and a bachelor's degree in 1977.

In 1979, he completed a master's degree in economics and a Master of Business Administration in finance and international marketing at the University of Cincinnati.

Polman received an honorary doctorate from the University of Groningen in June 2014, during its 400th anniversary celebrations.

In May 2018, he received a second honorary doctorate from George Mason University, where he also delivered the commencement address, speaking on social inclusion, responsibility, and collective action.

== Career ==
=== Procter & Gamble ===
Polman worked for Procter & Gamble (P&G) for 27 years, starting in 1979 as a cost analyst. He later was managing director of P&G UK from 1995 to 1998, president of global fabric care from 1998 to 2001, and group president for P&G Europe in 2001.

=== Nestlé ===
Polman joined Nestlé in 2006 as chief financial officer. In February 2008, he became vice president and head of the Americas branch.

=== Unilever ===
Polman was chief executive officer of Unilever from 2009 to 2019. On 1 January 2009, Polman succeeded Patrick Cescau as chief executive officer of Unilever. During his tenure, the company launched the Unilever Sustainable Living Plan, a strategy focused on reducing the company’s environmental impact and expanding social initiatives.

He discontinued short-term earnings guidance, stating that quarterly targets encouraged decisions that harmed long-term performance. Polman also said he aimed to increase the share of Unilever’s sales in emerging markets from 57 percent (up from 47 percent in 2008) to 70 percent.

In 2013 and 2014, Unilever missed sales targets in six of eight quarters, prompting criticism from some shareholders, who questioned Polman’s emphasis on sustainability. Polman attributed the shortfalls to currency fluctuations and slower growth in emerging markets rather than company strategy.

In 2016, Polman’s total compensation was €8.3 million, including a base salary of €1.2 million.

A 2017 Bernstein report ranked Unilever first among peers for market-share gains not driven by acquisitions and rated the company “Outperform."

In 2018, the Financial Times reviewed Polman's ten-year term as chief executive.

Also in 2018, Unilever supported the abolition of the Dutch dividend tax, despite public opposition in the Netherlands.

In October 2018, Unilever cancelled plans to relocate its headquarters from London to Rotterdam.

In November 2018, it was announced that Polman would step down as chief executive officer, with Alan Jope named as his successor, effective 1 January 2019.

=== Systemiq / Imagine World ===
In July 2019, Polman co-founded Imagine World, an organization focused on poverty and climate change. The entity works with corporations on initiatives related to the UN Sustainable Development Goals. In 2022, Imagine World was acquired by Systemiq, with Polman remaining a board member as well as a major shareholder. Systemiq, a certified B-Corporation, is an environmental consultancy firm headquartered in London, focused on environmental strategy and climate-related research.

=== Other activities ===
Polman is a former chair of the World Business Council for Sustainable Development and sat on the board of directors of the Consumer Goods Forum, leading its sustainability efforts. He is a member of the board of the UN Global Compact. At the invitation of UN Secretary-General Ban Ki-moon, Polman was one of the 27 members of the UN High Level Panel of Eminent Persons on the Post-2015 Development Agenda. At the invitation of former Mexican president Felipe Calderón, Polman was on the International Council of the Global Commission on the Economy and Climate.

Polman has been on the global advisory board of TPG’s Rise Funds alongside Bono and Jeffrey Skoll. He is co-chair of EQT future mission board with Jacob Wallenberg. Polman is also the co-author of Net Positive: How Courageous Companies Thrive by Giving More Than They Take.

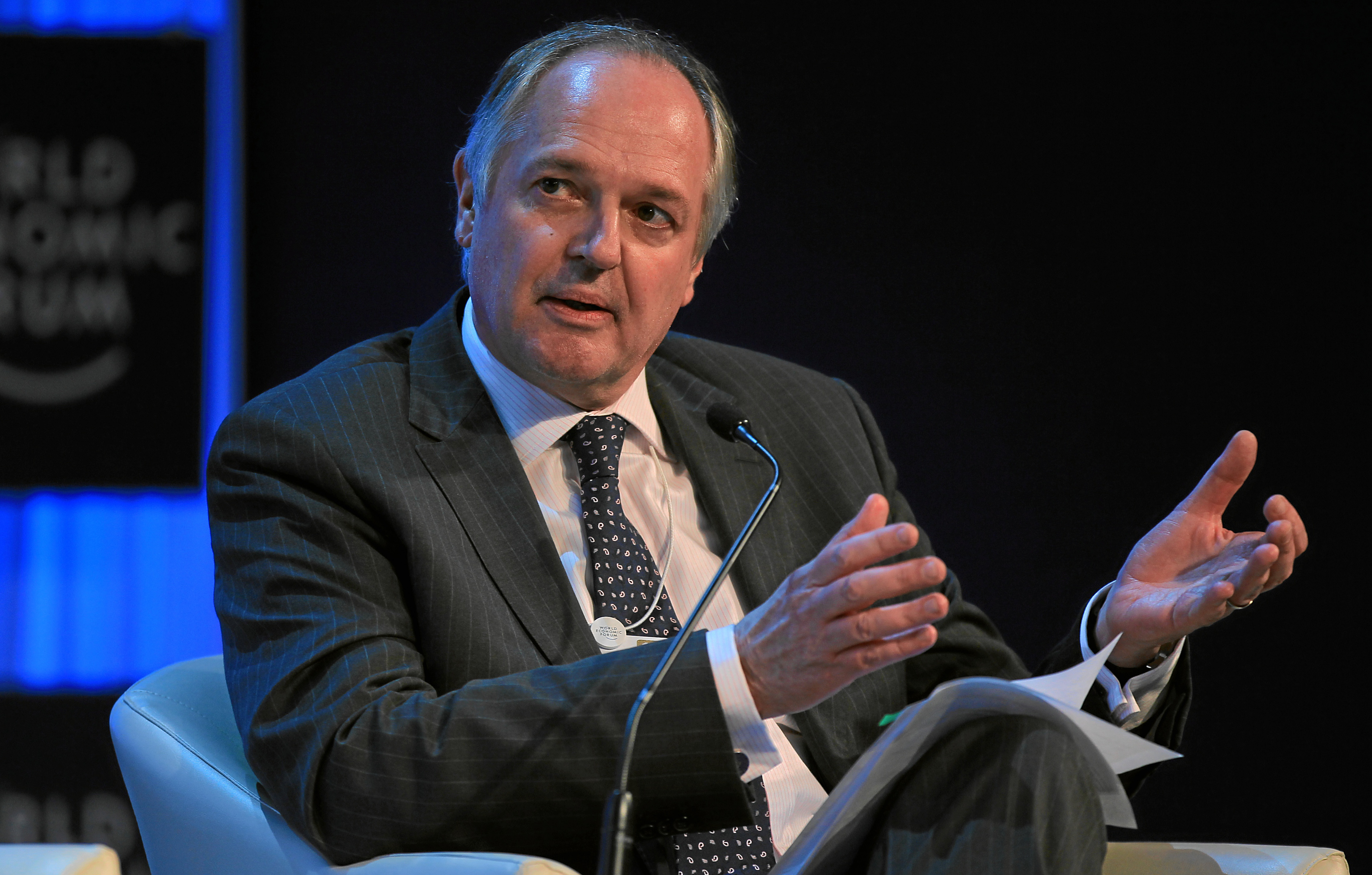
Polman during the WEF 2013

He has co-authored a report published by the International Food Policy Research Institute (IFPRI) that criticizes the efforts of the UN's Sustainable Development Goals (SDGs) as not ambitious enough. Instead of aiming for an end to poverty by 2030, the report, "An Ambitious Development Goal: Ending Hunger and Undernutrition by 2025," called for a greater emphasis on eliminating hunger and undernutrition and achieving this goal by 2025.

Polman co-founded the Dutch Sustainable Growth Coalition, led by former Dutch prime minister Jan Peter Balkenende. He is a member of the World Economic Forum's International Business Council and the Global Taskforce for Scaling up Nutrition (SUN), and he was part of the European Resource Efficiency Platform Working Group, chaired by European Commissioner Janez Potočnik. He was co-chair of the World Economic Forum Annual Meeting 2012. He is a counsellor of the One Young World and trustee of the Leverhulme Trust. Polman was co-chair of the B-20 Food Security Taskforce. Polman was on the board of Unilever from 2009 to 2019. He was formerly on the boards of Dow and Alcon. Polman is part of Leadership Vanguard, an initiative aimed at identifying and supporting the next generation of leaders, focusing on redefining value. He has been a member of IESE's International Advisory Board (IAB) since 2015.

He is president of the Kilimanjaro Blind Trust, a foundation he created alongside fellow climber Erik Weihenmayer to benefit blind children in Africa, and chair of the Perkins International Advisory Board.

In 2016, Polman was selected by former UN Secretary-General Ban Ki-moon to be an SDG Advocate, tasked with helping build widespread support for the UN's SDGs. He was appointed again in 2019 by UN Secretary-General António Guterres.

Polman is co-chair of the Global Commission for the Economy and Climate, with Nicholas Stern and Ngozi Okonjo-Iweala.

He is a member of The B Team, chairing the group from August 2018 to September 2021.

In 2019, Polman was appointed as chair of the board for University of Oxford, Saїd Business School.

In 2024, Polman appeared as himself in the Netflix documentary Buy Now! The Shopping Conspiracy.

== Personal life ==
Polman is married to Kim Polman, with whom he has three sons.

== Selected awards ==
Polman has received the following awards:

- European Business Leader of the year by Wall Street Journal/CNBC (2003)
- Investor Magazine CEO of the year (2010, 2011, 2012)
- Award for Responsible Capitalism (2012)
- INSEAD Business Leader for the World Award (2012)
- WWF's Duke of Edinburgh Conservation Medal (2013)
- Rainforest Alliance Lifetime Achievement Award (2014)
- David Rockefeller Bridging Leadership Award - Synergos (2014)
- Doctor Honoris Causa of Business School Lausanne (2014)
- Oslo Business for Peace Award (2015)
- Chevalier de la Légion d'honneur (2016)
- Singapore Government Public Service Star - Distinguished Friends of Singapore (2016)
- Enactus Entrepreneurial Spirit Award (2017)
- Honorary Knight Commander of the Order of the British Empire (2018)
- Treaties of Nijmegen Medal (2018)
- 14 Honorary Doctorates, including a Doctorate of Laws from the University of Bath
- Recipient of the Lifetime Achievement Award (Champions of the Earth) in 2015
- Academy of International Business (AIB) The International Executive of the Year Award (2023)
