= Caroline Groves =

British bespoke shoemaker (born 1959)

Caroline Groves (born 1959) is a British bespoke shoemaker specialising in women's footwear. She established her own bespoke footwear business in 2003. Her work uses traditional hand-welted shoemaking techniques, alongside decorative techniques and materials. Her work has been exhibited at the Victoria and Albert Museum, including Parakeet in Shoes: Pleasure and Pain. Her work is held by Court Barn and the Museu do Calçado.

== Early life ==
Caroline Groves was born in 1959. Her great-grandfather, Walter Curtis, worked alongside Arts and Crafts movement pioneer C. R. Ashbee in the late 19th century. Curtis joined Ashbee’s Guild of Handicraft in 1889 as a cabinet-maker. Her grandmother was Mary Dyer, an accomplished silversmith and textile artisan who attended evening classes with George Hart and Harry Warmington for 50 years. Groves had a particular interest in leather. This led her to work with a local saddler. She then went on to meet a shoemaker in 1988 and trained with him for several years.

== Career ==
In 2003 Groves established her own bespoke footwear business in London’s West End after acquiring an already established women’s shoemaking business. She worked between London and the Cotswolds. She became a Freeman of the Worshipful Company of Cordwainers on 5 November 2008. She also became a Liveryman. During 2012 and 2013 Groves was based at her Cotswolds workshop while also spending part of the week with Foster & Son in Jermyn Street, London, meeting private clients. During 2020 Groves introduced a made-to-order range of women's shoes, made on standard lasts using hand-welted construction alongside her bespoke work.

== Work and practice ==
Groves makes bespoke women’s footwear using traditional shoemaking methods. The process begins with consultation. She takes foot measurements and carries out discussions of the design. A wooden last is made for the individual client, rather than using a standard pre-made last for bespoke commissions. The process involves at least three appointments: initial measurements and design, a fitting using a mock-up, presentation and final fitting. Groves's bespoke shoes are hand-sculpted using traditional hand-welted techniques.

Her upper leathers have been sourced from France and Italy. The leather used for shoe soles and stiffening has been sourced from an oak-bark tannery in Devon. Alongside leather, her work has also incorporated textiles, embroidery, vintage trims, and specially commissioned decorative components. The Campaign shoes acquired by Court Barn provide a particularly well-documented example: oak-bark-tanned leather, suede, blue linen thread, grosgrain, needlepoint heel covers, English wool, mother-of-pearl and vintage French silk ribbon.

Groves has worked with jewellers and bookbinders and has researched traditional bookbinding techniques and their application to leather. She has commissioned specialist craftspeople to make individual elements for shoes. Milliner Louise Pocock collaborated with Groves, including making miniature hats for shoes commissioned by Whoopi Goldberg.

== Exhibitions and collections ==
In 2015 her Parakeet shoes were included in the V&A exhibition Shoes: Pleasure and Pain. She was also one of five shoe designers and makers interviewed by the V&A about their working process, inspiration and the future of shoes, alongside Manolo Blahnik, Sandra Choi, Marc Hare and Christian Louboutin. The exhibition then travelled internationally. Her Parakeet shoes were prominently used on the official Peabody Essex Museum material for the exhibition in 2016. Her work was included in Court Barn's 2018 Design: Hand Head Heart exhibition. Groves exhibited with taxidermist and naturalist John Burton in Muse, Morph, Create at Broadway Arts Festival in 2021 and gave a talk on her shoemaking practice. Court Barn held Craft, Fashion and Fantasy: Shoes and Hats by Caroline Groves and Louise Pocock, a 2022 exhibition. In 2024 Court Barn acquired Groves's Campaign shoes for its permanent collection, with support from the Arts Council England/V&A Purchase Grant Fund. In 2025 the Museu do Calçado in São João da Madeira, Portugal, accepted a pair of her handmade leather shoes, two shoe boxes and a catalogue.
