= Lelandais =

Lelandais may refer to:

- Marc Lelandais (b. 1966), a French Business Executive.
- Nordahl Lelandais (b. 1983), a French ex-military, involved in criminal cases
