= Anne Lehoërff =

French archeologist

- Anne Lehoërff in 2023
- Born: 1968 (age 57–58); Saint-Malo, France
- Education: Paris 1 Panthéon-Sorbonne University (PhD)
- Occupations: Archaeologist and historian specializing in European Prehistory

Anne Lehoërff (born 1968, Saint-Malo, France) is a French archaeologist and historian specializing in European Prehistory, particularly the Bronze Age and the study of ancient metallurgy.

== Education and early career ==
Lehoërff studied history, archaeology, and archaeometallurgy. A former member of the École française de Rome (1997–2000), she earned her PhD in archaeology in 1999 at Paris 1 Panthéon-Sorbonne University under the supervision of Alain Schnapp and Bruno d’Agostino. Her doctoral thesis on Bronze deposits in central Italy (1200–725 BC) was published in 2007.

She worked on excavation sites in France, Italy, and England, and trained in archaeometallurgy at the Research Laboratory of the Museums of France (now C2RMF).

== Academic career ==
Lehoërff became a lecturer in European Prehistory at the University of Lille 3 in 2000, and professor in 2012, where she founded the Laboratory for the Study of Ancient Metals (LEACA). In 2020, she joined CY Cergy Paris Université, holding the Excellence Chair in Archaeology and Heritage since 2021.

Her habilitation (EHESS, 2009) examined the relationships between craftsmanship, metallurgy, and war, later developed in her book A Call to Arms (Belin 2018; Sidestone 2022).

== Research ==
Her work focuses on European Prehistory from the Neolithic to the Iron Age, the origins of metallurgy, and the social dimensions of metal production and warfare. She has led research on Bronze Age craft, trade networks, and early seafaring, including the European project BOAT 1550 BC (2011–2014).

Lehoërff combines laboratory analysis with historical approaches, emphasizing the epistemology of archaeology and the role of archaeometallurgy in understanding past societies.

Anne Lehoërff at the "Femmes et Archéologie" conference in 2024

== Public and institutional roles ==
From 2014 to 2024, she served as vice-president of the National Council for Archaeological Research (CNRA), coordinating the 2016 and 2023 national archaeological research programs and co-organizing the 2023 Assises de l’archéologie française

She contributes to debates on archaeological ethics, looting, and the restitution of human remains, and promotes the visibility of women in archaeology.

She became president of the scientific board at the Fondation maison des sciences de l'Homme (FMSH) in November 2024.

== Outreach and publications ==
Lehoërff has curated and contributed to major exhibitions, including Beyond the Horizon: Societies of the Channel and North Sea 3500 years ago (2012–2013) and Masters of Fire: The Bronze Age in France (2025–2026).

She directs the public lecture series “Archaeology in the City” and writes regularly for Archéologia magazine.

Her other books include L’archéologie (Que sais-je ?, 2019) and Mettre au monde le patrimoine. L’archéologie en actes (2023).

== Selected publications ==
=== Books ===
- Les mondes du Nord. De la Préhistoire à l’âge viking (with Vivien Barrière, Stéphane Coviaux, Alban Gautier), Paris, Tallandier, 2025.
- Une histoire économique et sociale. La France de la Préhistoire à nos jours (co-author and co-responsible for part 1; edited by P.-C. Hautcoeur & C. Virlouvet), Paris, Passés Composés, 2025.
- L’archéologie française en France et à l’étranger. Assises scientifiques (dir. with N. Grimal), Proceedings of the 2023 meeting, Académie des inscriptions et belles lettres, Paris, 2024.
- Archéologie en musée et identités nationales (1848–1914). Un héritage en quête de nouveaux défis au XXIᵉ siècle(dir. with Catherine Louboutin), Sidestone 2024.
- Mettre au monde le patrimoine. L’archéologie en actes, Paris, Le Pommier, 2023.
- Dictionnaire amoureux de l’archéologie, Paris, Plon, 2021.
- Le Néolithique, « Que sais-je ? » n°4188 [2020], 128 p. (2nd ed. 2023).
- L’archéologie, « Que sais-je ? » n°4122 [2019], 128 p. (2022).
- A call to arms. The day war was invented, Sidestone Press, 2022.
- (ed. with Marc Talon) Movement, Exchange and Identity in Europe in the 2nd and 1st Millennia BC. Beyond Frontiers, Oxford, Oxbow Books, 2017, 304 p.
- Préhistoires d’Europe : de Néandertal à Vercingétorix, Paris, Éditions Belin, 2016, 608 p. — awarded the Prix Bordin 2018 of the Académie des inscriptions et belles-lettres.
- (ed.) Construire le temps. Histoire et méthodes des chronologies et calendriers des derniers millénaires avant notre ère en Europe occidentale, Glux-en-Glenne, Centre archéologique européen, 2008, 358 p.
- L’artisanat métallurgique dans les sociétés anciennes de Méditerranée occidentale. Lieux, formes et techniques de production, Rome, École française de Rome, 2004.
- L’artisanat du bronze en Italie centrale (1200-725 avant notre ère). Le métal des dépôts volontaires, Rome, École française de Rome, 2007, XI-472 p.

=== Articles and contributions ===
- "L'Âge du bronze", coll. « Que sais-je ? », n°4295, 2025, 128 p.
- “De quoi « bronze » est-il le nom ? Un nouveau métal, une nouvelle époque.” In: Claude Mordant & Cyril Marcigny (dir.), L’âge du Bronze en France (2500 à 800 avant notre ère), CNRS Éditions, 2025, p. 17-24.
- “La famille des bronzes : des technologies complexes et des savoir-faire d’excellence.” In: same book, p. 174-183.
- “Et la guerre fut…” In: Blitte H., Lachenal T., Leandri F., Lehoërff A., Paolini H., Peche-Quilichini K. (eds), Âge du bronze, Âge de guerre. Violence organisée et expression de la force au IIᵉ millénaire avant J.-C., Ajaccio, 2021, Piazzola éd., 2023, p. –.
- “L’Âge du bronze n’existe pas !” Bronze 2019 : vingt ans de recherche, Colloque international, suppl. n°7 Bulletin de l’APRAB, 2021, p. 23-33.
- “Rencontre avec nous-mêmes. Les restes humains en contexte archéologique.” Esprit, 457, Sept. 2019, p. 131-142.
- (en) “Value, Craftsmanship and Use in Late Bronze Age Cuirasses.” In: Andrea Dolfini, Rachel Crellin, Christian Horn, Marion Uckelmann (eds), Prehistoric Warfare and Violence. Quantitative and Qualitative Approaches, Springer, 2018, ch. 11, p. 307-326.
- (en) “The imaginary Crested helmet of Vercingetorix : what is creativity in Bronze Age metal production.” In: Johanna Sofaer (ed.), Considering Creativity : Creativity Knowledge and Practice in Bronze Age Europe, Archaeopress, 2018, p. 67-82.
- “Le métal archéologique du côté du laboratoire : mythes et réalités d’un matériau.” In: Sylvie Boulud-Gazo, Théophane Nicolas (eds), Artisanats et productions à l’Âge du bronze, Séances de la Société préhistorique française, 4, Paris, 2015, p. 97-108.
- “L’Âge du bronze est-il une période historique ?” Dominique Garcia (dir.), L’Âge du bronze en Méditerranée. Recherches récentes, Errance, 2011, p. 13-26.
- “Les paradoxes de la Protohistoire française.” Annales HSS, 64-5, Sept.–Oct. 2009, p. 1107-1133.
