= Château Gaillard (disambiguation) =

Château Gaillard or Château-Gaillard may refer to:

- Château Gaillard, a ruined medieval castle, overlooking the River Seine, in Upper Normandy, France.
- Château-Gaillard (Vannes), a French hôtel particulier and an archaeological museum Vannes, Brittany.
- Château-Gaillard, Ain, a commune in the Ain department in eastern France.
- Château Gaillard, a restored mansion in the town of Amboise, France, owned by Marc Lelandais.
