= Pierre Denis =

- Born: 21 March 1964 (age 62); Caen, France
- Education: ESSEC Business School
- Occupations: former Chief Executive Officer, Jimmy Choo Ltd

Pierre Denis (born 21 March 1964) is a French businessman. He was CEO of Jimmy Choo Ltd from July 2012 to March 2020.

== Career ==
Denis is a graduate of ESSEC in Paris. He began his career in perfume and cosmetics and joined LVMH in 1992. In 1999, he was appointed managing director, Asia Pacific, for Parfums Christian Dior; in addition, he took over managing the Dior Couture Asian business in 2004. In 2006, Denis moved back to his native Paris to serve as managing director for Christian Dior Couture in Europe, the Middle East and India. After joining John Galliano in 2008, Denis managed the business side of operations, developing the John Galliano and contemporary Galliano lines, and expanding the licensing business.

He was CEO of Jimmy Choo Ltd, from July 2012 to March 2020. He joined the company from John Galliano, where he also held the position of CEO. He was based in Jimmy Choo's London head office until March 2020.

In March 2020, Denis was tipped to become CEO of Coty where he was a board member.

== Personal life ==
He lives in London with his wife and three children.
