= Jérôme Tafani =

French businessman

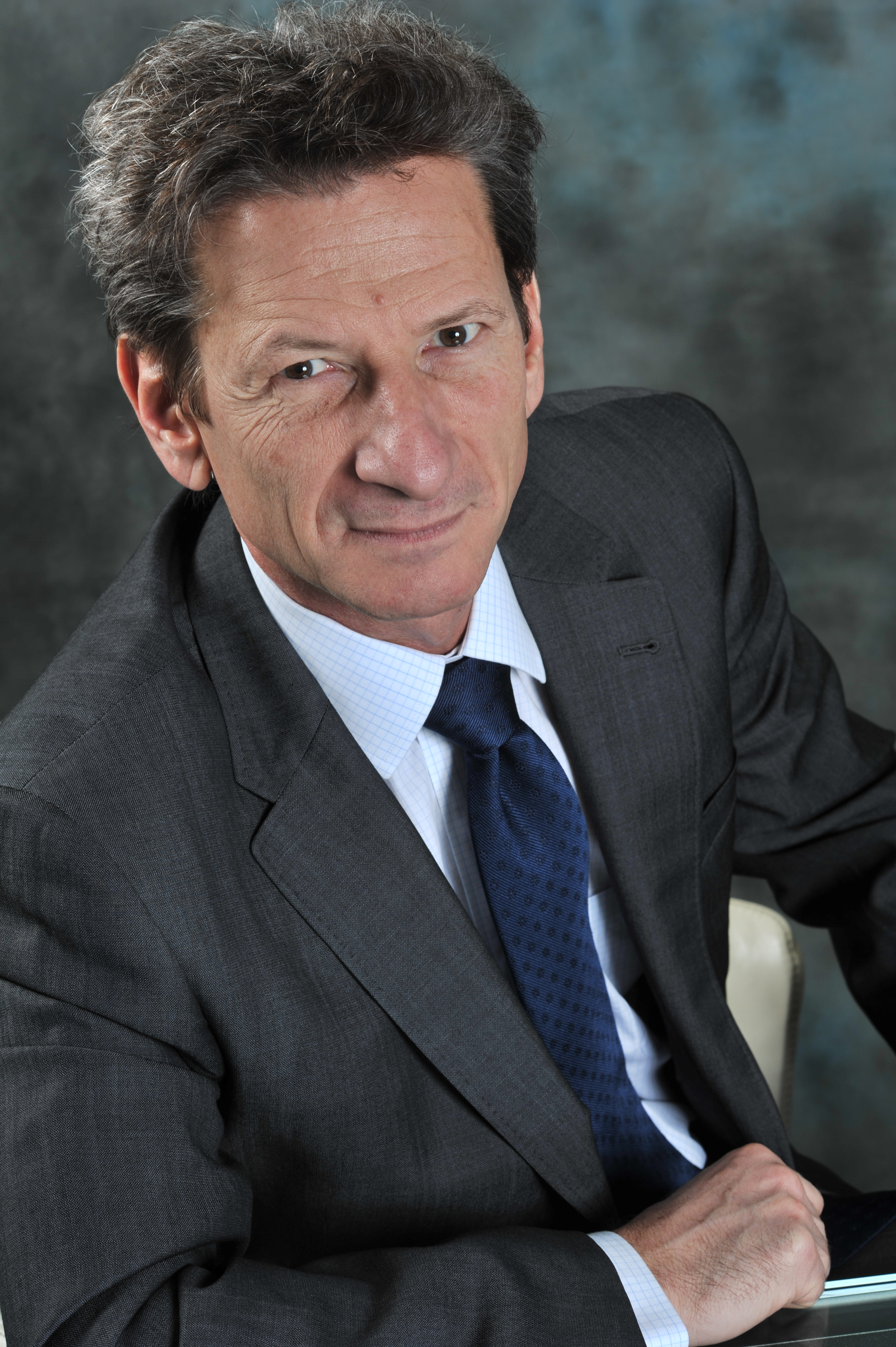
- Tafani in 2012
- Born: 22 April 1958 (age 67); Bourg-en-Bresse, France
- Education: ESSEC Business School
- Occupation: CEO

Jérôme Tafani (born 22 April 1958) is a French financier and CEO of Burger King Restauration, a group managing Burger King restaurants in France.

== Education ==
Tafani received an MBA from ESSEC Business School in 1980.

== Career ==
In 1981-88, Tafani started working as an auditor for Deloitte France. In 1988, he switched to become financial controller at Econocom Group. In 1992, he began working at Randstad in their financial section.

In 1996, Tafani started working at the French section of the American McDonald's Corporation. He rose in ranks to become the company's chief financial officer for Europe in 2009. He then combined the job of Deputy CEO of McDonald's France, where he was also in charge of development and franchising. He left McDonald's in 2014.

In 2015 and 2016, Tafani was executive director of Chipotle Mexican Grill Europe.

In June 2016, Tafani became CEO of a new group combining Quick and Burger King France, constituted by Groupe Bertrand holding company. Initially, Tafani planned to gradually transform all Quick restaurants in France to become Burger Kings. This project was abandoned in 2019, and Groupe Bertrand sold Quick to H.I.G. Capital in 2021.

Under Tafani's leadership, France became Burger King's second most important market in the world, behind the United States. As Burger King expanded its menu to include soy-based vegetarian products, Tafani assures that those sold in France do not contain GMOs.

As of 2022, Tafani has a leadership position in 13 companies, including financial and holding firms.
