= Patrick Cescau =

French chief executive (born 1948)

- Born: 27 September 1948 (age 77); Paris, France
- Education: ESSEC Business School; INSEAD
- Occupation: Businessman
- Spouse: Ursula Kadansky
- Children: 2

Patrick Cescau (born 27 September 1948) is a French businessman and a former chief executive of Unilever. He was the first combined chief executive of the English (originally Lever Brothers) and Dutch parts (originally Margarine Unie) of Unilever. Since 2013, he has been the chairman of the InterContinental Hotels Group.

== Early life ==
Cescau was born on 27 September 1948 in Paris. He was the son of Louise and Pierre Cescau. He earned a degree in business from ESSEC Business School in 1971. He subsequently earned an MBA from INSEAD.

== Career ==
Cescau joined Unilever France in 1973. In 1980 he became financial controller of Unilever Germany at Union Deutsche Lebensmittelwerke in Hamburg, which makes the Sanella margarine. From 1984 to 1986 he was based in Rotterdam. From 1986 to 1989 he was financial controller of Unilever Indonesia. From 1989 to 1991 he was at Unilever Portugal.

In 1999, Cescau became finance director of Unilever. In August 2000 Unilever announced it would split into two divisions – one for food, and the other for personal care products – whereby in January 2001 he became the Foods Division director (president, food), and Keki Dadiseth became in charge of the personal care division. Alexander Kemner had been in charge of its foods division.

In October 2004, Cescau became chairman of Unilever PLC, staying until April 2005. From April 2005 to 31 December 2008, he was group chief executive of Unilever Group, the third biggest food company in the world. In February 2005 it had been announced that both the Unilever PLC and Unilever N.V. groups would be led by a single chief executive, of which he was chosen, stationed at Unilever House in London.

Cescau was on the board of directors of Pearson PLC from 2002 to 2012, and Tesco from 2009 to 2015. Since 2013, he has been the chairman of the InterContinental Hotels Group.

Cescau was awarded a knighthood of the Legion of Honour in 2005.

== Personal life ==
Cescau married Ursula Kadansky in 1974. They have a son and daughter, and live in Chelsea, London.

Business positions
Preceded by Niall FitzGerald (Unilever PLC) and Antony Burgmans (Unilever N.V.)	Chief Executive of Unilever Group; May 2005 – December 2008	Succeeded by Paul Polman
Preceded by Niall FitzGerald (Unilever PLC)	Chairman of Unilever PLC; October 2004 – April 2005	Succeeded by Antony Burgmans (Unilever Group)
Preceded by Hans Eggerstedt	Chief Financial Officer of Unilever PLC and Unilever N.V. 1999 – January 2001	Succeeded by Rudy Markham
Preceded by	President and CEO at Van den Bergh Foods; 1995 – 1997	Succeeded by
Preceded by Antony Burgmans	Chairman of Unilever Indonesia; 1991 – 1995	Succeeded by
