= Alan Jope =

British businessman (born 1964)

Alan Jope CBE
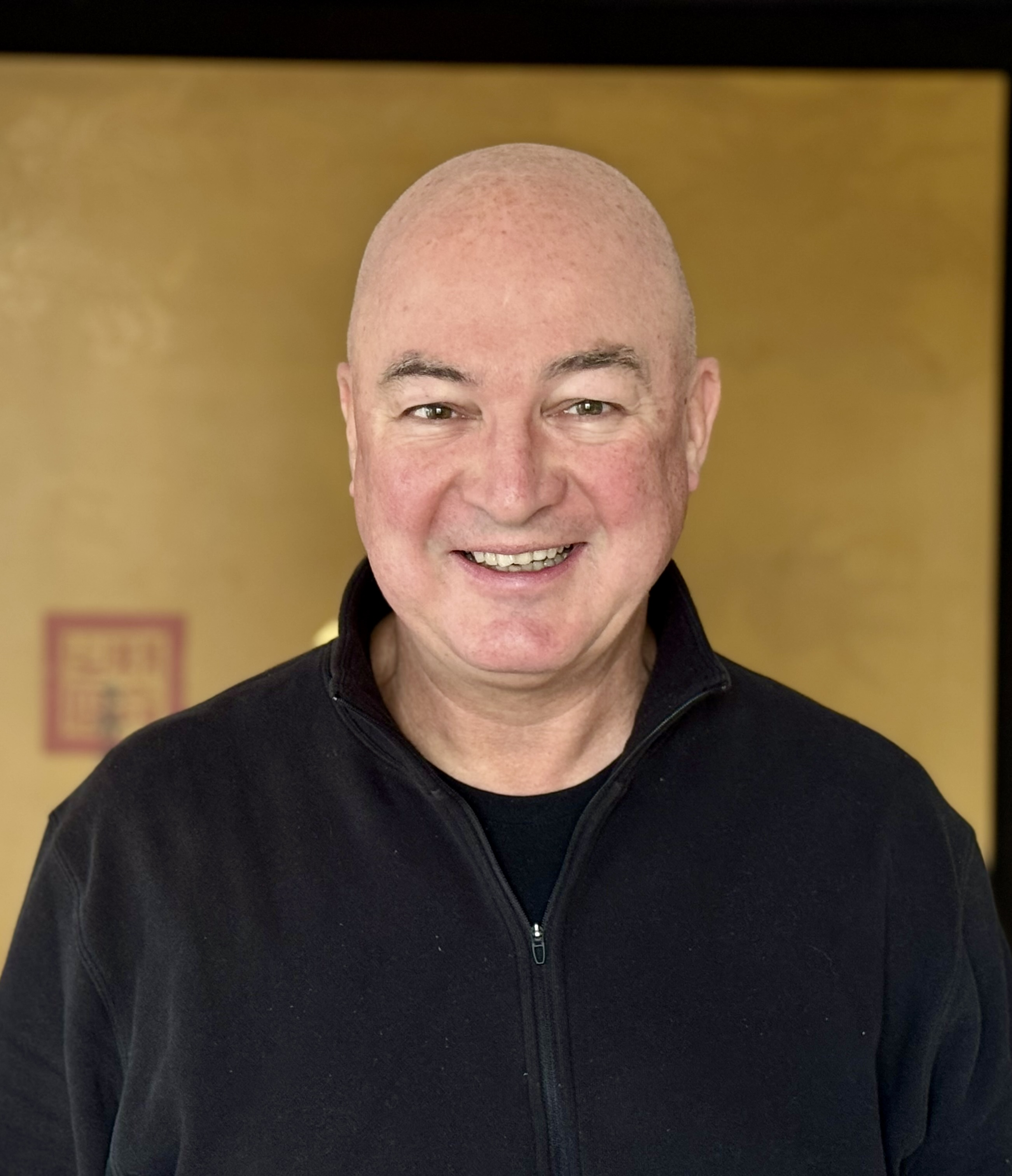
- Born: 1964 (age 61–62); Glasgow, Scotland, UK
- Occupation: Businessman
- Title: Former CEO of Unilever
- Term: 2019–2023
- Predecessor: Paul Polman
- Successor: Hein Schumacher

Alan Jope CBE (born 1964) is a British businessman. He was Chief Executive Officer (CEO) of Unilever from January 2019 until June 2023, succeeding Paul Polman. Upon stepping down as CEO of Unilever, Jope was succeeded by Hein Schumacher who took on the role from July 2023.

In the 2024 Birthday Honours, Jope was appointed a Commander of the Order of the British Empire (CBE) for services to business.

== Education ==
Jope was born in Glasgow, Scotland, in 1964. He earned a bachelor of commerce degree from the University of Edinburgh Business School. He attended Harvard Business School's general management program in 2001.

== Career ==
Jope joined Unilever in 1985 as a graduate marketing trainee. He was the president of Beauty & Personal Care, the largest division at Unilever. He has had stints running several operations including China.

From 2009, Jope led Unilever's business in China and North Asia, doubling its size and laying important foundations for future success. He was appointed to Unilever's leadership executive in 2011 in his role as president of Unilever's businesses across North Asia. Previous senior roles also included President Russia, Africa & Middle East; and President of Unilever's Beauty & Personal Care division. Earlier, Jope worked in a number of sales and marketing roles in the UK, Thailand and the US. He was appointed CEO in 2019 and worked until June 2023. Under his tenure shares gained just over 10%, recovering from a four year low.

Jope has been a trustee of the Leverhulme Trust - which gives grants and scholarships of over £120million a year across arts, sciences, social sciences and humanities - since 2021, and Chair since August 2024.

In 2023 Jope became a non-executive director at Accenture and a commissioner at the Global Commission on Modern Slavery & Human Trafficking.

He is a Visiting Fellow at the University of Oxford Saïd Business School, a guest lecturer at the Royal Society of Arts, once appeared as a guest judge, with Donald Trump, in reality TV show The Apprentice, and is Chair of the British Business Awards.

== Personal ==
Jope is married, with three children.
