= Leverhulme Trust =

British foundation

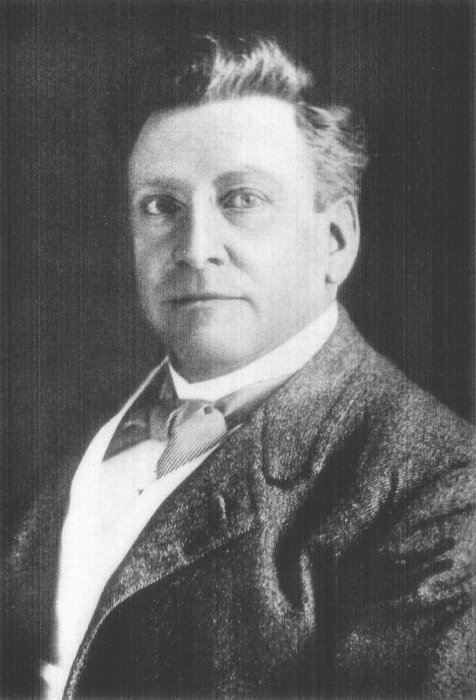
The 1st Viscount Leverhulme.

The Leverhulme Trust (/ˈliːvərhjuːm/) is a large national grant-making organisation in the United Kingdom. It was established in 1925 under the will of the 1st Viscount Leverhulme (1851–1925), with the instruction that its resources should be used to cover certain trade charities and support "scholarships for the purposes of research and education." Over time, it has come to focus on the latter aim.

The Trust is based in London and is a registered charity under English law.

The current Chair of the Trust is Alan Jope.

== Activities ==
Since its foundation in 1925, the Trust has provided funding for research projects, fellowships, studentships, bursaries and prizes. It operates across all academic disciplines with the intention of supporting individuals in research and professional training.

Dispensing over £100 million a year, the Trust is one of the largest providers of research funding in the UK.

The Trust places special weight on:

- the originality of the projects put to them;
- the significance of the proposed work;
- the ability to judge and take appropriate risk in the project;
- the removal of barriers between traditional disciplines.

== History ==
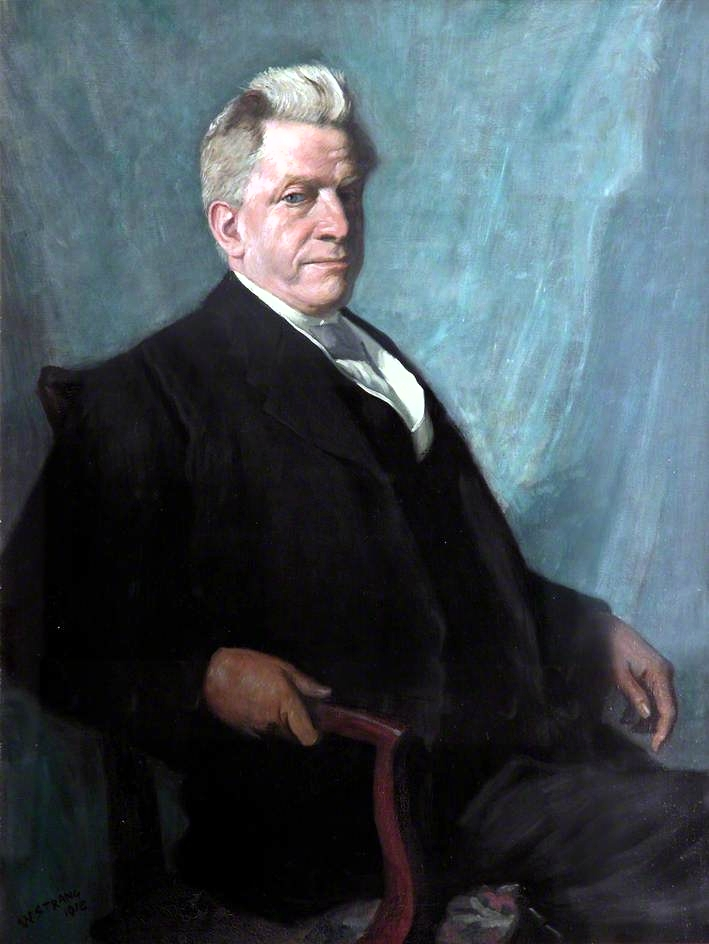
William Hesketh Lever, 1st Viscount Leverhulme (1851–1925), painting by William Strang († 1921), 1918. University of Liverpool Art Gallery and Collections.

Victorian businessman and entrepreneur William Hesketh Lever manufactured and marketed Sunlight soap. In order to produce cheap soap and undercut competition, he controlled large concessionary areas in the Congo. These were granted to him by King Leopold, with whom he was a close friend. Many Congolese were exploited for use in forced labour which was allowed to continue for many decades before coming to light.

Lever extended his business activities in ways that both served and profited from the rapid rise of a mass market for basic consumer products. He was also a philanthropist, supporting a variety of educational, religious, civic, community and medical causes. His achievements were recognised in 1922 when the title of Lord Leverhulme of the Western Isles was conferred upon him.

On his death in 1925, Lord Leverhulme left a proportion of his interest in the company he had founded, Lever Brothers, in trust for specific beneficiaries: to include first certain trade charities and secondly the provision of "scholarships for the purposes of research and education". The Leverhulme Trust was established. In the succeeding years, Lever Brothers became a cornerstone of Unilever, created in 1930 by the merger of Lever Brothers with Margarine Unie of the Netherlands. The Leverhulme Trust's shareholding thus became part of Unilever plc. November 1983 saw an evolution in the arrangements for the two charitable objectives. Subsequently, the Leverhulme Trust has been able to give concentrated attention to research and education.

== Grant schemes ==
The Trust seeks to provide mechanisms for the support of researchers and students, and currently offers the following schemes:

Research Project Grants
Provide funds to employ research staff for up to five years on an original project of high quality and potential. Choice of theme and the design of the research depend on the applicant.

Research Leadership Awards
Available every three years. They support researchers who have begun a university career and need to build a research team able to tackle an identified but distinctive research problem. Each UK institution is limited to one bid only.

Study Abroad Studentships
Support for up to two years of advanced study or research at a centre of learning in any overseas country, with the exception of the United States.

Early Career Fellowships
Provide career development opportunities of two or three years. For those who are at a relatively early stage of their academic careers but with a proven record of research.

Research Fellowships
Provide support for up to two years for experienced researchers, particularly those who have been prevented by routine duties from completing a programme of original research. Awards are not limited to those holding appointments in higher education.

International Fellowships
Open to those holding a full-time post in a UK institution of higher education or comparable institution and support a period overseas in a stimulating academic environment for up to two years.

Major Research Fellowships
Provide up to three years of full-time teaching replacement so that the applicant can concentrate on a piece of research, typically bringing it forward to publication as a monograph.

Emeritus Fellowships
Provide support for up to two years of research to be conducted by the applicant following retirement from an academic post.

Visiting Professorships
Enable distinguished academics based overseas to spend up to ten months at a UK university, primarily in order to enhance the skills of academic staff or the student body within the host institution.

Philip Leverhulme Prizes
Awarded to outstanding scholars who have made a 'substantial and recognised' contribution to their particular field of study, are recognised at an international level, and where the expectation is that they have further progress to make.

Leverhulme Doctoral Scholarships
Support doctoral studies in UK universities and nurture the future generation of young researchers. Each award funds 15 Leverhulme Doctoral Scholarships at that institution.

Arts Scholarships
Provide training opportunities across the whole range of artistic disciplines in the fine and performing arts. Arts scholarships may be in the form of: (a) bursaries to enable individuals to develop their talent, and/or; (b) innovative teaching awards to provide new and original training opportunities for the students concerned.

== See also ==
- Royal Institution Christmas Lectures
- Leverhulme Medal of the Royal Society
- Leverhulme Medal of the British Academy
- Leverhume Center for Nature Recovery (LCNR)
