= D. K. Bandyopadhyay =

Vice-chancellor of Guru Gobind Singh Indraprastha University

Dr.Dilip K. Bandyopadhyay

Present Title = Chief Advisor(FPO), Chairman Law and Eng Technology (IP) of Amity Group of Institutions Former Vice-chancellor of the Guru Gobind Singh Indraprastha University

Personal details
- Born: West Bengal
- Education: ESSEC
- Profession: Professor; Academic administrator

Dilip K. Bandyopadhyay is a professor, scientific management researcher and an academic administrator of repute. Presently he is the Chief Advisor to the office of the Founder President of Amity Group of Institutions. He was second vice-chancellor of the Guru Gobind Singh Indraprastha University. His term of the Vice-Chancellor office started on 9 December 2008 and ended on 8 December 2013. Prof. Bandyopadhyay was the director of the Indian Institute of Forest Management, Bhopal, from 2004 to 2008.

He is a fellow of ESSEC, Paris. Prior to joining to IIFM, he was a Professor (1986- 2008), Dean and Acting director (2000–2003) at the Indian Institute of Management Lucknow.
