= ESSEC Global BBA =

BBA program at ESSEC Business School

Coordinates: 49°01′59″N 2°04′40″E

ESSEC BBA
- École Supérieure des Sciences Economiques et Commerciales
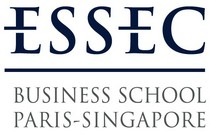
- Motto: "L'esprit pionnier"'
- Motto in English: The Pioneering Spirit
- Established: 1975
- Religious affiliation: Catholic Church
- Dean: Christina Terra
- Students: 1,600
- Location: Cergy, France; Rabat, Morocco; Singapore
- Campus: Urban
- Website: www.essec.edu/en/global-bba

The ESSEC Global BBA is the Bachelor of Business Administration program of the French institution ESSEC Business School.

It was created in 1975 by ESSEC to prepare students to meet the needs of French firms launching operations on the international market.

In 1977, the degree became the first ever undergraduate degree outside of the US to be awarded AACSB accreditation. In 2003, it became the first undergraduate degree to hold both EQUIS and AACSB accreditations.

== Academics ==
=== Curriculum ===
The curriculum is four years long and divided into two "cycles", of two years each. It allows for professional exposure and is concluded by a thesis.

==== First cycle ====
During the first two years, students take classes in subjects grouped into "modules": "Management Science and Techniques", "Marketing and International Trade Development", "Economic and Legal Environments", "Personal Development and Entrepreneurship" and "Languages". In the first year, students must spend 6 to 12 weeks interning in a position of customer service/ relations. At the end of their second year, they are required to spend at least three months interning in the company and position of their choice.

At the end of the First Cycle, students are matched with tutors who accompany them until they graduate. These tutors are volunteers, and are either Professors at ESSEC or alumni of the school.

==== Second cycle ====
Although still based on the module system, the second and final half of the BBA is more tailored to fit the needs and interests of each individual student. Three main paths are possible:

- Double-degree path: Offers two semesters in a foreign partner university, a six-month internship abroad and a final semester at ESSEC. Students receive both the ESSEC diploma and the partner school's diploma.
- Exchange path: Comprises 1 or 2 semesters in a foreign partner university, at least one semester of internship abroad (a second, optional one is possible), and a final semester at ESSEC. Credit earned in the selected foreign university will count towards the ESSEC Bachelor only.
- Sandwich education: Combines one year of professional placement and 1 year of studies, in alternating periods of 6 months, and a semester abroad. Students following this path therefore complete their education later than other students.

During the Second Cycle, students have a choice of various electives.

After original research is produced during the final months of the program, it is concluded by the defense of a senior thesis.

=== Faculty ===
Many of the Bachelor faculty members are also ESSEC MBA faculty members, and some teach at other institutions such as the Sorbonne, Université Paris-Dauphine, or Sciences Po Paris. Additionally, sixty professionals lead classes. Language teachers are all native speakers of the language they teach, and make up for 10 nationalities.

== International scope ==
Students who graduate will have spent at least 1 year abroad, including at least a semester in one of the foreign partner schools, and at least a semester of work experience abroad.

=== Partner universities ===
The ESSEC BBA has 174 partner universities in 45 countries.

Some of the most recognizable partners for exchanges are McGill University, Emory University, Keio University, Queen's University, Hong Kong University of Science and Technology, IE Business School, UNC-Chapel Hill, Bocconi Milan, and UNSW Sydney.

Seven dual-degrees are offered: Sheffield Hallam University, Hogeschool van Amsterdam, International Business School Groningen, Plekhanov Russian Academy of Economics Moscow, ESIC Madrid, Dortmund University of Applied Sciences and Arts, and Tongji University Shanghai.

=== Foreign languages ===
A total of nine different languages are taught at the ESSEC BBA.

Three languages are mandatory: they include English for all students, either German or Spanish as second languages, and a choice between Arabic, Portuguese, Russian, Italian, Chinese and Japanese as third languages. A score of 850/990 points on the TOEIC is a pre-requisite for graduation. The TOEIC is taken on campus during the second year.

The German "WIDaF" and Spanish "Bulats" tests are also taken during the 2nd year of studies, but there is no minimal score required to obtain the degree. During the third year of studies, ESSEC students take several management courses in English with international exchange students.

Some partner universities (especially those in the US and Canada) require students to obtain certain minimum scores on the TOEFL. Adequate preparation for this test is provided by ESSEC.

== Student clubs ==
From entrepreneurial to humanitarian, from cultural to sports-related, there are more than 100 student clubs at ESSEC, among which:

- Mardis de l'ESSEC: It organizes discussions with leaders in many different fields. Former participants total more than 400 people, and have included current (and former) heads-of-state and ministers, such as Nicolas Sarkozy and Jacques Chirac, and major business players, such as Serge Dassault. The first participant was Salvador Dalí, in 1961;
- Junior ESSEC Conseil: Run by ESSEC Project Managers, it provides companies with market studies, internal auditing, communication strategies evaluations, and more. Its revenue stands at €1,5 million/year, through about 250 missions per year;
- BBA ESSEC & Co'm: An association meant to promote the BBA program by organizing events such as the open door event, giving information on the program to students at conferences (Campus Chanel).
- High Five: ESSEC's Yearbook club, which organizes events, BeerPong tournaments, and a variety of different activities.
- Reve FM: The school's radio;
- ESSEClive: ESSEC's community website, the first student website in France (by number of visits);
- Melt: It organizes various activities for international students throughout the year;
- Foyer des élèves (Foy's): Founded in 1973, the Foy's is a student-run pub located at the Cergy-Pontoise campus. It serves ESSEC students from noon to midnight, offering sandwiches for lunch and drinks all day long. In addition to every day operations, the "Foy's" also organizes many concerts, events, and themed parties.

=== Statistics ===
- International placement

After graduation, 65% of alumni work abroad or in an international context, and 45% work in a position requiring three languages.

- Further studies

60% continue their studies, of which 12% choose to join an MBA.

Of all BBA students who apply for a Specialized Master program at ESSEC, 70% are admitted. Students may also apply to enter the ESSEC MSc in Management program.

ESSEC BBA students seeking postgraduate education outside ESSEC have historically joined French schools such as INSEAD, Université Paris-Dauphine, EM Lyon, Sciences-Po, or the Ecole des Mines de Paris, and foreign schools like the London School of Economics, the Bocconi Milan, Stanford University, the London Business School, or McGill University.

== Rankings ==
Among French undergraduate business programs, the ESSEC BBA was ranked:

- 1st by L'Etudiant in 2022;
- 1st by L'Obs in 2021;
- 1st by Challenges in 2023;
- 1st by Le Point in 2023;
- 1st by Le Figaro in 2023

== Admissions ==
In 2023, the acceptance rate of the French-language track in Cergy was approximately 10.3% (847 students admitted out of 8,234 applicants), while the acceptance rate of the English-language track in Cergy was approximately 6.3% (382 from 6,018 applicants). That same year, the Singapore campus had an acceptance rate around 11.2% (390 students from 3,490 applicants), while the Rabat campus accepted approximately 15.8% of students (414 out of 2,616).

The admission process is primarily carried out right out of secondary school. Admissions to the ESSEC BBA program are made through the competitive Concours SESAME, an examination common to 7 different French business schools.

A written examination evaluates language skills, logic (quantitative and general), and capacity for analysis during an 8-hour session. If the candidate is successful, (s)he then has to pass a series of graded interviews conducted at the school (conversations in the chosen foreign languages, and a general interview).

It is also possible to join the BBA later on in one's studies, as a transfer student, although this is much rarer.

== Notable alumni ==
The Bachelor's is part of the ESSEC Business School network, which includes 62,000 alumni.

== Notes ==
Most of the information on this page is found on the , and on the brochure, downloadable on the website.
