= University of Paris-Seine =

Coordinates: 48.5000°N 2.5000°E

- Université Paris-Seine
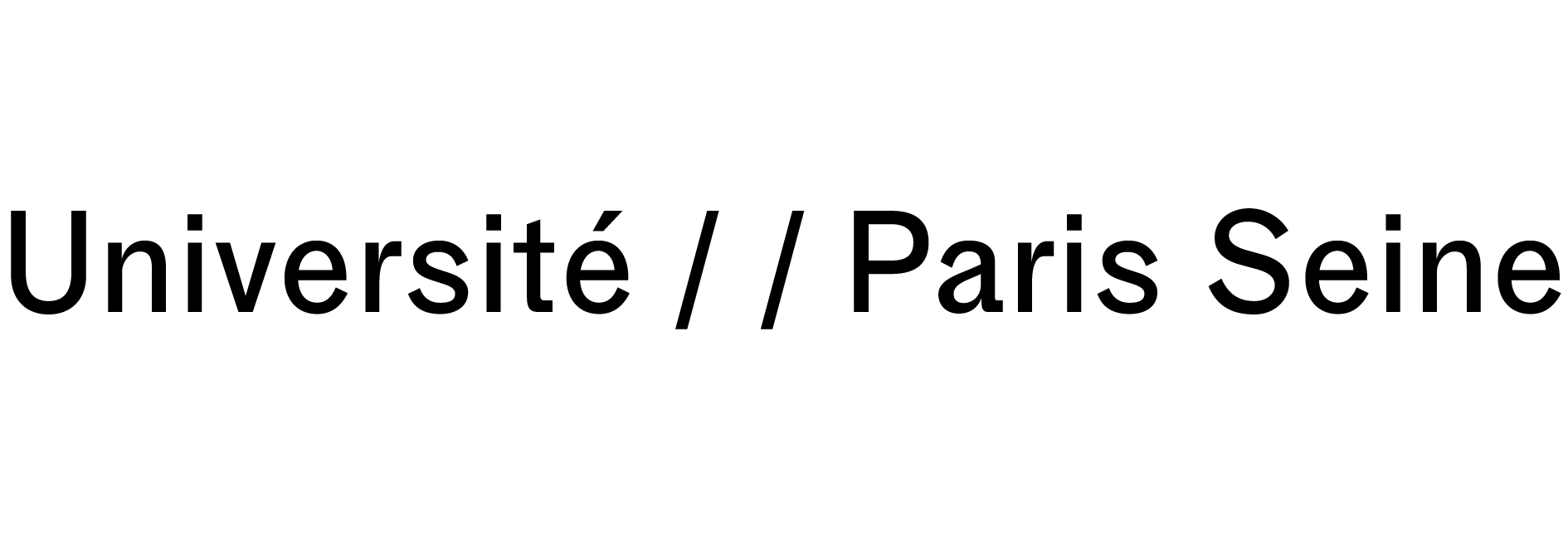
- Type: Public
- Active: 6th of February 2012–1st of January 2020
- President: Anne-Sophie Barthez
- Location: Île-de-France, France
- Nickname: UPS
- Website: http://www.universiteparisseine.fr

University of Paris-Seine was an association of universities and higher education institutions (ComUE) located in the region of Paris, France. Member institutes include National School of Arts (Paris-Cergy), National School of Architecture (Versailles), National School of Landscaping, ESSEC Business School and University of Cergy-Pontoise among others. Started as the Paris-Seine initiative, it was renamed to University of Paris-Seine in 2015 according to the 2013 Law on Higher Education and Research (France).

== History ==
The association original formed as one of the Pôle de recherche et d'enseignement supérieur (PRES) in France, organizing universities and research institutions from West of Île-de-France, covering nearly the whole spectrum of sciences (fundamental, engineering, business). As a PRES, the association was named "Université du grand ouest parisien" and was officially created the 6th of February 2012, in the form of a établissement public de coopération scientifique (EPCS). It has been renamed « Université Paris-Seine » the 1st of March 2015.

== Members ==
The members of the University of Paris-Seine as of the 2015 statute are:

- Cergy-Pontoise University - UCP;
- CY Tech, formerly École internationale des sciences du traitement de l'information - EISTI;
- ESSEC Business School - ESSEC;
- ISIPCA (Institut supérieur international du parfum, de la cosmétique et de l'aromatique alimentaire)
- École nationale supérieure d’architecture de Versailles - ENSA-V;
- École nationale supérieure du paysage - ENSP-V;
- École nationale supérieure d'arts de Paris-Cergy - ENSAPC;
- École nationale supérieure de l'électronique et de ses applications (ENSEA);
- Supméca (Institut Supérieur de Mécanique) );
- École de Biologie Industrielle - EBI;
- École d'électricité, de production et des méthodes industrielles - ECAM-EPMI;
- Institut libre d'éducation physique supérieur - ILEPS;
- École supérieure d'Informatique, réseaux et systèmes d'information - ITESCIA;
- École pratique de service social - EPSS;
- École d'ingénieur d'agro-développement international - ISTOM.
