= Dominique Reiniche =

French businesswoman (born 1955)

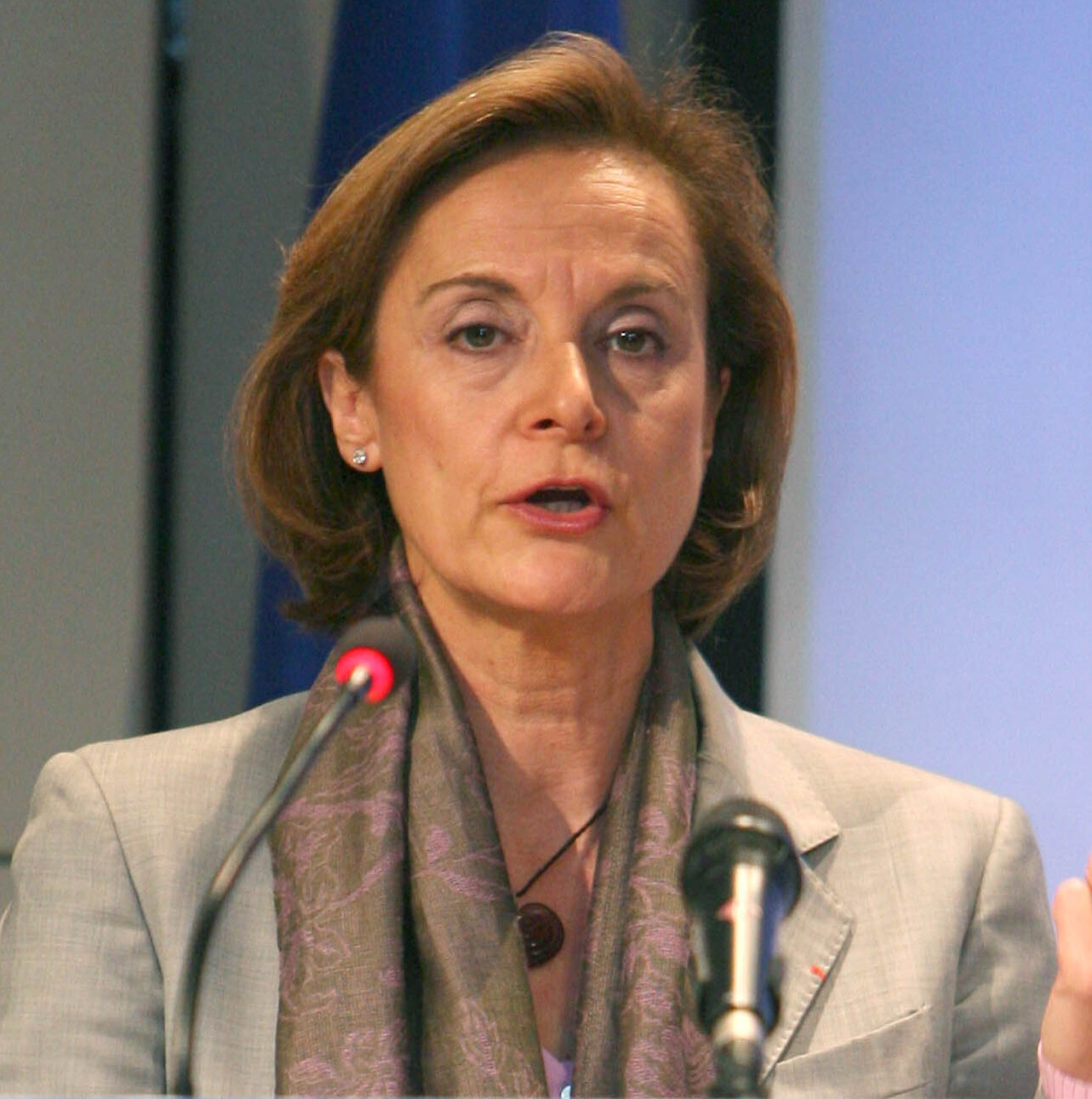
- Dominique Reiniche in 2006
- Born: 13 July 1955 (age 71); Lyon, France
- Education: ESSEC Business School
- Occupation: Businesswoman
- Known for: Chairman Europe of The Coca-Cola Company

Dominique Reiniche (born 13 July 1955 in Lyon) is a French businesswoman. She has been Chairman Europe of The Coca-Cola Company since January 2013. She was previously president of Coca-Cola Europe, overseeing for 28 countries in the European economic zone, and she has been ranked several times among the 50 most influential women in the world. She is also member of the board of directors of AXA, a member of the advisory board of ING, and president of UNESDA. In July 2019, Reiniche was appointed chair of Eurostar.

Reiniche has a daughter and two stepdaughters.

== Coca-Cola ==
Reiniche holds an MBA from the ESSEC Business School in Paris. Based in Paris, she is Chairman Europe of The Coca-Cola Company, a title she has held since January 2013. In May 2005, she was appointed President of the Europe Group, overseeing Coca-Cola's European market, which comprises 38 countries including both members of the European Union and of the European economic zone, therefore being responsible for 60,000 employees and one third of Coca-Cola's global sales, a total of $6.8 billion in 2005.

As a spokesperson for Coca-Cola, she has advocated for the group's interests to European institutions on subjects such as balanced diets, self-regulation in advertising, and healthy exercise practices. Dominique Reiniche is also an activist on behalf of equal opportunity and gender equality.

Reiniche began her career at Coca-Cola in 1992 and continued to obtain positions with increasing responsibility: starting out in marketing and sales, she rose to the number 2 position in the company when she became its general director.

== Other positions ==
She began her career with Procter & Gamble, for whom she worked for eight years. She rose to Director of Marketing and Strategy for Kraft Jacobs Suchard before joining The Coca-Cola Company. She was appointed General Manager, France, in 1998 and President of Coca-Cola Europe in 2003, succeeding Shaun Higgins. She was the first woman to lead Coca-Cola Enterprises Europe.

From May 2005 to May 2007, Dominique Reiniche was President of UNESDA (the Union of European Soft Drinks Associations). During her term, she fought to forge ties between the soft drink industry and European institutions by encouraging industry professionals to communicate more broadly on the range of refreshments they offer and pushing them to adopt new legislation regulating marketing targeted at children. She was also the President of the UDA (Advertiser's Union), member of the MEDEF Board of Directors (1998-2006), and member of ING Direct's Advisory Board.

Reiniche was also a member of the Board of Directors of Essilor (until August 1, 2006), ECR Europe until April 2012 (Industry-Supermarket distribution Forum), and the CIAA (Confederation of the Food and Drink Industries of the EU), which became Food Drink Europe in July 2012. As part of this role, she belonged to the spearhead committee that put in place a new voluntary system of labeling nutritional information that is applicable to the entire European food and drink industry.

She is currently President of UNESDA. She is also an administrator of Axa's Board of Directors and a member of PSA-Peugeot's advisory board.

== Honors and awards ==
Reiniche has consistently been classified as one of Fortune Magazine's Top 50 most powerful women in business since 2003. She went from 40th place in 2006 to 16th place in 2012, becoming the first French woman to reach such a high ranking. She also figures among the 10 most influential European Women according to The Financial Times.
