= Hoa Sen University =

Private university in Ho Chi Minh City, Vietnam

Coordinates: 10.7724°N 106.6793°E

- Đại học Hoa Sen
- Motto: Tôn trọng sự khác biệt
- Motto in English: Respect Diversity
- Type: Private
- Established: 1991; 35 years ago
- President: Assoc. Prof. Dr. Nguyen Huu Huy Nhut
- Vice-Chancellor: Dr. Le Van Ut, Assoc. Prof. Dr. Nguyen Tuan Duc, Mrs. Tran Thị Dieu Huyen
- Location: 8 Nguyễn Văn Tráng, Bến Thành, Ho Chi Minh City, Vietnam
- Website: www.hoasen.edu.vn
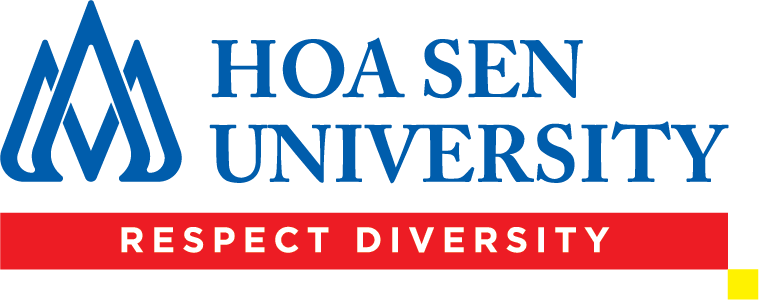

Hoa Sen University (Vietnamese: Đại học Hoa Sen, lit. 'Lotus University') is a private university in Ho Chi Minh City, Vietnam. The predecessor of this university was Hoa Sen College.

== History ==
The predecessor of Hoa Sen College was the School of Foreign Languages and Information Technology, which was established under the Decision 257/QĐ-UB dated August 12, 1991 by the Chairman of Ho Chi Minh City People Committee (the mayor). The school has been supported by Lotus Association in France. On October 11, 1994, the school was turned into a semi-private school. In 2001, the school inaugurated its second campus in Quang Trung Software Park, Ho Chi Minh City. In 2005, the school was officially upgraded to become Hoa Sen University.

On November 30, 2006, the Vietnamese prime minister signed a decision to establish Hoa Sen University on the base of Hoa Sen College. One of the university's founding principles was a not-for-profit orientation that focused on reinvestment in education activities - one of the first and only educational institution to do so in Vietnam.

On January 12, 2016, Hoa Sen University (HSU) became the first university at Vietnam were accredited by ACBSP.

In 2018, HSU became a member of Nguyen Hoang Group (NHG) which is the university system of educational corporations.

In 2019, 7 programs achieved international accreditation standards, including 5 ACBSP programs & 2 AUN-QA programs.

In 2020, HSU achieved national quality accreditation standards.

In 2021, HSU achieved 4-star QS-Stars standard, 10 programs achieved international accreditation standards, including ACBSP & 5 AUN-QA programs.

In 2022, HSU accredited for the International English Communication Program by the National Education Assessment System of Australia - NEAS. 17 programs meet international standards, 5 programs have achieved ACBSP accreditation, 8 programs have achieved AUN-QA standards, and 3 programs have achieved FIBAA accreditation.

== Faculties ==
- Faculty of Information and Technology
- Faculty of Design and Art
- Faculty of Finance and Banking
- Faculty of Tourism
- Faculty of Logistics and International Trade
- Faculty of Languages and International Cultures
- Faculty of Social Sciences - Law
- Faculty of Economics and Management

== International academic partners ==
- NIIT, (NIIT Technologies), Mumbai, India
- ITIN, (IT Institute), Cergy, France
- UBI, Brussels, Belgium
- ESCIA, Pontoise, France
- University of the South, Toulon-Var, Toulon, France
- De Montfort University, Leicester, England
