= Treaties of Nijmegen Medal =

Biannual prize given to key international figures committed to European development

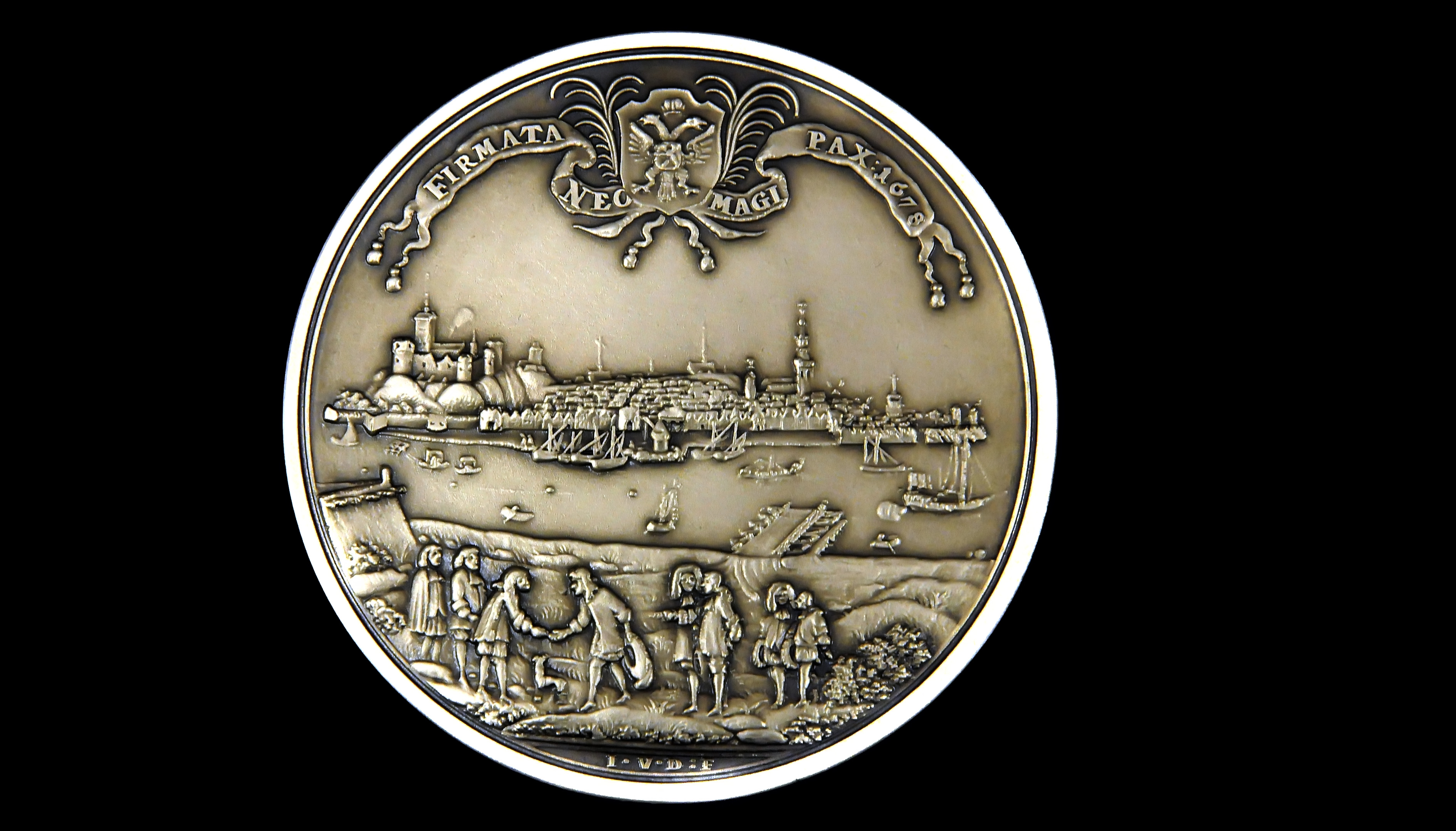
Treaties of Nijmegen Medal, Jacob van Dishoecke, 1678

The Treaties of Nijmegen Medal (Dutch: Vrede van Nijmegen Penning) is a biannual prize that is awarded to "key international figures committed to European development".

The Treaties of Nijmegen Medal is an initiative by the municipality of Nijmegen, Radboud University Nijmegen and NXP Semiconductors N.V., and is supported by the Ministry of Foreign Affairs.

== Winners ==
=== 2010: France – Jacques Delors ===
Jacques Delors was the first laureate to receive the Treaties of Nijmegen Medal. The former chairman of the European Commission (1985–1995) was awarded the medal for his efforts in achieving European unity.

Jacques Delors strove to remove European national borders, as he believed economic integration would pave the way for European unity. Delors not only focused on the economic dimensions of European unity, but also on the social cohesion of Europe and the promotion of solidarity between the richer and poorer areas of Europe.

But perhaps Delors played his most important role right after the fall of the Berlin Wall on 9 November 1989. He succeeded in turning German and French interests into European interests. He then prepared the Maastricht Treaty (1991), which contained a resolution on the introduction of the Euro and agreements regarding a common foreign policy administered by the European Council.

=== 2012: Italy – Umberto Eco ===
On 7 May 2012, the Treaties of Nijmegen Medal was presented to Umberto Eco. The award served as a tribute to the Italian author and scientist for his contribution to the thinking and the debate on the past and future of Europe. Umberto Eco's contribution consists of influential literary works which were published in almost every European language, and in which he searched for a single European language.

In his contribution to the project 'Old Europe, New Europe, Core Europe', Umberto Eco argued that the unification of Europe is inevitable. In his speech, Mayor Dijkstra called Umberto Eco 'a true European', while Minister of European Affairs Ben Knapen singled out Umberto Eco in his laudatory speech as 'a source of hope – hope for the future of a united and prosperous Europe'.

=== 2014: Netherlands – Neelie Kroes ===
On 7 May 2014 the Treaties of Nijmegen Medal was awarded to Neelie Kroes in recognition of her contributions to the development and prosperity of Europe.

== History ==
=== Painting Henri Gascard ===
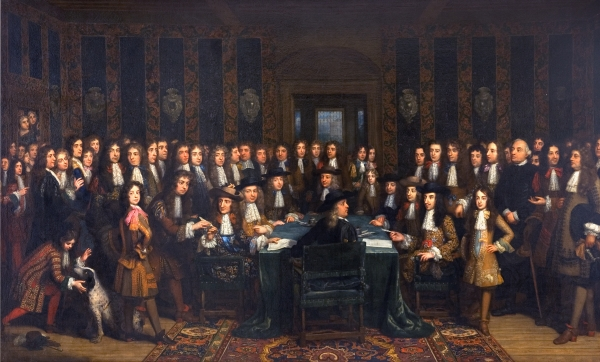
Treaties of Nijmegen: The signing of the peace treaty between France and Spain by Henri Gascard (1635–1701)

This painting by the French court painter Gascard shows one of the first treaties, that of 17 September 1678 between France and Spain. In this treaty, it was agreed that Spain would definitively distance itself from important border towns in the southern Netherlands and Northern France acquired its present form.

The location is the "groote audientie Camer" [the great audience room] in former palace Huis Palsterkamp on the Doddendaal, the embassy building of the States General in Nijmegen. Through the window, a glimpse of the nearby Kronenburg tower can be seen. The walls of this distinguished room are covered with tapestries which conceal several windows and a fireplace. This gave the room a sense of symmetrical balance so that neither party could claim to be sitting in the most important place. Such a signing ceremony was a precarious occasion and nothing could be left to chance. A big table in the centre, with two well dressed gentlemen at either end. These are the Dutchmen Van Beverningk and Van Haren, who had mediated between the conflicting parties and who resided in Huis Palsterkamp. On the left is a richly dressed man picking up a goose quill to sign the treaty. This is the elderly French Marshal d'Estrades, the highest envoy of Louis XIV, the Sun King. Opposite him is the Spanish envoy, De los Balbases, with his goose quill already in his hand. Beside him is his little son, hand placed elegantly on his side, and behind him a Spanish chaplain. The other envoys surround them. The French delegation on the left is bigger because it was the French King Louis who commissioned the painting. Seventy people feature in the painting.

Henri Gascar began painting portraits at an early age in his native France, later moving on to Italy and England. He acquired fame as a skilled portrait painter of fashionable courtesans in decadent costumes. In April 1679, more than six months after the treaty was ratified, he was sent to Nijmegen at the behest of King Louis XIV to paint the peace conference. He never witnessed the signing of the treaty. To visualise the events, he was given a fairly detailed description and paid several visits to both the hall and all of the individuals present that day. He also took this opportunity to paint individual portraits of several ambassadors. Upon his return in November 1679, he was given permission to travel by sea from Rotterdam to France via Antwerp with two large chests: one with the group portrait of the ambassadors ('our' portrait) and one with the individual portraits.

=== Medal ===
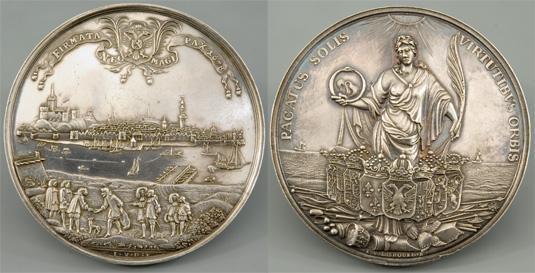
Jacob van Dishoecke (died around 1710) Peace of Nijmegen, 1678, Valkhof Museum

To commemorate the Treaties of Nijmegen, many medals and coins were made, sometimes from very expensive material. These were mainly French medallists who portrayed the peace of Nijmegen, but there were also Dutch craftsmen. Jacob van Dishoecke is the most distinguished of these artists. This silver medal is a beautiful example of his work and was specially made to commemorate the peace treaties signed in Nijmegen. The medal features a panorama of the city of Nijmegen with various negotiators in the foreground. At the top are the city arms on a banderole, with the words: FIRMATA NEOMAGI PAX 1678 (peace signed in Nijmegen 1678).

The replica of this medal is awarded to people of exceptional merit for Europe as the Treaties of Nijmegen Medal. This medal was awarded to Jacques Delors in 2010, to Umberto Eco in 2012 and was presented to Neelie Kroes in 2014.
