= ESSEC Business School =

Business school based in Cergy, France

Coordinates: 49°01′59″N 2°04′40″E

- École Supérieure des Sciences Economiques et Commerciales
- ESSEC Business School
- Motto: Per scientiam ad libertatem Enlighten. Lead. Change.
- Type: Grande école de commerce et de management (Private research university Business school)
- Established: 1907; 119 years ago
- Accreditation: Triple accreditation: AACSB; AMBA; EQUIS
- Academic affiliations: Conférence des Grandes écoles; CY Cergy Paris University
- President: Vincenzo Esposito Vinzi
- Faculty: 193 (January 2026); 100% PhD.; 36% female; 58% international
- Students: 7,800 (January 2026)
- Location: Paris, France; Queenstown, Singapore; Rabat, Morocco
- Language: English-only & French-only instruction
- Colors: White and Black
- Website: www.essec.edu

ESSEC Business School (French: École supérieure des sciences économiques et commerciales. English translation: Graduate School of Economic and Commercial Sciences) is a French business school and Grande école. Its main campus is located in Cergy, with additional campuses in Paris, Rabat, and Singapore.

Founded by Jesuits in 1907, ESSEC was created as a response to the opening of HEC Paris. It operated independently until 1981, when it came under the governance of the Versailles Chamber of Commerce, which later became part of the Chamber of Commerce and Industry of Paris Île-de-France in 2013. ESSEC is currently a member of the CY Alliance (formerly Université Paris-Seine), a group of academic institutions in the Paris region.

== History ==
=== Foundation (1907–1913) ===
ESSEC was established in 1907 under the Economic Institute by Ferdinand Le Pelletier in Paris. Its creation followed the movement of other private business schools established under Catholic guardianship in the early 20th century, such as HEC Nord (which later became EDHEC) by the Catholic Institute of Lille, and ESSCA by the Catholic Institute of Angers.

The establishment of the Falloux Laws in 1854 allowed the development of religious secondary education. Following the Dreyfus affair (1895) and the law of separation of church and state (1905), the Church sought to regain influence, in particular by disseminating its moral values in the economic sphere and by educating in the field of business.

ESSEC was founded within a broader movement of Catholic higher education institutions established in France in the early 20th century. This followed legislative changes affecting religious education, especially between Jesuits and the secular and Republican ideology of the state. The stated aim of the new institution was to "train leaders for a commercial and economic career, which requires competent men, imbued with Christian and human values". The school was located at the École Sainte Geneviève (created by Jesuits in 1854) in the Latin Quarter. The first class had seven students, and studies lasted two years; in 1909, an optional third year was introduced.

The original course was structured around general subjects, including law, accounting, languages, and techniques. With the introduction of Christian moral values, students attended a weekly apologetics conference in the chapel of the École Sainte Geneviève. Scientific education (physics, chemistry, and factory visits) complemented technical education (calligraphy, shorthand, and drafting of commercial documents).

=== 1913–1940 ===
Following the 1905 law on the separation of church and state, the school's premises were confiscated in 1913, and ESSEC was absorbed into the Catholic Institute of Paris (ICP). As a consequence, the school's resources were significantly reduced; for example, it had only one Amphitheatre borrowed from the ICP, and the elementary section was removed. During this period, the curriculum included languages, history of trade, commercial geography, political economy, law, and accounting, with a strong emphasis on languages totaling ten hours per week.

The school struggled during the First World War. In 1914, it had only four first‑year students and two second‑year students, and was temporarily closed before reopening in 1915. The optional third year was removed, and the school did not regain financial stability until 1920 when more than 50 students enrolled in the first year. In 1923, the Students' Association was created with a solidarity fund for war widows and orphans. In 1926, the first alumni directory was published, and three years later, the first courses in business ethics were introduced. By 1930, enrollment had increased to 150.

During the Great Depression in the 1930s, ESSEC reduced the price of tuition to attract students who preferred public service or law studies. As the school's finances worsened, it accepted high‑school graduates, uncertified examiners, and freelance auditors who took non‑certificated courses.

In 1932, the Student Office was created and in 1937, the first scholarships were awarded, marking the start of a social assistance policy.

=== 1940–1960 ===
In 1939, the Dean, Camille Donjon, reformed the curriculum and introduced entry examinations. A preparatory class for the examinations was set up in 1941.

During this period, ESSEC declined to join the unified system of écoles de commerce established by the decree of 3 December 1947, which formalized state support for preparatory classes. While HEC and ESCP joined the unified system, ESSEC positioned itself as a challenger and retained its own preparatory classes. To keep pace with its competitors, ESSEC increased the duration of study from two to three years in 1947. This continued until 1951, when ESSEC stopped offering its own preparatory classes and opened its examinations to candidates from public preparatory classes. In 1950, a three‑month compulsory end‑of‑study internship was added.

=== 1960–1970 ===
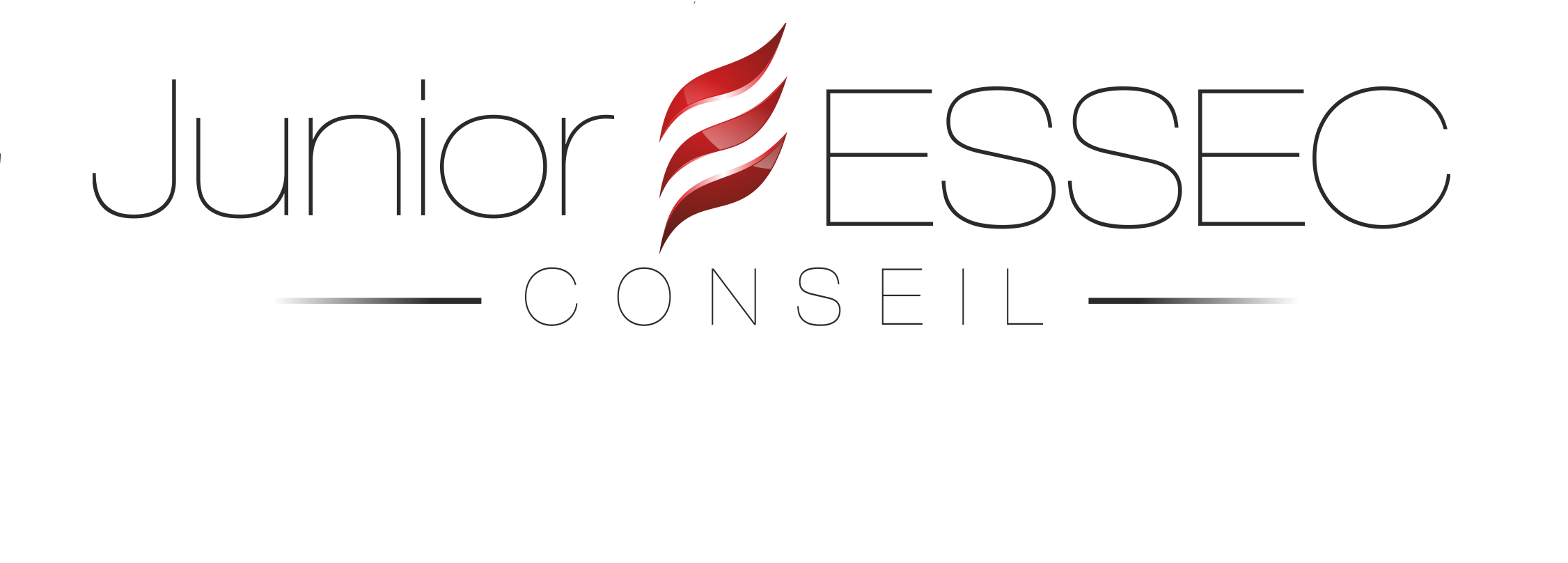
Junior ESSEC Conseil logo

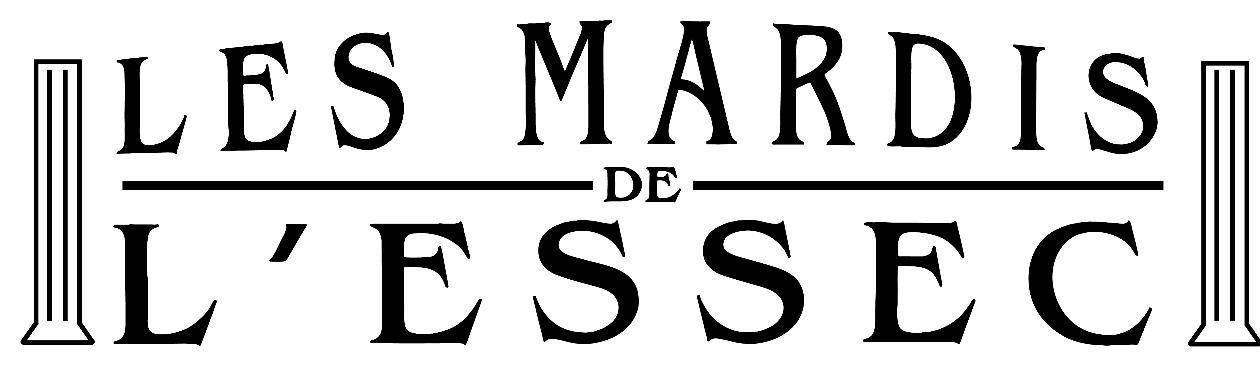
Les Mardis de l'ESSEC logo

In 1960, Gilbert Olivier succeeded Camille Donjon as dean of ESSEC. His arrival, alongside competitive pressures, affected the school's Christian identity. He started a reform process by surveying students about course content and pedagogy. The survey indicated that only a minority of students were satisfied, and teaching was described as "scholarly, serious, and lacking in openness".

In response, gradual reforms were introduced. Technical subjects such as chemistry and physics were dropped, course content was adapted to private‑sector needs, and courses in sociology and human resources were added, followed by marketing in 1965. Teaching methods were diversified with conferences and formats similar to those at HEC Paris and Sciences Po, and ESSEC adopted practices commonly used in U.S. business schools. Recruitment was broadened with the introduction of admission sur titre in 1966, which also marked the formal inclusion of women, although preparatory classes remained closed to them.

Student associations also expanded in the early 1960s with the creation of "ESSEC Tuesdays" in 1961 and the Junior Enterprise in 1967. ESSEC Tuesdays is a student forum that periodically invites speakers from the arts, sports, politics, and economics, and hosts debates led by two students from the association.

The entrance examination was revised in 1969, eliminating chemistry and physics tests and updating the oral examination to assess candidates' logical reasoning rather than general knowledge. Psychometric tests and personality interviews were also introduced. Olivier also sought to reform the preparatory program to look more like commercial education, but abandoned the effort due to opposition from HEC and other business schools.

=== 1970–1990 ===
Cergy-Pontoise is located within the Val-d'Oise department

With these reforms in place, the number of students grew, straining the school's facilities. The school occupied three amphitheaters at the ICP. In 1965, a commission was set up to consider moving the school to a new location. Projects were planned in Bagneux, Hauts-de-Seine or Gentilly, which were ultimately abandoned. On 5 July 1967, a decision was taken by ESSEC to move to a new site in the town of Cergy-Pontoise, where the current campus is located. In 1971, administrative services were moved to Raspail Boulevard.

During this time, ESSEC separated from the ICP. In 1968, the latter recognized the financial and administrative independence of the school. In 1969, the ESSEC group was founded, consisting of the school, CERESSEC, a research center, and ISSEC (an institute for executives). ICP retained one-third of the seats on the board of directors, and the appointment of the school director still had to be approved by the ICP rector.

The move to Cergy-Pontoise polarized the community. It was less well received by students due to the lack of public transportation to the area. Some teachers opposed the move, fearing a potential replacement of faculty members. The new school extended and included a large amphitheater with 300 seats, eight small 80-seat amphitheaters equipped with closed circuit television, a computer center, a large language laboratory, a library, a sports hall, a restaurant and 48 classrooms. Its reception areas (foyers, cafeterias, and a chapel) were to be available to the public in Cergy. Student housing was made available nearby.

Before 1971, ESSEC relied mainly on executives working in companies as its teaching staff. However, the school started to set up its permanent faculty. Grants awarded by FNEGE to finance studies of young professors or executives in the United States who wished to return to teaching to fill the French "management gap" allowed ESSEC to build a pool of qualified teachers. In 1972, nine out of twenty professors were former ESSEC students who had completed their training in the United States. The arrival of FNEGE Fellows, who had returned from the United States, stimulated a curriculum reform. A core curriculum was set up in the first year based on fundamentals while an à la carte curriculum was introduced from the second year and is still in effect today. The minimum internship length was raised to 12 months. Application numbers grew from 700 candidates in 1960 to 2,800 in 1973.

The decision to move to Cergy without the support of public funds resulted in heavy debt to the Caisse d'Epargne, ANFESP (the National Association for the Financing of Private School Equipment), and the Council General of Val d'Oise. This resulted in an obligation to repay up to 4-5 million francs yearly. This payment represented 11.7% of the ESSEC budget in 1975 (compared to 5% for INSEAD). The operating budget expanded from six million francs in 1972 to twenty-eight million in 1979. At one point, tuition fees increased until they doubled those of HEC. In 1979, the financial crisis erupted, exacerbated by an environment of high interest rates and an economic slowdown related to the oil shock, and the school hit a deficit of 10.4 million francs that year. Funding was provided through the apprenticeship tax, the introduction of continuing education, and parent contributions. Other solutions considered included ESSEC's nationalization or joining a larger university.

Dean Gilbert Olivier strongly opposed these options, seeing them as a failure of the initial project of the school to emancipate itself from the higher education system. Financial conditions ultimately improved, permitting the school to operate without taking such actions. The rescue was aided by the Versailles Chamber of Commerce, which injected 10 million francs to cover the deficit of ESSEC, bought 51% of ESSEC's ownership for 12 million francs and committed to pay an annual subsidy of 6 million francs from 1982 to 1989. In exchange, ESSEC retained its legal autonomy (and did not become a part of the Paris Chamber of Commerce like HEC Paris and ESCP), but had a governance system with a management board and supervisory board. This intrusion of supervision and the absence of representation of the students and professors in the general assembly triggered strikes and the launching of petitions against the plan. The agreement was finally signed on 6 April 1981. The fear of control of the school and its pedagogy ultimately proved unfounded.

=== 2000–present ===
In 1999, the school decided to rename the Grande Ecole program as an MBA, an Anglo-Saxon standard reserved for executives with many years of experience. ESSEC intended to highlight its accreditation from the AACSB (American accreditation body) and the mandatory 18 months of internships for its students. The move was followed by other business schools, such as ICN Nancy and ESC Grenoble. ESSEC then reviewed its international agreements to bring the program to the MBA or Master's level.

The renaming of the Grande École program generated debate within French business education circles and among peer institutions. Following this period, ESSEC clarified its degree structure, ultimately designating the program as a Master in Management (MiM), in line with international standards., EM Lyon and Université Paris-Dauphine, so much so that Ali Laïdi in his book" Secrets of the Economic War" (2004) said that HEC Paris would have mounted a destabilization operation toward ESSEC by attacking its MBA position. The case led to the opening of an investigation and resolution by the Paris Chamber of Commerce.

In 2005, ESSEC expanded its campus with the inauguration of the Nautile building and further, in 2007, with the multipurpose room, the Dome, which has a capacity of 2,700 people, and the Galion. The buildings were designed by Marc Seifert, son of Ivan Seifert who designed the original campus in 1973. In 2008, the library was expanded. Renovation of the restaurant area followed the following year.

In March 2006, ESSEC Business School inaugurated its new campus in Singapore within the National Library, the ESSEC Asian Center.

In 2010, ESSEC presented its plan for 2010–2015. The program portfolio was repositioned: the EPSCI (post-baccalaureate program) became the bachelor of ESSEC, and the name of MBA was abandoned and replaced with MSc in Management. The group's communication was unified under the name ESSEC Business School. A fundraising strategy of 150 million euros was announced. The school also aimed to be one of the 20 best Business Schools in the world, to join the 10 best schools in Asia and to make it into the top 5 in Europe. The decision to exclude the MBA name from its Grand Ecole program was a strategic setback for the school. As a result, this program disappeared from the Financial Times's rankings of both Masters in Management and MBA because of its hybrid nature. The dean of the time, Pierre Tapie, however, did not regret this decision, because he believed that the school had gained a reputation. In fact, in 2007, the Wall Street Journal ranked ESSEC's Grande École program 7th in the world, ahead of HEC and INSEAD.

During this time, the school expanded its double-degree agreements with the Indian Institute of Management Ahmedabad in 2006, Centrale Paris, University of Keio in 2009, École du Louvre, ENSAE and Saint-Cyr in 2010, ENS in 2011, University of Queensland, three South Korean institutions in 2014 and Bocconi University in 2015.

In 2014, Jean-Michel Blanquer, the new dean of the school, announced the plan "ESSEC 3I 2020" (Internationalisation, Innovation and Involvement). The internationalisation went through, a new ESSEC Asia-Pacific campus was established, which opened in 2015, an ESSEC Africa campus was opened in 2017, collaboration through an alliance with CentraleSupélec and involvement of students to create their own courses and mentorship programs, among other things. The school also launched its first MOOCs, inaugurated its startup incubator, ESSEC Ventures and established an experimental research laboratory, K-Lab.

== Academics ==
ESSEC Business School is a grande école, a French institution of higher education that operates independently from, but in parallel with, the main framework of the French public university system. Grandes écoles are selective academic institutions that admit students through a competitive process, and many of their graduates occupy prominent positions in French society. Similar to the Ivy League in the United States, Oxbridge in the United Kingdom, and the C9 League in China, graduation from a grande école is often considered a key credential for positions in government, administration, and the corporate sector in France.

The degrees offered are accredited by the Conférence des Grandes Écoles and awarded by the French Ministry of National Education. Higher education business degrees in France are organised into three levels to facilitate international mobility: licence/bachelor's degrees, master's degrees, and doctorates; the bachelor's and master's programmes are organised into semesters—six for the bachelor's and four for the master's. These programmes include various parcours (paths) based on unités d'enseignement (UE, modules), each carrying a defined number of European Credit Transfer and Accumulation System (ECTS) credits, which are generally transferable; a bachelor's degree is awarded upon completion of 180 ECTS credits (bac+3), and a master's degree upon completion of an additional 120 ECTS credits (bac+5). The Programme Grande École (PGE) concludes with the awarding of a Master in Management (MiM) degree.

ESSEC is often mentioned alongside HEC Paris and ESCP Business School in discussions of French business education, reflecting its longstanding presence in national and international rankings and commentary.

== Research ==
=== Departments ===
The school has eight research departments in different fields of human sciences: Accounting and Management Control; Business Law and Environment; Economy; Finance; Management; Operations Management; Marketing; Information Systems, Decision Sciences and Statistics.

=== CERESSEC ===
The ESSEC Research Center, or Centre de recherche ESSEC business school (CERESSEC), was founded in 1969. Initially evaluated by AERES from 2013, it is now accredited by HCERES, which most recently renewed its accreditation in 2024. The research focuses on scientific area in partnership with the Ministry of Higher Education and Research.[32]

According to the HCERES report on 13 May 2019, CERESSEC is "a leading research laboratory at the national and international level, it is a leading French centre in the field of management and related disciplines." Following its 2024 HCERES accreditation, CERESSEC continues to uphold its reputation for academic excellence and innovation.

The research centre brings together 171 professors, across its campuses in Cergy (France) and Singapore. Their work spans nine key research themes: Accounting and Management Control; Economics; Finance; Information Systems; Law, Negotiation, and Consultation; Management; Marketing; Operations Management; and Data Analytics.

=== ESSEC Iréné ===
ESSEC Iréné is the Institute for Research and Education on Negotiation in Europe created in 1996. The research focuses on several topics related to negotiation, mediation, stakeholder dialogue, and conflict resolution. The stakeholders involved include academics, senior civil servants, elected representatives, managers and employees of businesses, trade unionists, and social mediators.

=== ESSEC Behavioural Research Lab ===
This institute is an interdisciplinary research platform which focuses on the study of human behaviour in a controlled environment. The study is mainly conducted in fields such as behavioral marketing, behavioural management, behavioural and experimental economics.

== Organisation and governance ==
ESSEC is a non-profit organisation. Its management consists of a Director General (School Dean), assisted by its executive committee, made up in particular of the deans of programs, professors and research body. They report to the board, which administers the association, and is made up of two representatives of the Paris Ile-de-France CCI, a representative of the alumni association, and two qualified professionals.

The supervisory board is made up of twenty-eight members, six representatives of the Paris Ile-de-France CCI, two members of the Institute Catholique de Paris, five former students, one member of the Confederation of SMEs, four students, five professors, including the dean of the professors, two members of the administrative staff of the school, and three qualified professionals.

The general assembly is the guarantor of the stability of the statutes of the association, and it is composed of the president of the CCI of Paris Île-de-France, a representative of the association of graduates, a representative of the Confederation of SMEs, the dean of professors, and the rector of the Catholic Institute of Paris (ICP).

=== Deans of ESSEC Business School ===
From	To	Name
1939	1960	Camille Donjon
1960	1980	Gilbert Olivier
1980	1987	Julien Coudy
1987	1988	Jean-Claude Tournand
1988	1989	Jean Castarède
1990	1997	Jean-Pierre Boisivon
1998	2000	Gérard Valin
2001	2013	Pierre Tapie
2013	2017	Jean-Michel Blanquer
2017	present	Vincenzo Esposito Vinzi

== Rankings ==
	2016	2017	2018	2019	2020	2021	2022
FT - European Business School	18th	23rd	8th	7th	6th	8th	9th
Undergraduate - France							
Le Point - Classement des Bachelors (France)	1st	1st	1st	1st	1st	1st	1st
L'Étudiant - Classement des Bachelors (France)	1st	1st	1st	1st	1st		-
Graduate - Worldwide							
FT - Master in Management (Worldwide)	3rd	5th	4th	3rd	3rd	6th	6th
FT - Master in Finance (Worldwide)	7th	3rd	5th	-	4th	4th	-
QS - Master in Strategy & Management of International Business (Worldwide)	-	4th	4th	3rd	3rd	3rd	3rd
QS - Master in Finance (Worldwide)	-	10th	9th	9th	7th	7th	7th
QS - Master in Data Sciences & Business Analytics (Worldwide)	-	-	4th	3rd	3rd	3rd	4th
QS - Master in Marketing Management and Digital	-	-	-	-	-	-	4th
QS - Global MBA (Worldwide)	-	27th	26th	30th	27th	27th	27th
Executive - Worldwide							
FT - Executive Education Open (Worldwide)	18th	24th	23rd	21st	16th	13th	12th
FT - Executive Education Customised (Worldwide)	15th	17th	12th	5th	3rd	-	5th
FT - Executive MBA (Worldwide)	45th	47th	47th	45th	32nd		
The Economist - Executive MBA (Worldwide)	-	-	17th				
QS - Executive MBA (Worldwide)	-	7th	10th	10th	8th		

== Campuses ==
ESSEC Business School, Cergy-Pontoise	ESSEC Executive Education at la Defense, Paris	ESSEC Asia-Pacific in Singapore

ESSEC has 4 campuses: Cergy, Singapore, La Défense and Rabat. An Africa-Indian Ocean campus project in Mauritius was announced in 2016 but was cancelled in 2017.

=== Cergy campus ===
The main ESSEC campus is located in Cergy. Inaugurated in 1973, the site is located in the city and open to the public, mixing students and inhabitants in the area. In 2007, two new buildings were constructed: the Dome and the Galion, both significantly increased Cergy campus grounds. The Dome, which acts as a multipurpose room, can accommodate up to 2,700 people. It is used for business forums (Career Fairs), conferences, exam site, and cultural and social activities. The Galion is an administrative and educational building. It houses 54 offices and meeting rooms, 8 amphitheatres, and 12 classrooms as well as open work spaces. At the end of 2018, the Campus 2020 project was announced, which intends to modernise the Cergy campus by 2023, for a total cost of 35 million euros (private and public funding). Among the main lines of this project are the construction of a sports centre of nearly 2,000m^{2}, the redevelopment of the old gymnasium and the existing administration building into spaces intended for research activities.

=== La Défense campus ===
ESSEC has had premises in the CNIT in La Défense since 1989, mainly used for continuing education and the MBA program.

=== Singapore campus ===
The ESSEC Asia-Pacific campus in Singapore was announced in October 2012, by Pierre Tapie shortly before his departure. The new campus was inaugurated in May 2015, by Jean-Michel Blanquer. ESSEC has been present in Asia since 1980 with a permanent office in Japan and Singapore since 2005 through the ESSEC Asian Centre located in the National Library Building. After considering Tokyo, Shanghai and Singapore, among others, the school finally chose Singapore later, in 2005, in particular for its position as a gateway to Asia. Located in Nepal Hill, the campus spans five levels, 6,500m^{2}, can accommodate 1,500 students per year and cost 24 million euros, fully funded by ESSEC. It was designed by Singaporean architect, Dr. Liu Thai Ker (former architect planning Singapore).

=== Rabat campus ===
The creation of this campus was announced in November 2015, by Jean-Michel Blanquer and was inaugurated in April 2017. Morocco was chosen for the already effective presence of ESSEC's partner CentraleSupélec, its proximity to France and the large number of Moroccan alumni. Located 15 km from Rabat, the campus covers 6,000 m^{2} and has a capacity of 480 students. The campus is located right in the Casablanca - Rabat - Kenitra axis. The campus was built specifically for ESSEC by the Addoha real estate group to which the school pays rent (proportional to the number of students hosted during the first three years, then €360,000 / year beyond), with the possibility of purchasing the premises after nine years. In its first school year, the campus had seventy students, including eighteen Moroccans.

== Programs ==
=== ESSEC Global BBA ===
The undergraduate program was initially created in 1975 by ESSEC Group to prepare students to meet the needs of French firms launching operations on the international market. It was formerly known as EPSCI, "École des Practiciens du Commerce International", and is now referred to as "ESSEC Global BBA".

The Global BBA lasts for four years and is designed for candidates graduated from high school (in France "Baccalauréat").

At the end of the program, each student will have completed a minimum of 12 months of coursework abroad (each student will complete two exchange programs abroad), a one-month humanitarian project and between 11 and 18 months of professional experience, which may also take place abroad.

=== Master in Management - Grande École program ===
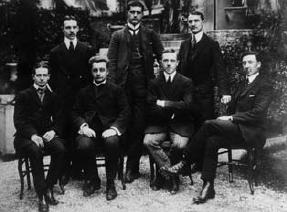
First ESSEC Graduates, class of 1909

ESSEC's postgraduate programme is its Master in Management (also called "Grande École program"), designed for students with no professional experience (instead of managers with 3–5 years of experience like US MBA programs). It is the flagship program of the school.

The ESSEC MSc in management has been historically designed for candidates who have completed French preparatory classes after getting a high school diploma and passing a competitive entrance examination known as the concours, or have a university degree (Bachelor or Master). Applications are now open to non-French students: students with a university degree of three years or more received outside of France can also apply. Students from classe préparatoire will spend two to three years after Baccalauréat only to prepare for the national entrance examination of Grandes Ecoles which includes a written part (lasting two weeks) as well as an oral part (one to four days for each grande école). It is one of the traditional pathways pursued by students in France (only 5% of a generation will be admitted to a prépa) aiming for advanced studies in Law, Medicine. It also provides intensive courses in Mathematics, History and Geography, Economy, Literature, Philosophy, and two foreign languages. In 2015, among more than 20,000 students enrolled in classe préparatoire (business section), 5,614 applied to ESSEC concours (considered one of the most difficult), only 890 were invited to oral examination and 380 were eventually admitted. This means an acceptance rate of 6.77%. Going outside during lesson time is also forbidden on school grounds.

ESSEC offer an à la carte program – whether following courses at ESSEC or at a partner institution, going abroad or focusing on an associative project etc.

=== Master in Finance ===
The Master in Finance replaced the old Master Techniques Financières in 2016. The Master in Finance is recognized by the French Higher Education and Research Ministry as master's degree.

There are three specialised tracks:

- Corporate Finance: M&A, Private Equity, ECM, DCM, Equity Research, Leveraged and Project Finance;
- Financial Markets: Sales, Trading, Risk Management and Portfolio Management;
- FinTech & Analytics: Quantitative Asset and Risk Management, Data-based Market Making and Trading and Quant Hedge Funds (with a solid Math/Physics degree).

The Master in Finance has a partnership with the Chartered Financial Analyst (CFA).

=== ESSEC M.S. Advanced Masters ===
The Advanced master's degrees are accredited by the "Conférence des Grandes Ecoles" in France. These programs are specialised to allow students or young professionals to complete their initial training (usually science or engineering) by acquiring complementary knowledge.

=== ESSEC Global MBA ===
The Global MBA at ESSEC Business School is a 12-month, full-time MBA program with an emphasis on emerging markets and experiential learning. It offers two Majors allowing students to specialise in the following areas: Luxury Brand Management, Strategy and Digital Leadership.

=== PhD in Business Administration ===
The PhD trains future professors, researchers and consultants. Before starting their dissertation work, students must follow a two-year program of courses and seminars that ends with preliminary examinations and a dissertation proposal. The curriculum starts with an intensive period of interdisciplinary training common to all students. This is followed by research training for the chosen field of specialisation.

=== ESSEC Executive Education ===
More than 5,000 managers participate in ESSEC Exec Ed programs every year, primarily at La Défense campus, located in the heart of Paris' financial district and ESSEC's Singapore campus.

=== ESSEC & Mannheim Executive MBA ===
ESSEC and Mannheim Business School launched their joint Executive MBA Program in 2004. Building on the first established Executive MBAs in Europe by ESSEC since 1994, several modules are proposed in Mannheim, Paris, Singapore and various other locations worldwide in partner business schools.

== International partnerships ==
ESSEC has developed exchange and double degree programs with numerous universities around the globe, including: UC Berkeley, University of Chicago, Dartmouth College, Brandeis University, Cornell University, Peking University, Tsinghua University, Seoul National University, Keio University, National University of Singapore, IIM Ahmedabad, IE Business School, University of Mannheim, King's College London, ESIC Business & Marketing School; and Fundação Getúlio Vargas' EAESP.

== Notable people and alumni ==
The association of graduates of the ESSEC or ESSEC Alumni group was founded in 1923, representing more than 60,000 graduates of ESSEC. It spans 75 countries and five continents and organizes more than a thousand events per year through its two hundred volunteers and employees. The network partners with 60 corporations, consists of 17 regional clubs and 73 chapters around the world. The association publishes the alumni magazine, Reflets, five times a year.

Since 2017, the association has maintained a physical office on the Cergy campus. That same year, lifelong ESSEC Alumni membership became included in tuition fees.

=== Notable alumni ===
==== Business ====
- Nicolas Hieronimus, CEO of L'Oréal Group
- Sue Nabi, CEO of Coty Inc.
- Marc Lelandais, Chairman of S. T. Dupont
- Benoît Coquart, CEO of Legrand
- Olivier Sichel, Deputy CEO of Caisse des dépôts et consignations, former CEO of Wanadoo
- Véronique Bédague, CEO of Nexity
- Antoine Bernard de Saint-Affrique, CEO of Danone
- Michel Bon, CEO of Carrefour (1985–1992), CEO of France Telecom (1995–2002)
- Patrick Cescau, CEO of Unilever
- Pierre-André de Chalendar, CEO of Saint-Gobain
- Corinne Vigreux, Co-founder of TomTom N.V.
- Nicolas Namias, CEO of Group BPCE
- Pierre Nanterme, CEO of Accenture
- Yves Perrier, CEO of Amundi, former CFO of Société Générale
- Pierre Denis, CEO of Jimmy Choo (fashion house)
- Marie-Christine Lombard, CEO of TNT Express
- Dominique Reiniche, CEO of Coca-Cola Europe
- Gilles Pélisson, CEO of TF1, former CEO of Bouygues Telecom (2004–2006) and of Accor Group (2006–2011)
- Charles Bouaziz, CEO of Monoprix S.A., former CEO of PepsiCo (Europe)
- Élisabeth Moreno, President of Hewlett-Packard Africa, former President of Lenovo France
- Thierry Peugeot, Chairman of the Supervisory Board of Peugeot-Citroën
- Jérôme Tafani, CEO of Burger King France

==== Politics ====
- Charles Konan Banny, former Prime Minister of Ivory Coast
- Oumar Tatam Ly, former Prime Minister of Mali
- Cécile Duflot, ex-French Minister of Housing in the Ayrault Cabinet, formerly head of the French Green Party and now head of Oxfam France
- Fleur Pellerin, ex-French Minister of Culture in the First Valls government.
- Emmanuelle Mignon, ex-Cabinet secretary of French President Nicolas Sarkozy from 2008 to 2012
- Alexis Kohler, Chief of Staff of President of France Emmanuel Macron

==== Academics ====
- D. K. Bandyopadhyay, Indian scientific management researcher

==== Other well-known alumni ====
- Gérald Caussé, Presiding Bishop of The Church of Jesus Christ of Latter-day Saints
- Marie-José Pérec, former sprinter, three times Olympic champion
- Philippe Sollers, French writer

== Controversies ==
In 2020, its campus in Singapore came under controversy when one of its students, Louise Pizon-Hébert, a French national, made multiple posts on Instagram during Chinese New Year by making slit-eyed gestures while wearing the cheongsam, and using the pejorative term "ching chong" in a separate post. The school has claimed that its disciplinary committee was currently "looking into the situation". As of 2024, no results from the committee have been made public.

On March 12, 2026, Didier Gaspard Owen Maximilien, 18-year-old French student uploaded a video on Instagram of himself licking a straw from the iJooz vending machine at Goldhill Centre in Singapore before putting it back in. He did it knowing that it would probably cause a public annoyance, according to a court investigation. He was charged with mischief. iJooz replaced all straws in the affected machine, and conducted sanitary checks. He left Singapore temporarily for three weeks for an internship to Manila as a graduation requirement while still facing charges. He was fined S$600.

== See also ==
- Chamber of Commerce and Industry of Paris
- HEC Paris
- ESCP Business School
- Triple accreditation
