= Jimmy Choo (fashion house) =

British luxury fashion house

J. Choo Limited
- Trade name: Jimmy Choo
- Type: Subsidiary
- Industry: Fashion
- Founded: 1996; 30 years ago
- Founders: Tamara Mellon OBE; Jimmy Choo OBE
- Headquarters: London, England, UK
- Key people: Hannah Colman (CEO); Sandra Choi (Creative Director and designer)
- Products: Shoes, handbags, accessories, fragrances
- Revenue: £364.0 million (2016)
- Operating income: £42.5 million (2016)
- Net income: £15.4 million (2016)
- Owner: Capri Holdings
- Number of employees: 1,278 (2016)
- Parent: Jimmy Choo Group Limited
- Website: jimmychoo.com

Jimmy Choo is a British luxury fashion house specialising in shoes, handbags, accessories and fragrances. The company, J. Choo Limited, was founded in 1996 by Malaysian Chinese couture shoe designer Jimmy Choo and British Vogue accessories editor Tamara Mellon. The brand claims to have been a favourite of Diana, Princess of Wales. The company was listed on the London Stock Exchange until it was acquired in November 2017 by Capri Holdings.

== History ==
=== Foundation (late eighties to 1996) ===
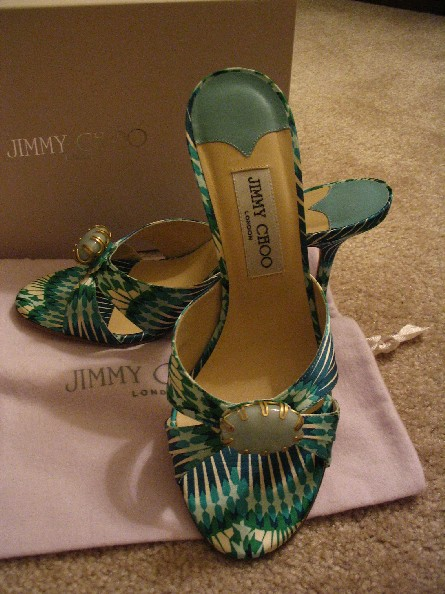
A pair of green Jimmy Choo shoes

The brand traces its roots to shoemaker Jimmy Choo who had set up his workshop in the late 1980s out of the converted Metropolitan Free Hospital in the East End of London. He was distributing his shoes at a stall of the local market. He was known by the editors of fashion industry magazines because he could recreate Manolo Blahnik's high-heeled shoes in different colours. Sandra Choi, Choo's wife's niece, joined him in 1989 and quickly became in charge of designing the shoes. In the early 1990s, Choo catered to the global jet set, including Diana, Princess of Wales. "Choo first met Diana [in 1991] when he was summoned to Kensington Palace by the princess after his name across in the Press. 'I was so excited I could not sleep the whole night. In fact I was so scared of oversleeping that I practically stay awaked.' [...] The subsequent meetings were even less formal and they soon became great friends."

The first ready-to-wear shoes were sold in September 1992 at the Gina store on 42 Sloane Street. In the early nineties, Jimmy Choo met with Tamara Mellon who, as a Vogue fashion assistant, would often ask Jimmy's help in customising shoes. After she quit Vogue, Tamara proposed in 1995 to Choo to develop a luxury, ready-to-wear line of shoes. The company was founded in May 1996 when Tom and Ann Yeardye decided to fund their daughter's idea by investing £150,000 in return for 50% of Jimmy Choo Limited and the right to use the name Jimmy Choo. Tamara was made President, Tom chairman.

=== Celebrities (1996-2001) ===
On July 5, 1998, Choo is mentioned in the fifth episode of HBO's Sex and the City: this marked the launch of a celebrity-driven go-to-market model. It confirmed the need to open a US store fast: this was done in November 1998. Following this opening, Tamara Mellon, Sandra Choi, and Marilyn Heston's Get Good Ink PR agency continued to work on the celebrities angle by making a large showing at the Academy Awards in March 1999: they dyed the Jimmy Choos they were loaning to actresses for the Oscars night in colours that matched their dresses.

These years were also marked by a growing tension between Choo and Tamara Mellon, with Tom Yeardye often acting as the calming agent. Choo was more interested in couture shoe making whereas the Yeardyes wanted to scale ready-to-wear: "I love the idea of couture and its emphasis on creation. [...] I leave the ready-to-wear to my partner and team." A pair of couture shoes would take two weeks to manufacture with the assistance of eight people.

In 1998, Choo moved his couture workshop from Hackney to 18 Connaught Street. Tom offered to buy Choo out but the latter refused to sell.

=== Phoenix / Equinox (2001-2004) ===
Robert Bensoussan, former director of sales for Sonia Rykiel (1986–89), director of international sales for Escada (1990–92), CEO of Christian Lacroix (1993–97) and Gianfranco Ferré (1999-2000) called Tamara Mellon in April 2001 to "convince her that he was the one who could take the business to the next level".

Bensoussan contacted David Burns, the head of the consumer, leisure and retail practice of Phoenix Equity Partners to set up with them "a new investment vehicle, Equity Luxury Holdings, which would invest in other UK brands that. like Jimmy Choo, could be developed."

The investment committee of Phoenix Equity considered the investment proposal on September 11, 2001. The terrorist attacks suspended the transaction. A couple of weeks later, David Burns enquired about Jimmy Choo's sales in the US and was surprised to read they were up by 30% to 40% year over year, which he compared to the tumbling share prices of the companies of the fashion industry.

Phoenix revalued the business from the £50 million the Yeardyes were asking for down to £18 million. The deal was closed on November 19, 2001. A new holding company, Yearnoxe Ltd., took over the European and US operations of Jimmy Choo Ltd.

Equinox controlled 51% of Yearnoxe, Tamara and Tom split evenly the remaining 49%. Robert Bensoussan was CEO, Tamara Mellon president, Tom Yeardye chairman. Choo sold his 50% stake of Jimmy Choo Limited for £8.8 million and left the company.

=== Lion Capital (2004-2007) ===
Lion Capital acquired a majority shareholding in November 2004. The company was valued at £101 million, i.e. 3 times the expected sales and 13x the expected operating profit of 2004. The owners of Jimmy Choo Limited would get £95.7m. Lion Capital was to buy the stakes of Equinox and the Yeardyes representing 78% of the company. The Yeardyes' 49% stake was worth £42.8m and Equinox's 51% £48.8m. Ann Yeardye was to receive £21.4m in cash, Tamara Mellon £12m in cash, £8.2m in stapled bonds with an underlying value of £18.2m and 3% in sweet equity (her total stake after the transaction was 12%).

Some of the staff got a stake, one of which was Hannah Colman, the first saleswoman who rose to be the European director of retail in 2004. The transaction was paid by leveraged debt: £45m to £50m was borrowed which represented 5 times the EBITDA of 2004. Equinox made net proceeds of £35 million, i.e. 4x the investment made 3 years earlier.

=== TowerBrook (2007-2011) ===
The company was sold on February 7, 2007 to TowerBrook Capital Partners and Gala Capital.

Jimmy Choo Limited was valued at £185 million, £170 million of which was paid upfront and £15 million in 2008 on performance. The £185 million valuation represented 2.2 times the sales and more than 10 times the operating profit of 2007. By selling its shares to TowerBrook, Lion Capital doubled its initial investment in two years. After the transaction, TowerBrook owned 65% to 70% of the company, Tamara Mellon was the second largest shareholder with a stake in the low teens (and a total annual compensation of £600,000: £300,00 in salary and £300,000 in benefits), Gala Capital the third largest with 10% and Robert Bensoussan the fourth largest shareholder. As part of the deal, Robert Bensoussan left the company in May 2007.

=== Labelux (2011-2014) ===
In 2011, it was sold to Labelux (which was integrated into its parent company, JAB Holding Company in July 2014) for £525.5 million. In 2012, the company hired ex-LVMH executive Pierre Denis as its CEO. Tamara Mellon left the business in 2011.

Sandra Choi was appointed sole Creative Director in 2013, having been with the brand since 1996 when she was responsible for overseeing the design studio.

As of late-2020, veteran Hannah Colman, who has been with the brand since inception, was named CEO.

=== Public Company (2014-17) ===
The company's IPO was announced in September 2014. In October 2014, the company announced it would price its London Stock Exchange listing at 140 pence a share, giving the firm an equity value of £546 million.

=== Michael Kors (since 2017) ===
The company put itself up for sale in April 2017. In July 2017, it was announced that the company would be bought by Michael Kors Holdings in a deal worth £896m. The transaction was completed on 1 November 2017.

== Shoes under licence ==
Separate to the Jimmy Choo ready-to-wear brand, the designer began Jimmy Choo Couture Limited in late 2006 to continue his work on the exclusive Jimmy Choo Couture shoe line, which is produced under licence from J. Choo Ltd., available by appointment only at Connaught Street in London.

== Stores ==
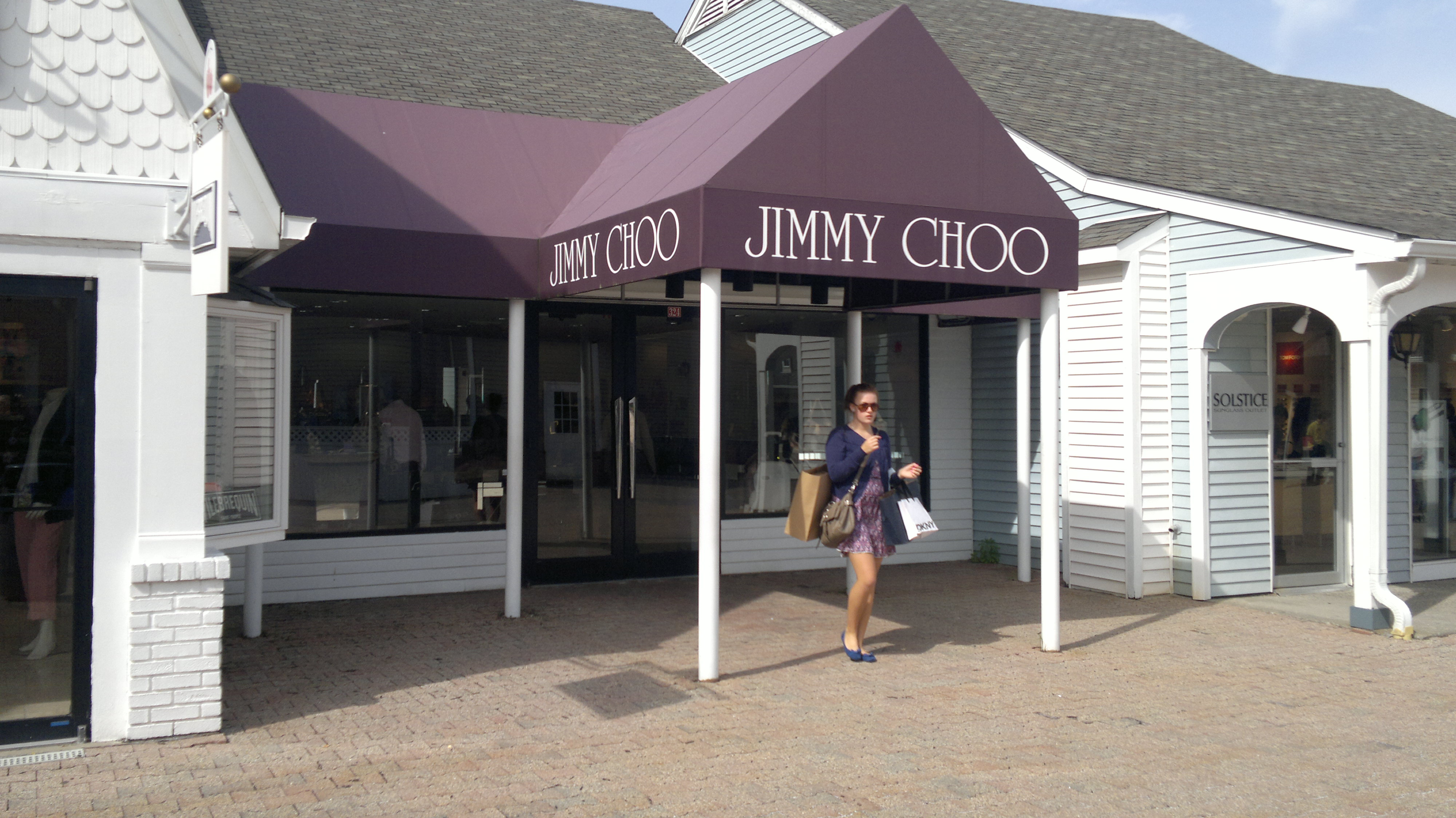
Jimmy Choo store at Woodbury Common, New York

The first Jimmy Choo store was opened in the fall of 1996 on Motcomb Street in London. The store's first saleswoman was 18-year old Hannah Colman, the girlfriend of Tamara's youngest brother, Daniel. In October 2001, the London store was moved to 169 Draycott Avenue.

In December 2003, a Jimmy Choo boutique opened on Bond Street and later a third on Sloane Street.

The first two US stores were opened in November 1998: a New York boutique in the Olympic Tower off Fifth Avenue, and a joint store with Vidal Sassoon in Los Angeles at the corner of North Canon and Little Santa Monica Boulevard (in 1998, the US stores were held jointly and evenly by Tom and Ann Yeardye on one side, Vidal Sassoon on the other).

Over the following years, Jimmy Choo expanded its store portfolio by opening directly operated stores and with local partners. Over 2011 and 2012, Jimmy Choo took control of the majority of its Asian operations in China, Hong Kong and Japan. Several boutiques are to be found in secondary outlets such as Saks Fifth Avenue, as well as smaller boutique stores on shopping estates such as Woodbury Common Premium Outlets in Central Valley, New York.

Together, Sandra Choi and CEO Hannah Colman have created a global force with a store network encompassing more than 200 boutiques and a presence in department and specialty stores worldwide.

== Awards ==
The brand has won awards for its products, including the British Fashion Council Awards Designer Brand category in 2008, the Accessories Council Brand of the Year 2008, the Footwear News Brand of the Year Award, and the 2009 Nordstrom Partners in Excellence award. Creative Director Sandra Choi was inducted into the Footwear News Hall of Fame in 2019.

== Enforcement ==
J. Choo Ltd. has over 600 design patents to its name. The company has brought up several prominent cases for copyright and trademark infringement, as well as being the target of "knock-off" counterfeit imports in the UK, the US and Australia. The company has sued Oasis, Warehouse and Marks & Spencer for copying shoes and bags.

== Cultural references ==
- Jimmy Choo suede and leather platforms worn by Carrie Bradshaw in American television show Sex and the City Season 3, Episode 1, 1999. She lost a shoe running to catch the Staten Island Ferry and said "I lost my Choo!"
- In 2004 a single from Godfather Buried Alive Album by Shyne featuring Ashanti (singer) Released A Song Called "Jimmy Choo" as well as a music video on YouTube.
- The Jimmy Choo "Abel pump" was featured in the South Korean TV show My Love, From The Star, in 2014
- In the 2006 US film The Devil Wears Prada, Jimmy Choo shoes are worn by Andy Sachs, assistant to the editor on 'Runway' magazine.
- Jimmy Choo footwear is worn by a villain, and cited as a clue to the nature of her character, in The Salt-Stained Book, a children's novel by Julia Jones.
- The Jimmy Choo "Vanessa 85" red suede and nappa pointy toe pumps were featured in the American TV show "House of Cards" Season 6, Episode 5, 2018. Character Jane Davis enters a room in the white house while carrying the pair of pumps in her hand.
- Choo was mentioned in the song, "Fabulous" in the movie 'High School Musical 2'. Sharpay Evans sings about Jimmy Choo commanding someone to fetch her Jimmy Choo flip flops.
- In Hilary Duff’s song “Dignity” featured on the album of the same name, Hilary mentions Jimmy Choo in the lyrics “You got the hottest shoes. You got those Jimmy Choo’s.”

== Brand ambassadors ==
In August 2023, Cho Mi-yeon of (G)I-dle became the brand's global ambassador. The same year, the Indian actress, Ananya Panday, was appointed as a brand ambassador of Jimmy Choo.

In September 2024, Wang Yibo became the Global Brand Ambassador of Jimmy Choo.
