= Sandra Choi =

British shoe designer

Sandra Choi OBE is a British-Asian businesswoman and fashion designer. She is the creative director of J. Choo Limited.

== Career ==
Choi was appointed Creative Director of J. Choo Limited at its inception in 1996, working in conjunction with Tamara Mellon OBE. The company's first J. Choo Limited store was opened in 1996 on Motcomb Street in London complementing distribution in selected department stores.

In September 2019, Choi discussed the redesigned Jimmy Choo brand logo with media. In January 2020, she collaborated with Kaia Gerber on a new combat-style boot with 15 percent of sales donated to St. Jude Children's Research Hospital.

== Personal life ==
Choi is married to Tamburlaine Gorst, son of Conservative politician Sir John Michael Gorst.
