= Marc Lelandais =

French business executive

Merc Lelandais
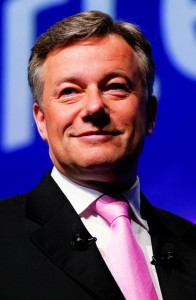
- Marc Lelandais

CEO of Vivarte
- In office July 2012 – October 2014
- Preceded by: Georges Plassat
- Succeeded by: Richard Simonin

Chairman of Lancel
- In office 2006–2012

Chairman of ST Dupont
- In office 2005–?

Personal details
- Born: 8 May 1966 (age 59) Mayenne, France
- Education: ESSEC Business School; Paris-Sorbonne University
- Occupation: Businessman

Marc Lelandais (born May 8, 1966 in Mayenne, France) is a French business executive in the luxury and textile industry. He became chairman of ST Dupont in 2005 and then Lancel from 2006 to 2012. In July 2012, he was made CEO of French clothing distributor Vivarte but was terminated in 2014. In 2015, he founded the consulting firm Pacello & Co.

== Early life and education ==
Lelandais earned an MBA in Luxury Brands Marketing and International Management from ESSEC Business School. He has a master's degree in Political Science and a Postgraduate Diploma in Marketing from the Paris-Sorbonne University, Paris.

== Career ==
Lelandais started his career in 1990 with the designer Pierre Cardin in the Perfumes and Cosmetics division. He managed the Sales and Marketing Department of the Parfums de Femme Distribution network (Marionnaud Parfumeries) and was responsible for the opening of new stores and brand marketing.

Lelandais worked briefly at watchmaker Raymond Weil, and then took over the Marketing Department at Children Worldwide Fashion. In 2001, he took charge of the Accessories, Leather Goods and Lifestyle division of the Escada Group, and took part in the launching of several new lines.

In September 2005 he took management of ST Dupont, which had been undergoing a difficult financial situation for many years. Lelandais left after six months because of disagreements with the Asian shareholder about the best approach to recovery. He was hired in 2006 by Richemont Group to restructure the company Lancel, which had been in financial difficulties. He developed a new line of leather goods promoted by celebrities, and marketed it in Asia. He oversaw the renovation of the Lancel stores. After six years Lelandais was dismissed by the Richmond Group.

In 2012, Lelandais became director of Vivarte Group (formerly André), which owns 24 fashion brands. In July 2012, he was made CEO succeeding Georges Plassat. He conducted a business reorientation of 17 companies through brand redeployment, internationalization, digitalization, and repositioning away from discount lines. The company was able to reduce its debt by 2 billion euros through a restructuring deal with its creditors. LeLandais was terminated because of disagreements with the shareholders over future governance. In 2014 Lelandais was replaced as CEO by Richard Simonin.

== Historical preservation ==
Lelandais has worked to preserve Renaissance buildings built between 1480 and 1515 in the Châteaux of the Loire Valley. He undertook the renovation of old houses at Amboise and Chaumont-sur-Loire by using local craftsmen. He purchased Château-Gaillard historical domain at Amboise and reopened it to the public in 2014 after four years of renovations. He is the administrator of the Société des Amis du Musée de Cluny, National Museum of the Middle Ages, Paris.

== Literature ==
- L'abbé Sieyès sous la Convention Nationale, Biography, 1989, Paris 1 Panthéon Sorbonne (OCLC 493178730)
- Les relations du personnel politique aux sondages d'opinion : histoire et analyse d'une entreprise politique : le barrisme de 1976 à 1991, 1991, Paris 1 Panthéon Sorbonne, Mémm DESS (OCLC 29456608)
