= École de Biologie Industrielle =

Engineering college in Cergy, France

Coordinates: 49°01′57″N 2°03′58″E

École de biologie industrielle
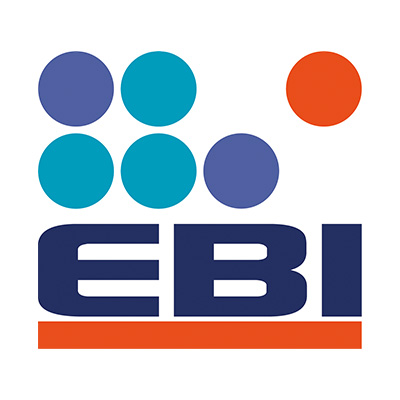
- Established: 1992
- President: Florence Dufour
- Location: Cergy, France
- Website: http://www.ebi-edu.com

EBI is a Grande Ecole d'Ingénieurs (Top graduate engineering school) founded in 1992, providing courses in Industrial Engineering with a strong focus on Biological Engineering.

EBI is a private technical further education establishment managed by a non-profit association, the purpose of which is to offer further education courses in industrial biology, whether in the form of initial training or continued vocational training. EBI is state-approved and authorised to teach scholarship students. It awards a Master's engineering degree recognised by the Engineering Qualifications Commission and also offers specialised 1-year postgraduate courses.

EBI's governing body is composed of various industrial partners : Air Liquide, Galderma, DERMA Développement, EFFIK, Association FERT, L'Oréal ...

It is chaired by Xavier YON, former CEO of GALDERMA.

EBI is a member of the Saint Louis Polytechnic Institute (with 2,200 students, 500 postgraduates every year), grouping together complementary specialist colleges in Cergy to provide a multidisciplinary approach to engineering sciences as well as lateral humanities and vocational training.

EBI is a founding member of the Cergy-Pontoise Val d’Oise further education and research centre, along with Cergy's other prestigious colleges (ESSEC, ENSEA, EISTI, etc.) and Cergy-Pontoise University. It is also member of the University of Paris-Seine.
