= École supérieure d'Informatique, réseaux et systèmes d'information =

Coordinates: 49.0412°N 2.0291°E

Ecole supérieure d'Informatique, réseaux et systèmes d'information
- Type: Public school
- Active: 1988–December 2012
- Rector: Alain Gourdin
- Location: Cergy, France
- Website: www.itin.fr

Ecole supérieure d'Informatique, réseaux et systèmes d'information (acronym ITIN) was a public higher education apprenticeship school in Cergy-Pontoise, France.

The school was created in Cergy, France, in 1988 under the signature of René Monory, French Minister of Education. In 2005, the school opened a second campus in Pontoise, France.

== Administrative status ==
ITIN is belonging to the Chamber of Commerce and Industry of Versailles-Val d'Oise-Yvelines.

The school is run with funds from the Regional council of Île-de-France region, from apprenticeship tax and from partner companies.

Diplomas delivered by ITIN are registered in the French National Diploma repository. Quality control is made by the Academic service for apprenticeship control (a department of the Ministry of National Education) and by the French National Diploma Commission

== Departments ==
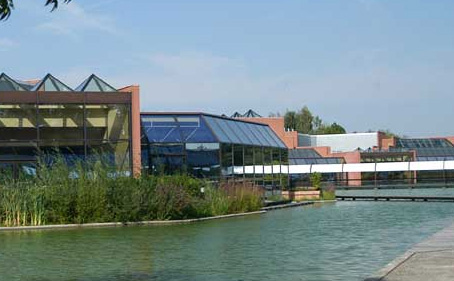
Campus of Cergy

- Information systems
- Telecommunications
- Computer networks
- Business of IT

== International ==
=== International strategy ===
ITIN has developed a training program, International Business Engineering, which is taught fully in English and in the near future intends to offer courses in English regarding the Management of Information systems. In this way foreign students can choose whether they want to study in English or in French at ITIN. The international development of ITIN is important for the school itself, and also for the students and companies employing them. The students gain international knowledge, experiences and skills. Students and teachers exchanges:

=== International partners ===
- Hoa Sen University, Vietnam
- Kharkiv National University of Radioelectronics, Ukraine
- Bharatiya Vidya Bhavan Campus, Mumbai, India
- Seinäjoki University of Applied Sciences, Finland
- Université Laval, Canada
- Babeş-Bolyai University, Cluj, Romania
- Staffordshire University, England
- University of Iaşi Romania
- Yeditepe University, Istanbul Turkey
- Tallinn University Estonia
- Bharatiya Vidya Bhavan Campus Mumbai India
- Södertörn University en Sweden
