= List of longest names in Taiwan =

Huang Hong-cheng, one of the longest names in Taiwan

According to name act in Taiwan, a Taiwanese citizen may have one legal name. A Taiwanese indigenous person or an ethnic minority member may register a name in accordance with their culture and customs. A Taiwanese indigenous person can also restore their ethnic name if a Han Chinese name was registered before. While a person can change their name if their transliteration is too long, the law doesn't limit the length of a person's name. A person can change their name three times in their lifetime.

A notable long name in Taiwan before was Huang Hong-cheng, with fifteen Chinese characters of "黃宏成台灣阿成世界偉人財神總統". Some of the longest names in Taiwan were created during the salmon chaos on March 17 and 18, 2021; a promotion by Sushiro offered a free sushi buffet to people with the name "鮭魚" (guīyú, salmon). Currently, the longest name in Taiwan recorded is "陳**有震天龍砲變身*****於二零二一三月十四日與**穩定交往中愛妳愛一生一世此生想帶妳一起吃鮭魚" with fifty Chinese characters.

This list includes the longest names reported by local media in Taiwan, with their lengths in Chinese characters, English translations, and other notes. The list stops at "朗論·馬哩吉·以斯馬哈善·以斯立段", the longest unchanged name in Taiwan.

== List ==
Longest names in Taiwan
Name	Length in Chinese characters	English Translation	Notes	Sources
陳○○有震天龍砲變身△△△△△於二零二一三月十四日與××穩定交往中愛妳愛一生一世此生想帶妳一起吃鮭魚	50	Chen ○○, wielding a Black Dragon Cannon and can transform into △△△△△, has been in a steady relationship with ×× since March 14, 2021. Love you, my true love in this lifetime, and I want to eat salmon with you for the rest of my life.	The person is a male who lives in New Taipei City. "Chen ○○" is his former name. Black Dragon Cannon (震天龍砲) is a weapon in Counter-Strike Online. "△△△△△" is a special skill in a game. "××" is his girlfriend's name. The man changed his name during the Salmon Chaos.	
李圭歸瑰規硅閨邽龜鮭魚於瑜餘娛虞盂妤漁愚愉于余蝓腴予輿渝嵎榆算了我想得好累隨便啦	40	Lee guī guī guī guī guī guī guī guī guī yú yú yú yú yú yú yú yú yú yú yú yú yú yú yú yú yú yú yú yú. Forget it, I can't think of any more, whatever.	The person is a male who lives in Tainan City. The last of guī and the first of yú is "鮭魚". Nine characters after "李" (lee) and before "鮭" are pronounced guī, while all twenty characters before "算" (suan) are pronounced yú. The man changed his name during the Salmon Chaos.	
○○○德國語文學系雅馬哈發動車壓車磨膝鮭魚大元帥謝謝×××讓我改名子△△大戶發大財	40	○○○ of the Department of German Language. The Generalissimo of Yamaha, Motorcycle Cornering, Kneeling Down, and Salmon. Thanks to ××× for letting me change my name. Prosperity to the △△ family.	The person is a male who lives in Changhua County, a college student majoring in German language and a motorcycle enthusiast. "Yamaha" (雅馬哈) refers to the Yamaha Motor Company, a Japanese manufacturer of motorcycles. "Motorcycle Cornering" and "Kneeling Down" are cornering techniques in motorcycles. "×××" is the person's mother, and the "△△ family" is his family. The man changed his name during the Salmon Chaos.	
陳愛台灣國慶鮑鮪鮭魚松葉蟹海膽干貝龍蝦和牛肉美福華君品晶華希爾頓凱薩老爺	36	Chen loves the Taiwan’s's National Day, abalone, tuna, salmon, snow crab, sea urchin, conpoy, lobster, Wagyu, Mayfull, Howard, Palais de Chine, Regent, Hilton, Caesar, and Royal	The person is a male who lives in New Taipei City. The name combines luxury foods and hotel chains in Taiwan. The man changed his name during the Salmon Chaos, and once held the longest name in Taiwan at the incident before Chen.	
高仕承台灣高雄楠梓之子爆裂高屏阿承楠梓後勁溪迴游之祖鮭魚智波佐助	32	Gao Shih-Cheng, son of Nanzih, Kaohsiung shakes Kaohsiung and Pingtung. (Also known as) A-Cheng, forebear of migration in the Houjin River, Nanzih. Salsuke Uchiha	The person is a male who lives in Kaohsiung City. The name was changed during the salmon chaos. "Salsuke Uchiha" (鮭魚智波佐助) is a calque from "salmon" (鮭魚) and "Sasuke Uchiha" (宇智波佐助), a character of Naruto. The word "爆裂" (lit, "explosive") in this context is slang describing something over-the-top. The man changed his name during the Salmon Chaos.	
劉育銓鮭魚鮪魚旗魚鮮蝦甜蝦干貝鮑魚海膽和牛松葉蟹大閘蟹龍蝦	29	Liu Yu-Chyuan: Salmon, tuna, billfish, fresh shrimp, sweet shrimp, conpoy, abalone, sea urchin, Wagyu, snow crab, Chinese mitten crab, and lobster	The person changed their name during the Salmon Chaos, which combines with seafood.	
洪燒黃金頂級帕馬森起司鮭魚智波鼬想吃炙燒鮑魚智波佐助	26	Hong, the braising premium parmesan Salmon Itachi Uchiha wants to eat scorched abalone Sasuke Uchiha	The person is a male who lives in Taichung City. He is a classmate of "Huang the Salsuke Parmesan" below. "洪燒" is pronounced hóngshāo in Chinese, making it a pun on "紅燒" (hóngshāo, braising). The man changed his name during the Salmon Chaos.	
黃金頂級帕瑪森起司洪燒鮭魚智波佐助想吃炙燒鮑魚智波鼬	26	Huang, the golden premium parmesan Salsuke Uchiha wants to eat scorched abalone Itachi Uchiha	The person is a male who lives in Taichung City. He is a classmate of "Hong the Itachi Parmesan" above. The man changed his name during the Salmon Chaos.	
黃大嵐是喜神財神衰神福德正神所有神祝福的寶貝小心肝	25	Huang Da-Lan is a beloved child blessed by all deities, including the God of Fortune, the God of Wealth, the God of Misfortune, and the righteous God of Virtue and Blessing	The person is a male who lives in Tainan City. He is a Taoist taxi driver who sought the blessing of all Taoist deities and therefore changed his name. Huang believed that fortune and misfortune are both part of life, so there's no need to avoid misfortune in his name. It was the longest name in Taiwan before the Salmon Chaos.	
○○○帥鮭魚王者改名來吃壽司郎賠錢賠的爽不爽	22	○○○, the Handsome Salmon King, changed his name to eat (free) sushi. How does it feel to lose money, Sushiro?	The person is a male who lives in Taichung City. The man changed his name during the Salmon Chaos.	
晉瑋臺灣台東之子大麻煩要投油土伯歐薩斯	19	Jin-Wei, son of Taitung. Big Trouble votes for Osas the YouTuber	"Votes for" (要投, also a homophone of "藥頭", i.e. "drug dealer") is a Taiwanese YouTuber. "Big Trouble" (大麻煩) is a YouTuber promotion group whose name plays a pun on "Marijuana" (大麻) and "Troubles" (麻煩). "Osas" refers to Ovuvuevuevue Enyetuenwuevue Ugbemugbem Osas, a meme in Taiwan for its difficult pronunciation. Big Trouble described the change as "performance art".	
林蔡鮭魚趙鮪魚生日快樂大家一起同鮭魚盡	19	Lin Tsai Salmon, Zhao Tuna, Happy birthday to you. Everyone, let's perish together with salmon	The person is a male who lives in Kaohsiung City. "同鮭魚盡" is a homophone pun of a Chinese idiom "同歸於盡" ("to perish together"). The man changed his name during the Salmon Chaos.	
台中積極青年鮭魚吃到飽建築師獨裁思密達	19	An energetic young architect from Taichung who eats as much salmon as he can. A dictator-seumnida.	The person is a male who lives in Taichung City. -seumnida (思密達) references "-습니다", a formal polite declarative suffix in Korean language. The man changed his name during the Salmon Chaos.	
○魽鮭魚不沾醬油只沾哇沙米吃才是王道	18	○, The proper way to eat ○-kan and salmon with wasabi and never soy sauce	The person is a male who lives in Taichung City. In Chinese, the greater amberjack is called "紅魽" (hong-kan), close to "○-kan" (○魽); "○" represents the person's surname. The man changed his name during the Salmon Chaos.	
盧卡吃鮭魚咪苦雨萌鯊鯊敲口愛乒乒乓乓	18	Luca eats salmon. Miku, Yu-Moe, and Shark-Shark are adorkable! Ping-Ping Pong-Pong	The person is a male who lives in Hsinchu City. In Taiwan, "Shark-Shark" (鯊鯊) is a nickname of Gawr Gura, a virtual YouTuber from Hololive English. The man changed his name during the Salmon Chaos.	
鮭魚吃到爽消極青年建築師共產思密達	17	A passive young architect from Taichung who eats as much salmon as he can. A communist-seumnida.	The person is a male who lives in Taichung City. The man changed his name during the Salmon Chaos.	
○○○和把餔去找摸摸卡買宇智波鮭魚	17	○○○ is going with ba-bu to find momoka and buy Salmon Uchida	The person is a male who lives in Hsinchu City but changed his name in Taoyuan. The man changed his name during the Salmon Chaos.	
顏色不分藍綠支持性專區顏色田慎節	16	Yeh, without the colour of Blue and Green Should Both Support the Special Sex Zone. The colour is Tien Shen-chieh	Molly Yen is a Taiwanese politician in Chiayi City. The name references Taiwan's two major political coalitions, the Pan-Blue and Pan-Green, framing the "colour field" as emphasising the ostensibly bipartisan nature of the special sex zone issue, i.e. the establishment of regulated red-light districts. The last character 節 is also a homophone of 潔, which means "pure" or "innocent". The final part of the name can therefore be read as "be cautious of being pure/innocent", a reference to the Hsu-Kuang Senior High School sexual assault case. (Note: In the incident, a male student allegedly raped his female peer over two years. The government issued a publication ban on the perpetrator's name due to child protection and privacy concerns. Still, netizens alleged that the government covered up the incident, and Yen changed her name to protest the government's ban.) Yen changed her name back on 26 December 2023.	
林家丞台灣之光財神羅伯特歐薩斯	15	Lin Chia-Chen, Light of Taiwan; Robert Osas, God of Wealth	The person is a male who lives in Kaohsiung City. Lin said he had bad luck in 2020, and hoped the new name would bring good fortune. The man changed his name before the Salmon Chaos.	
黃宏成台灣阿成世界偉人財神總統	15	Huang Hong-cheng, Ah Cheng from Taiwan, World's Greatest Man, God of Wealth, and President	Huang Hong-cheng is a Taiwanese performance artist. He changed his name twice, and his last change occurred on 23 May 2015. It was the longest name in Taiwan before Jin-Wei and the Salmon Chaos.	
李我要單列族名我的布農族名字是Savungaz Valincinan	15 (Note: 15 letters of her Bunun name excluded)	Lee I want to exclusively list my tribal name, my Bunun tribal name is Savungaz Valincinan	Savungaz Valincinan is a Bunun female and a Taiwanese indigenous activist. She used the Han name "Li Pinhan" (Note: Chinese: 李品涵; pinyin: Lǐ Pǐnhán; Wade–Giles: Li³ P'in³-han²) before using her Bunun name. Dissatisfied with the government's mandatory usage of Chinese characters for Indigenous Taiwanese names, (Note: The Formosan languages are written with Latin characters, which activists argue preserve the original pronunciation and allow for the proper transfer of oral histories. For Indigenous Taiwanese names on official documents, three options are offered: Traditional names transliterated with Chinese characters, Traditional names transliterated with Chinese characters with Latin characters underneath, or a Han Chinese name with Latin characters underneath.) Savungaz changed the name into "Lee I want..." to protest the policy. She changed her legal name to "Savungaz Balincinan" in 2026. According to Savungaz, "Balincinan" is closer to the pronunciation than "Valincinan".	
蔣鮭魚與熊掌好吃藥師國考一次過	15	Chiang, who finds salmon and bear's paw delicious, wishes to pass her pharmacist test on the first try.	The person is a female who lives in Kaohsiung City. There's a proverb 魚與熊掌不可兼得 (lit, "One cannot get fish and bear's paw at the same time") in Chinese which means "You can't have your cake and eat it". The woman changed her name during the Salmon Chaos.	
劉品鮭魚麟壽司郎吃到飽妹子約嗎	15	Liu eats salmon's scale. Sushiro buffet. Any girls to hang out?	The person is a male who lives in Tainan City. The man changed his name during the Salmon Chaos.	
張○○宜蘭之子超粗大深海鮭魚王	15	Chang ○○, son of Yilan, the Super Big Thick Deep Sea Salmon King	The person is a male who lives in Keelung City. While living in Keelung, the police officer was born in Yilan. The man changed his name during the Salmon Chaos.	
蕭花花公子帥鮭魚阿這個名字帥嗎	15	Hsiao the playboy and the handsome salmon. Well, is this name hot to you?	The person is a male who lives in Tainan City. The man said he changed the name so he could treat friends in Sushiro after losing a bet with them. The man changed his name during the Salmon Chaos.	
潘鮭魚爭鮮巨蛋店服務員一號紀守	15	Pan "Salmon" Chi-Shou, the first staff member of Sushi Express Arena Branch	The person is a male who lives in Kaohsiung City. He is an employee of a Sushi Express restaurant near Kaohsiung Arena. The man changed his name during the Salmon Chaos.	
鮭鮑魚俊凱敏和明山朱馬金泰爾	14	Salmon Abalone Jun-Kai-Min and Min Shan Zhu Ma Kim Tai-Er	The person is a male who lives in Taichung City. The man changed his name during the Salmon Chaos.	
鮭魚這個名字是為了壽司郎改的	14	Salmon. I changed my name for Sushiro.	The person is a male who lives in Taichung City. The man changed his name during the Salmon Chaos.	
朗論·馬哩吉·以斯馬哈善·以斯立段	14	Landrun Maleji Ismahasan Islituan	The person is a Bunun male of mixed Rukai descent living in Kaohsiung City. According to Landrun, Landrun is his Bunun name and Maleji is his Rukai name. Ismahasan is his father's surname and Islituan is his ancestor's surname. It is the longest unchanged name in Taiwan.	

== See also ==
- Hubert Blaine Wolfeschlegelsteinhausenbergerdorff Sr.
- List of long place names
- List of long species names
- Longest words
