= ZNF703 =

Protein-coding gene in the species Homo sapiens

Identifiers
- Aliases: ZNF703, ZEPPO1, ZNF503L, ZPO1, NLZ1, zinc finger protein 703
- External IDs: OMIM: 617045; MGI: 2662729; GeneCards: ZNF703

Gene location (Human)
Chr.	Chromosome 8 (human)
Band	8p11.23	Start	37,695,782 bp
Band	8p11.23	End	37,700,019 bp

Gene location (Mouse)
Chr.	Chromosome 8 (mouse)
Band	8|8 A2	Start	27,467,353 bp
Band	8|8 A2	End	27,471,489 bp
RNA expression pattern
Bgee	Human / Mouse (ortholog); Top expressed in: skin of arm; nipple; muscle of thigh; gastrocnemius muscle; body of tongue; Skeletal muscle tissue of rectus abdominis; popliteal artery; tibial arteries; mucosa of transverse colon; pylorus / Top expressed in: ankle joint; ankle; transitional epithelium of urinary bladder; internal carotid artery; lip; external carotid artery; adrenal gland; hair follicle; skin of external ear; brown adipose tissue; More reference expression data
BioGPS	n/a
Gene ontology
Molecular function	metal ion binding; protein binding; nucleic acid binding
Cellular component	cytoplasm; nuclear matrix; nucleus; protein-containing complex
Biological process	positive regulation of mammary gland epithelial cell proliferation; regulation of transcription, DNA-templated; adherens junction assembly; positive regulation of cell migration; regulation of canonical Wnt signaling pathway; cellular response to estradiol stimulus; positive regulation of epithelial to mesenchymal transition; transcription, DNA-templated; mammary gland epithelial cell differentiation; regulation of cell cycle; regulation of transforming growth factor beta receptor signaling pathway; negative regulation of homotypic cell-cell adhesion; positive regulation of cell population proliferation; negative regulation of transcription, DNA-templated
Sources:Amigo / QuickGO
Orthologs
Databases	NCBI: entry; OMA: entry
Species	Human	Mouse
Entrez	80139	353310
Ensembl	ENSG00000183779	ENSMUSG00000085795
UniProt	Q9H7S9	P0CL69
RefSeq (mRNA)	NM_025069	NM_001101502; NM_001110508
RefSeq (protein)	NP_079345	NP_001094972; NP_001103978
Location (UCSC)	Chr 8: 37.7 – 37.7 Mb	Chr 8: 27.47 – 27.47 Mb
PubMed search
- Wikidata
View/Edit Human	View/Edit Mouse

zinc finger protein 703

Identifiers
- Symbol: ZNF703
- NCBI gene: 80139
- HGNC: 25883
- RefSeq: NM_025069

Other data
- Locus: Chr. 8 p12

ZNF703 is a gene which has been linked with the development of breast cancers. ZNF703 is contained within the NET/N1z family responsible for regulation of transcription essential for developmental growth especially in the hindbrain. Normal functions performed by ZNF703 include adhesion, movement and proliferation of cells. ZNF703 directly accumulates histone deacetylases at gene promoter regions but does not bind to functional DNA.

Following research by scientists at Cancer Research UK, it was the first oncogene discovery in the past six years.

ZNF703 is a part of 8p12 telomeric amplicon that is associated with Luminal B breast cancer. Recently, ZNF703 is identified as the driver of 8p12 locus amplification.

Patients diagnosed with luminal B cancer caused by ZNF703 typically have lower recovery and survival rates than other cancer types.

Drug resistance of ZNF703 has been displayed when patients are treated using anti-cancer drug Tamoxifen.

== Discovery ==
Researchers discovered the carcinogenic nature of ZNF703 in 2011 while conducting research on the classification and resistance of various oncogenes. Researchers attempted to discern factors associated with various cancer types through observation of the oncogenic mechanism on a molecular scale. The luminal B cancer pathway exhibited an amplification of 5 different genomic areas including the chromosome region 8p12. Amplification of region 8p12 occurred through transcriptional regulation of ZNF703.

== Location ==
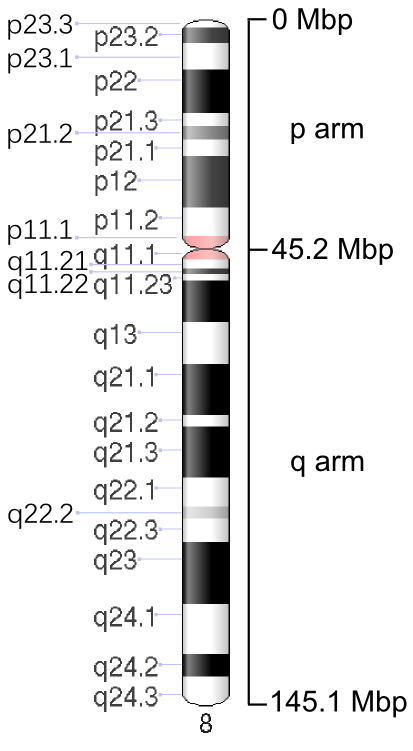
Oncogene ZNF703 is located at the p-arm of human chromosome 8 at position 8p12.

ZNF703 is located on human chromosome 8 at the short arm region commonly named chromosome region 8p12. Tumors generated by ZNF703 have shown loss in size beginning at the telomere and ending at 8p12 while the 8p12-11 region has increased size. A fluctuation between increase and decrease is present along the 8p12-8p21 boundary region of the chromosome. A pattern has been found that involves three similar regions of disrupted growth and four regions of enhanced growth starting from the telomere and ending at the centromere.

== Role in cancer ==
The ZNF703 gene generally plays an active role in luminal B tumor cells contained in mammary ducts. Typically, ZNF703 expression is greater when the tumors are estrogen receptor positive as opposed to estrogen receptor negative. ZNF703 is co-expressed in a nuclear complex containing genes DCAF7, NCRO2 and PHB2. ZNF703 generates a nuclear protein responsible for oestrogen receptor associated protein repression. Gene expression of stem cells are triggered when the ZNF703 gene becomes overexpressed in the complex. As a result, both regular cells and cancer stem cell abundance increases rapidly. ZNF703 overexpression also causes primary and secondary tumorsphere development alongside amplified production of CD49F- positive cells associated with colon cancer.

ZNF703 also experiences target regulation of cancer cells through the transcription of RNA SPRY4-It1. RNA SPRY4-IT1 is a non-coding gene responsible for preventing apoptosis and generating large tumors.

Researchers recently established a link between the trigger gene ZNF703 and Akt/mTOR pathway activation involved in the cellular cycle resulting in lung tumor formation.

== Prognosis ==
The lifespan of individuals with colorectal cancer and luminal cancer have different prognosis depending on the amount of expression of the ZNF703 gene. Low amounts of transcription of ZNF703 usually leads to a healthier prognosis than individuals experiencing higher levels of transcription of the oncogene. ZNF703 is a target for therapeutic medicines since survival rates increase as transcription rates decrease.

== Resistance to drugs ==
The drug Tamoxifen is a commonly administered drug used to treat luminal cancers in patients. Half of patients treated with Tamoxifen are resistant to the drug. Overexpression of ZNF703 has been linked to Tamoxifen resistance. As transcription of the ZNF703 gene reaches substantial levels, instead of blocking cell proliferation, Tamoxifen is found to increase cancer cell division. Tamoxifen can only be given at low dosages and patients are monitored daily in order to avoid tumor growth.
