= Salmon chaos =

2021 incident of name changes in Taiwan

- Traditional Chinese: 鮭魚之亂
- Literal meaning: Salmon chaos
Transcriptions
Standard Mandarin
- Hanyu Pinyin: Guīyúzhīluàn

In March 2021, a wave of Taiwanese people changed their legal names to include the Chinese word for salmon (鮭魚, guīyú) to take advantage of a promotion by the Japanese conveyor belt sushi chain Sushiro. The chain offered free sushi to guests whose names included the word. This phenomenon was dubbed the "salmon chaos" by English-language media. The incident garnered significant criticism by public figures and the general population.

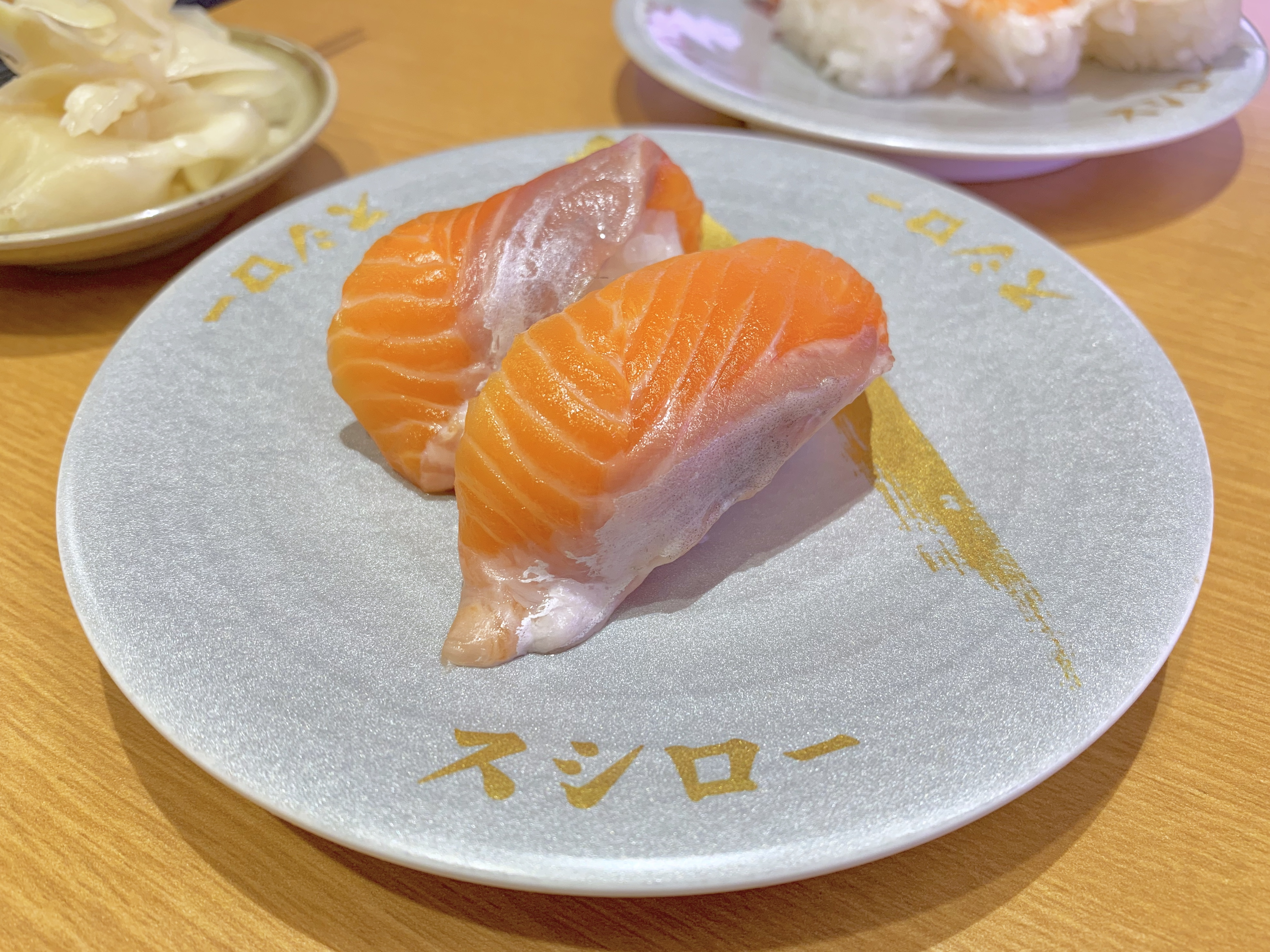
Two pieces of salmon sushi served at Sushiro, the chain restaurant involved in the incident.

== Background ==
On May 20, 2015, the Name Act was amended to allow three legal name changes under six circumstances, including if:

The applicant's given name is unflattering or has an excessively long Romanized form, or there are other special considerations.

— Name Act (姓名條例), Article 9

This condition, in practice, allowed any name a person wants. Three days after the act was amended, Huang Hong-cheng changed his name to the fifteen-character-long "黃宏成台灣阿成世界偉人財神總統", which Taiwan News translates as "Taiwan's World's Greatest Man, President, and God of Wealth".

== Incident ==
Sushiro

Between March 10 and March 21, 2021, Sushiro ran an advertising campaign revolving around salmon sushi. Sushiro advertised an upcoming promotion through their Facebook page: on March 17 and 18, people whose names are homophones with the word for salmon (Chinese: 鮭魚; pinyin: guīyú) could dine at discounted prices. Additionally, people whose names had the exact characters for salmon could eat for free with up to five other people.

On March 16, a comedic news channel, owned by the Internet forum CK101, posted to Facebook a picture of three identification cards with the names "Liao Salmon", "Zhangjian Salmon", and "Liu Pinhan Handsome Salmon". The post became viral, leading to more people following suit and changing their names, intending to change them back after the promotion ended. The record for longest name was repeatedly broken: it was first 36 characters, (Note: 陳愛台灣國慶鮑鮪鮭魚松葉蟹海膽干貝龍蝦和牛肉美福華君品晶華希爾頓凱薩老爺) then 40 characters, (Note: 李圭歸瑰規硅閨邽龜鮭魚於瑜餘娛虞盂妤漁愚愉于余蝓腴予輿渝嵎榆算了我想得好累隨便啦) then 50 characters. (Note: 陳**有震天龍砲變身*****於二零二一三月十四日與**穩定交往中愛妳愛一生一世此生想帶妳一起吃鮭魚.) In a widely publicized story, a Taichung university student used his third and final name change to "Zhang Salmon Dream" (張鮭魚之夢) and was horrified upon learning that it would be permanent. Taichung's Civil Affairs Bureau indicated that he had only changed his name twice, and urged him to change it back. The Liberty Times reported that by March 19, at least 332 people changed their name for the event.

== Reactions ==
Government officials and politicians condemned the name changes. Some employees at Household Registration Offices, which process the name changes, reportedly tried to persuade applicants against changing their names, with varying degrees of success. Deputy Minister of the Interior Chen Tsung-yen remarked, "this kind of name change not only wastes time but causes unnecessary paperwork."

The public's reaction to the name changes were generally negative. Multiple writers commented on a "split" in ethical values between older and younger generations. Criticism was also targeted against food waste generated during the craze, after images of people only eating the fish and leaving behind the rice surfaced online. After foreign news agencies reported on the story, multiple Taiwanese news outlets called the incident an "international embarrassment".

Writer Nick Wang defended the name changes, saying that "there's nothing wrong with being greedy and saving money."

In May 2022, the Legislative Yuan debated changes to the law to avoid a similar incident and to possibly help people who had used their three name changes and were stuck with a name related to salmon.
