= Sushi terrorism =

Japanese restaurant prank

In a conveyor belt sushi restaurant, food passes other patrons on its way to the person who eats it

Sushi terrorism and related terms refer to pranks and antisocial behavior in restaurants in Japan, especially conveyor belt sushi restaurants. The unhygienic pranks include licking soy sauce bottles and adding an extreme portion of wasabi to sushi. A series of events began in early 2023 and some acts were widely shared on social media.

These incidents caused a scandal in Japan, a country renowned for its strict hygiene and cleanliness standards, and emphasis on social cohesion. Following the incidents, the popularity of conveyor belt sushi restaurants declined, and chains like Kura Sushi were inundated with customer complaints, prompting urgent and thorough cleaning measures. One of the individuals involved was a high school student, leading to numerous complaints directed at his school.

== Etymology ==
In Japanese language, the phenomenon is not limited to conveyor belt sushi restaurants, and is more generally referred to as dining-out terrorism (外食テロ), customer terrorism (客テロ) or restaurant terrorism (飲食店テロ). When specifically referring to conveyor belt sushi restaurants, the term is kaitenzushi tero (回転寿司テロ). Since many of the culprits are of Generation Z, they have been jokingly referred to as Z combatant (Z戦士) as if guerrillas engaging in asymmetric warfare.

== Incidents ==
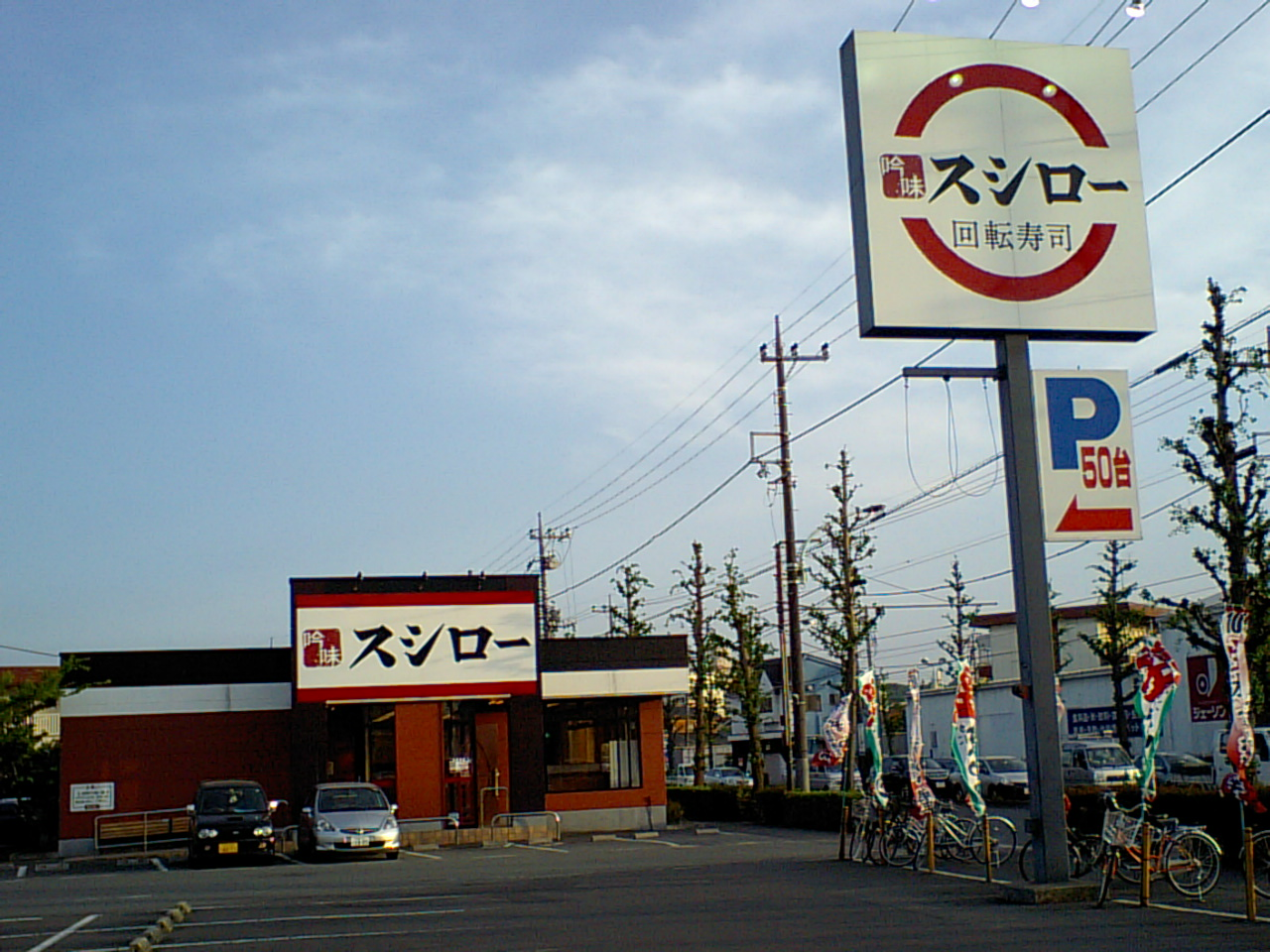
The conveyor belt sushi brand Sushiro was affected by sushi terrorism.

On January 5, 2023, three individuals aged between 15 and 21 filmed themselves at a Sushiro conveyor belt sushi restaurant in Gifu. In the video, they licked a piece of sushi on the conveyor belt before consuming it and drank directly from a communal soy sauce bottle. Initially shared on Instagram, the video garnered over 40 million views on Twitter. Subsequently, similar videos from other restaurants surfaced on platforms like Twitter and TikTok, some of which appeared to have been recorded weeks or even years earlier. In other instances, perpetrators placed wasabi on sushi intended for other customers.

A complaint was filed against the three individuals involved in the initial incident, leading to their arrest on March 8. Two of them were apprehended in Aichi Prefecture and faced potential prison sentences of up to three years. Other chains, such as Hama-sushi and Kura Sushi, also announced legal actions, with some planning to install cameras to monitor customers. Akindo Sushiro sought approximately 67 million yen in damages from one of the individuals.

In February 2025, a 40-year-old unemployed woman in Fukuoka was arrested and charged with "criminal damage" for squishing a sesame bun in a Lawson convenience store after having committed several similar acts previously.

== Impact ==
In the days following the viral video's release, shares of Food & Life Companies Co., Ltd., the parent company of Sushiro, dropped by nearly 5%. The company responded by replacing all soy sauce bottles in the affected restaurant, cleaning all cups, and enhancing hygiene protocols. Some restaurants considered replacing physical conveyor belts with virtual ones or removing communal seasoning bottles to prevent future incidents. Businessman Takafumi Horie suggested increasing restaurant entry prices as a deterrent.

Agriculture Minister Tetsuro Nomura commented on the incidents, stating, "It is very unfortunate that such an act took place, as it had a significant impact on food industry operators, and the Ministry of Agriculture, Forestry and Fisheries will pay special attention to the situation in the future."

== See also ==
- Part-time job terrorism
- Freeter
- NEET
- IJooz – similar unhygienic prank in Singapore
