= Cold pasteurization =

Cold pasteurization may refer to:

- Pascalization, a method of preserving and sterilizing food, in which a product is processed under very high pressure
- Food irradiation, exposing foodstuffs to ionizing radiation to preserve food, reduce the risk of food borne illness, prevent the spread of pests, delay or eliminate sprouting or ripening, increase juice yield, or improve re-hydration
- Any of various other non-thermal methods, see Pasteurization § Novel pasteurization methods
