= IJooz =

Vending machine selling orange juice

iJooz
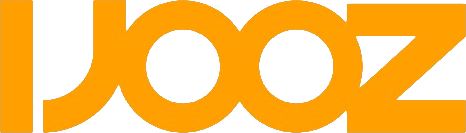

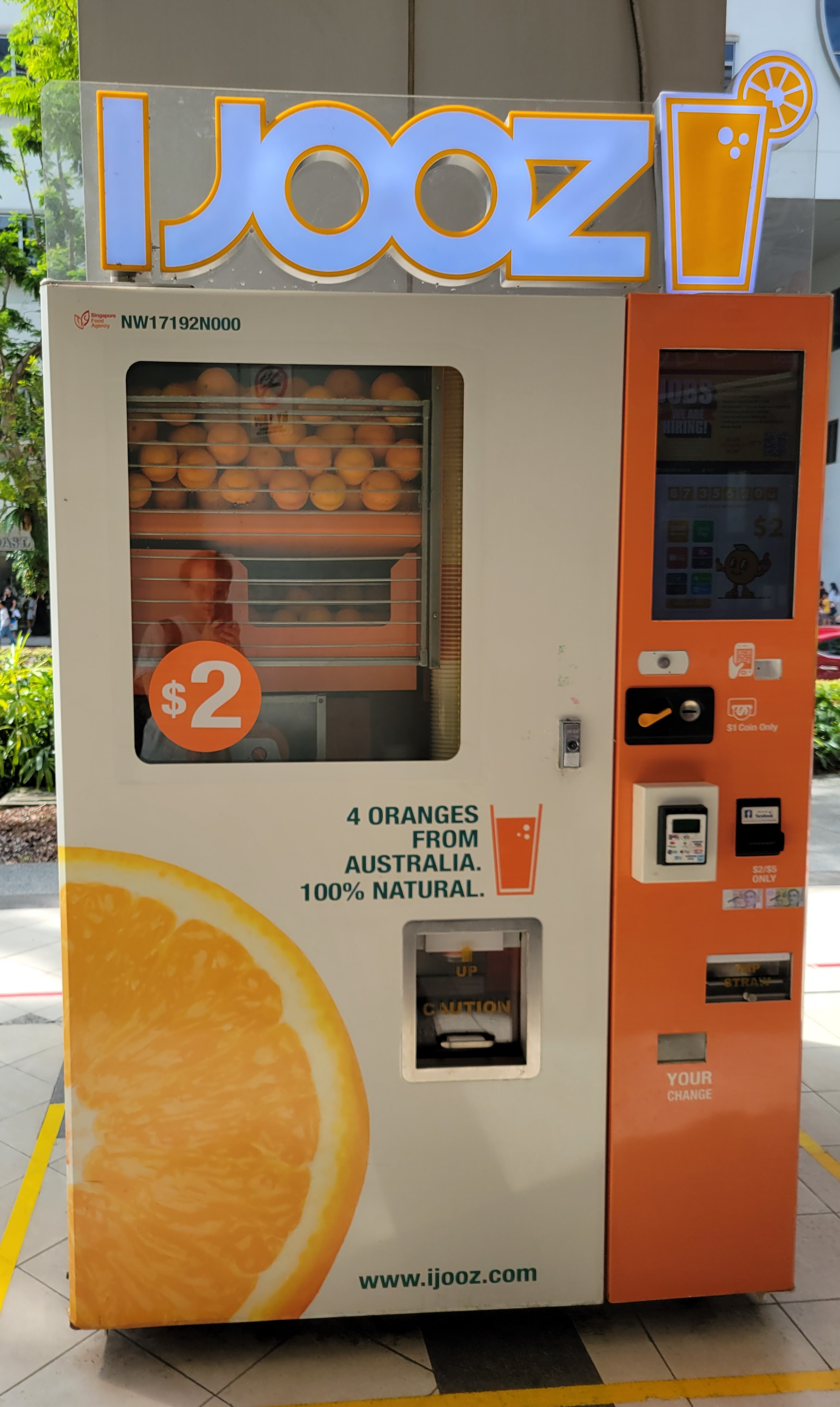
- An iJooz vending machine
- Type: Private
- Industry: Food and drink industry
- Founded: June 2016; 10 years ago in Singapore
- Founder: Bruce Zhang
- Area served: 32 countries as of 2025, including Singapore and Japan
- Products: Orange juice
- Website: www.ijooz.com

iJooz, stylised IJOOZ, is a brand of vending machine selling orange juice. It was founded in Singapore in 2016 by entrepreneur Bruce Zhang. It has expanded internationally to 32 countries, such as Japan, and plans to further expand to places such as New York City.

== Origin and expansion ==
iJooz was founded in Singapore by Bruce Zhang in June 2016. Zhang worked in the semiconductor industry for 12 years, which motivated him to create a solution for the challenges that traditional retail face, such as labour and cost. He chose to sell orange juice, as he believed that oranges are an internationally familiar flavour. The company also sells and leases machines to others.

An iJooz automated fresh juice vending machine (right) alongside a QBjooze juice vending machine (left)

After launching in 2016, the company operated just over 20 machines in Singapore over a year, focusing more on research and development instead. He originally invested about S$1 million in the company. Growth was paused during 2020 to 2022 due to the COVID-19 pandemic. In 2024, it garnered a profit of US$2.5 million. As of 2025, the company operated 1,500 vending machines in Singapore, and operated an additional 100 machines every month in Singapore.

iJooz receives competition from other vending machines that sell juice, such as Fresh & Pure, a sugarcane juice vending machine launched in 2020 that was inspired by iJooz, and Hale Smoothies, a smoothie vending machine. By 2025, Q Orange, an orange juice vending machine competitor, had left the market, after videos of flies in the vending machine were posted in 2020 and mouldy oranges were found in 2021.

== International expansion ==
In 2019, it started expanding internationally, focusing on Japan in 2023 and 2024 as its first country. As of 2025, it is present in 32 countries, such as Malaysia, Thailand, Australia and Switzerland. Zhang hopes to make an initial public offering in the United States by 2027. He hopes to first expand to New York City in the United States.

=== In Japan ===
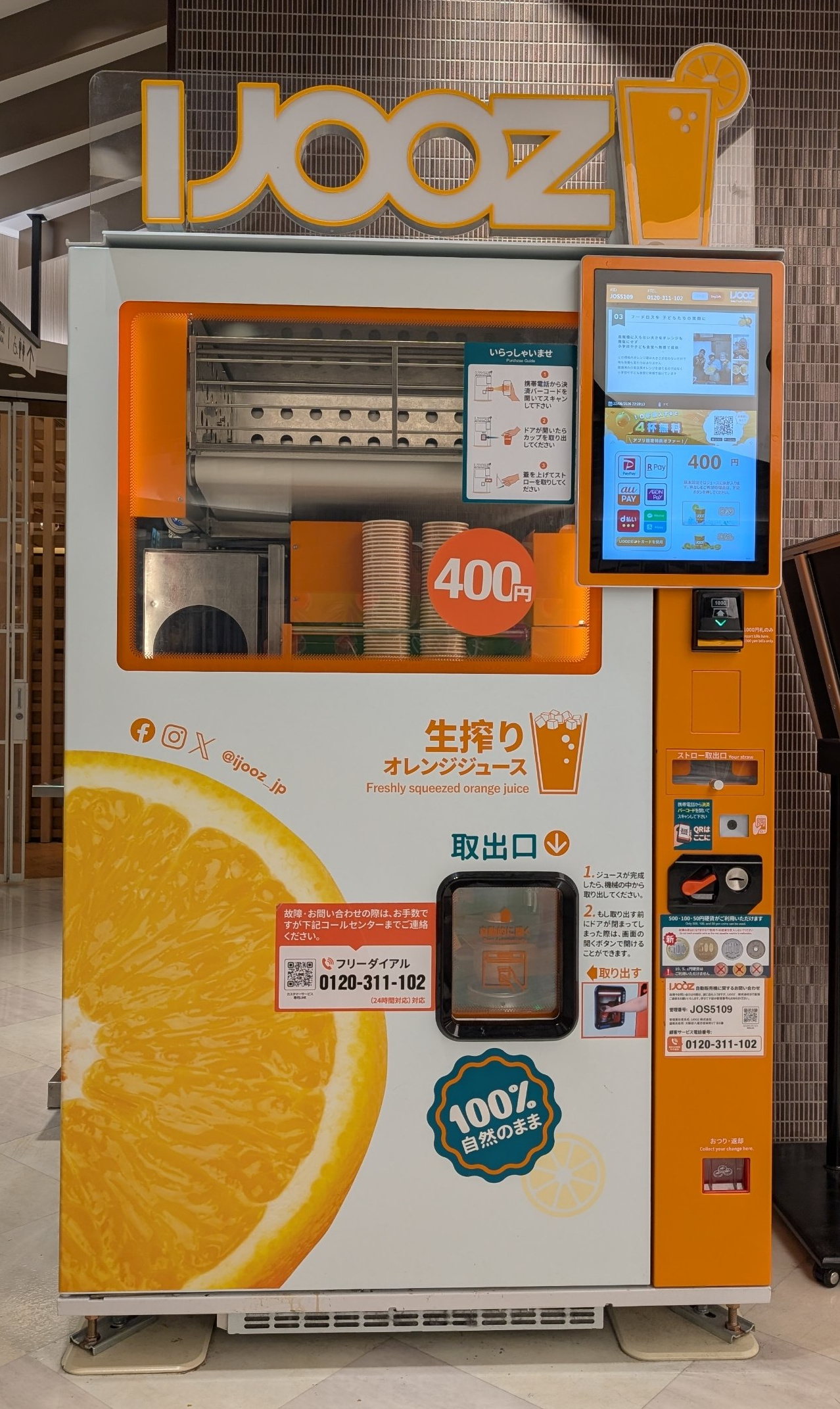
iJooz machine in Okayama, Japan

As of 2025, it operated 1300 machines in Japan, such as in Tokyo and Osaka, after expanding during a period of orange juice shortage due to a hurricane in Florida, turning profitable in April 2024. The company plans to grow and establish 100,000 machines in Japan.

Feed ME Orange machine in Kawasaki, Japan

In July 2021, Feed ME Orange (フィード・ミー・オレンジ), another orange juice vending machine company, established by ME Group Japan, a subsidiary of ME Group International, entered the Japanese market. iJooz had not entered the market yet, and had created vending machines for ME Group Japan, before becoming competitors in April 2023 by entering the market themselves due to the strong demand. ME Group Japan stopped buying machines from iJooz as a result.

== Product ==
iJooz machines are set up at various locations and are ubiquitous in Singapore, such as at schools, shopping centres or Mass Rapid Transit stations. The number of oranges used depends on their sizes, ranging from three to four. Some vending machines offer ice and others serve pulp with the orange juice, but most machines do not. Some vending machines operate a pantry system for offices, offering different food items. The company considered to increase variation in their drinks in Japan, such as using carbonation.

The temperature of the machine is kept at 4 °C, for hygiene purposes. The vending machines can be accessed remotely to correct technological errors, and have information tracking such as the remaining number of oranges and straws.

In 2025, most cups cost S$2 in Singapore, but some cost S$3 due to landlord requirements, while they cost 350 yen in Japan.

== Criticism ==
The orange juice product has drawn criticism from several nutritionists. Loh Win Nie, a nutritionist from Temasek Polytechnic, says that eating unsqueezed oranges with dietary fibre contains fewer calories and sates one's hunger more effectively; drinking orange juice may instead lead to over-consumption of calories. Heng Kiang Soon, an applied science lecturer at Republic Polytechnic, says that the nutrients are also lost in the pulp and excess waste is created, since most of iJooz's machines opt for juicing via cold-pressing instead of blending.

== Incidents ==
=== Stealing ===
On February 24, 2019, Lee Zhi Hao, a 28-year-old Malaysian, stole a total of S$2,354 from eight vending machines such as Fortune Centre and Parklane Mall. He used the money to pay his debts. He worked for Fruits Vending, which operated iJooz vending machines. He was arrested on 20 March, and sentenced to nine weeks of jail time on 8 April.

=== Straw-licking ===
On March 12, 2026, Didier Gaspard Owen Maximilien, an 18-year-old French student from ESSEC Business School, uploaded a video on Instagram of himself licking a straw from the iJooz vending machine at Goldhill Centre before putting it back in. He did it knowing that it would probably cause a public annoyance, according to a court investigation. He was charged with mischief. iJooz replaced all straws in the affected machine, and conducted sanitary checks. He left Singapore temporarily for three weeks for an internship to Manila as a graduation requirement while still facing charges. He was fined S$600.

== See also ==
- Sushi terrorism – similar unhygienic pranks in Japan
