= Biological cost =

In biology, the biological cost or metabolic price is a measure of the increased energy metabolism that is required to achieve a function. Drug resistance in microbiology, for instance, has a very high metabolic price, especially for antibiotic resistance.
