= Drug resistance =

Pathogen resistance to medications

Organisms, such as bacteria or fungi, can mutate and become insensitive to medications that previously were effective in controlling the organisms.

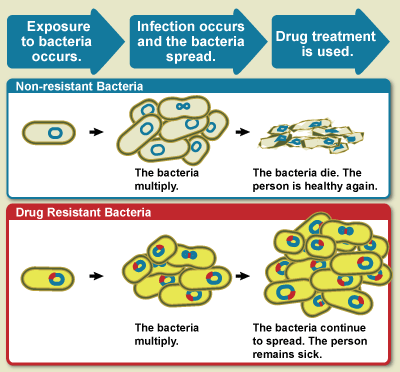
An illustrative diagram explaining drug resistance.

Drug resistance is the reduction in effectiveness of a medication such as an antimicrobial or an antineoplastic in treating a disease or condition. The term is used in the context of resistance that pathogens or cancers have "acquired", that is, resistance has evolved. Antimicrobial resistance (AMR) and antineoplastic resistance challenge clinical care and drive research. When an organism is resistant to more than one drug, it is said to be multidrug-resistant.

The development of antibiotic resistance in particular stems from the drugs targeting only specific bacterial molecules (almost always proteins). Because the drug is so specific, any mutation in these molecules will interfere with or negate its destructive effect, resulting in antibiotic resistance. Furthermore, there is mounting concern over the abuse of antibiotics in the farming of livestock, which in the European Union alone accounts for three times the volume dispensed to humans – leading to development of super-resistant bacteria.

Bacteria are capable of not only altering the enzyme targeted by antibiotics, but also, by the use of enzymes, modifying the antibiotic itself and thus neutralizing it. Examples of target-altering pathogens are Staphylococcus aureus, vancomycin-resistant enterococci and macrolide-resistant Streptococcus, while examples of antibiotic-modifying microbes are Pseudomonas aeruginosa and aminoglycoside-resistant Acinetobacter baumannii.

In short, the lack of concerted effort by governments and the pharmaceutical industry, together with the innate capacity of microbes to develop resistance at a rate that outpaces development of new drugs, suggests that existing strategies for developing viable, long-term anti-microbial therapies are ultimately doomed to failure. Without alternative strategies, the acquisition of drug resistance by pathogenic microorganisms looms as possibly one of the most significant public health threats facing humanity in the 21st century. Some of the best alternative sources to reduce the chance of antibiotic resistance are probiotics, prebiotics, dietary fibers, enzymes, organic acids, phytogenics.

Escherichia coli, S. aureus, Klebsiella pneumoniae, Streptococcus pneumoniae, A. baumannii, and P. aeruginosa were the six main causes (73%) of AMR-associated mortality in 2019, according to the 2022 Global Burden of Disease research. AMR not only causes death and disability, but it also has high financial expenses. AMR may lead to US$ 1 trillion in higher healthcare expenses by 2050 and US$ 1 trillion to US$ 3.4 trillion in annual GDP losses by 2030, according to World Bank estimations.

== Types ==
Drug, toxin, or chemical resistance is a consequence of evolution and is a response to pressures imposed on any living organism. Individual organisms vary in their sensitivity to the drug used, and some with greater fitness may be capable of surviving drug treatment. Drug-resistant traits are accordingly inherited by subsequent offspring, resulting in a population that is more drug-resistant. Unless the drug used makes sexual reproduction or cell-division or horizontal gene transfer impossible in the entire target population, resistance to the drug will inevitably follow. This can be seen in cancerous tumors where some cells may develop resistance to the drugs used in chemotherapy. Chemotherapy causes fibroblasts near tumors to produce large amounts of the protein WNT16B. This protein stimulates the growth of cancer cells which are drug-resistant. MicroRNAs have also been shown to affect acquired drug resistance in cancer cells and this can be used for therapeutic purposes. In 2012, malaria became a resurgent threat in Southeast Asia and sub-Saharan Africa, and drug-resistant strains of Plasmodium falciparum pose massive problems for health authorities. Leprosy has shown an increasing resistance to dapsone.

A rapid process of sharing resistance exists among single-celled organisms, and is termed horizontal gene transfer in which there is a direct exchange of genes, particularly in the biofilm state. A similar asexual method is used by fungi and is called "parasexuality". Examples of drug-resistant strains are to be found in microorganisms such as bacteria and viruses, parasites both endo- and ecto-, plants, fungi, arthropods, mammals, birds, reptiles, fish, and amphibians.

In the domestic environment, drug-resistant strains of organism may arise from seemingly safe activities such as the use of bleach, tooth-brushing and mouthwashing, the use of antibiotics, disinfectants and detergents, shampoos, and soaps, particularly antibacterial soaps, hand-washing, surface sprays, application of deodorants, sunblocks and any cosmetic or health-care product, insecticides, and dips. The chemicals contained in these preparations, besides harming beneficial organisms, may intentionally or inadvertently target organisms that have the potential to develop resistance.

== Mechanisms ==
The four main mechanisms by which microorganisms exhibit resistance to antimicrobials are:

1. Drug inactivation or modification: e.g., enzymatic deactivation of Penicillin G in some penicillin-resistant bacteria through the production of β-lactamases.
2. Alteration of target site: e.g., alteration of PBP — the binding target site of penicillins — in MRSA and other penicillin-resistant bacteria.
3. Alteration of metabolic pathway: e.g., some sulfonamide-resistant bacteria do not require para-aminobenzoic acid (PABA), an important precursor for the synthesis of folic acid and nucleic acids in bacteria inhibited by sulfonamides. Instead, like mammalian cells, they turn to utilizing preformed folic acid.
4. Reduced drug accumulation: by decreasing drug permeability and/or increasing active efflux (pumping out) of the drugs across the cell surface.

=== Mechanisms of acquired drug resistance ===
| Mechanism | Antimicrobial Agent | Drug Action | Mechanism of Resistance |
|---|---|---|---|
| Destroy drug | Aminoglycoside Beta-lactam antibiotics (penicillin and cephalosporin) Chloramphenicol | Binds to 30S Ribosome subunit, inhibiting protein synthesis Binds to penicillin-binding proteins, Inhibiting peptidoglycan synthesis Bind to 50S ribosome subunit, inhibiting formation of peptide bonds | Plasmid encode enzymes that chemically alter the drug (e.g., by acetylation or phosphorylation), thereby inactivating it. Plasmid encode beta-lactamase, which open the beta-lactam ring, inactivating it. Plasmid encode an enzyme that acetylate the drug, thereby inactivating it. |
| Alters drug target | Aminoglycosides Beta-lactam antibiotics (penicillin and cephalosporin) Erythromycin Quinolones Rifampin Trimethoprim | Binds to 30S Ribosome subunit, inhibiting protein synthesis Binds to penicillin-binding proteins, Inhibiting peptidoglycan synthesis Bind to 50S ribosome subunit, inhibiting protein synthesis Binds to DNA topoisomerase, an enzyme essential for DNA synthesis Binds to the RNA polymerase; inhibiting initiation of RNA synthesis Inhibit the enzyme dihydrofolate reduces, blocking the folic acid pathway | Bacteria make an altered 30S ribosomes that does not bind to the drug. Bacteria make an altered penicillin-binding proteins, that do not bind to the drug. Bacteria make a form of 50S ribosome that does not binds to the drug. Bacteria make an altered DNA topoisomerase that does not binds to the drug. Bacteria make an altered polymerase that does not binds to the drug. Bacteria make an altered enzyme that does not binds to the drug. |
| Inhibits drug entry or removes drug | Penicillin Erythromycin Tetracycline | Binds to penicillin-binding proteins, Inhibiting peptidoglycan synthesis Bind to 50S ribosome subunit, inhibiting protein synthesis Binds to 30S Ribosome subunit, inhibiting protein synthesis by blocking tRNA | Bacteria change shape of the outer membrane porin proteins, preventing drug from entering cell. New membrane transport system prevent drug from entering cell. New membrane transport system pumps drug out of cell. |

CRISPR-mediated resistance evolution

Clustered regularly interspaced short palindromic repeats (CRISPR) and associated Cas proteins constitute an adaptive immune system in bacteria and archaea, providing resistance against invading genetic elements such as bacteriophages and plasmids. CRISPR-mediated immunity can indirectly influence antimicrobial resistance evolution by limiting the acquisition of resistance genes carried on mobile genetic elements. However, under selective pressure, CRISPR systems can also evolve rapidly, facilitating adaptive responses to environmental stressors, including antibiotic exposure. Experimental and genomic studies indicate that CRISPR dynamics shape microbial population structure and modulate resistance evolution by balancing genome defense with horizontal gene acquisition.

== Metabolic cost ==
Biological cost is a measure of the increased energy metabolism required to achieve a function.

Drug resistance has a high metabolic price in pathogens for which this concept is relevant (bacteria, endoparasites, and tumor cells.) In viruses, an equivalent "cost" is genomic complexity. The high metabolic cost means that, in the absence of antibiotics, a resistant pathogen will have decreased evolutionary fitness as compared to susceptible pathogens. This is one of the reasons drug resistance adaptations are rarely seen in environments where antibiotics are absent. However, in the presence of antibiotics, the survival advantage conferred off-sets the high metabolic cost and allows resistant strains to proliferate.

== Treatment ==
In humans, the gene ABCB1 encodes MDR1(p-glycoprotein) which is a key transporter of medications on the cellular level. If MDR1 is overexpressed, drug resistance increases. Therefore, ABCB1 levels can be monitored. In patients with high levels of ABCB1 expression, the use of secondary treatments, like metformin, have been used in conjunction with the primary drug treatment with some success.

For antibiotic resistance, which represents a widespread problem nowadays, drugs designed to block the mechanisms of bacterial antibiotic resistance are used. For example, bacterial resistance against beta-lactam antibiotics (such as penicillin and cephalosporins) can be circumvented by using antibiotics such as nafcillin that are not susceptible to destruction by certain beta-lactamases (the group of enzymes responsible for breaking down beta-lactams). Beta-lactam bacterial resistance can also be dealt with by administering beta-lactam antibiotics with drugs that block beta-lactamases such as clavulanic acid so that the antibiotics can work without getting destroyed by the bacteria first. Researchers have recognized the need for new drugs that inhibit bacterial efflux pumps, which cause resistance to multiple antibiotics such as beta-lactams, quinolones, chloramphenicol, and trimethoprim by sending molecules of those antibiotics out of the bacterial cell. Sometimes a combination of different classes of antibiotics may be used synergistically; that is, they work together to effectively fight bacteria that may be resistant to one of the antibiotics alone.

Destruction of the resistant bacteria can also be achieved by phage therapy, in which a specific bacteriophage (virus that kills bacteria) is used.

=== Collateral sensitivity and evolutionary trade-offs ===
Collateral sensitivity refers to an evolutionary trade-off in which resistance to one drug increases sensitivity to another. This arises when adaptations that confer resistance carry pleiotropic costs—such as altered membrane permeability, metabolic burden, or structural changes in drug targets—creating reciprocal vulnerabilities that can be exploited therapeutically.

Experimental mapping of collateral-sensitivity profiles in bacteria has shown that resistance mutations frequently generate predictable trade-off patterns, enabling drug sequences or cycling strategies that teer microbial populations through regions of the fitness landscape where resistance is unstable or costly. These experimental evolution studies have also been used to inform optimization strategies for sequential drug application aimed at minimizing resistance emergence. However, there was low occurrence of collateral sensitivity observed in many clinical isolates worldwide, with low reproducibility even in clinical isolates under experimental testing.

In cancer systems, temporal drug exposure can induce signaling-network rewiring that generates emergent vulnerabilities. Sequential application of targeted inhibitors and genotoxic agents has been shown to reprogram apoptotic signaling networks and sensitize tumor cells to subsequent therapy. Later work demonstrated that evolving tumor cell populations may exhibit time-dependent vulnerabilities, enabling "temporal collateral sensitivity" strategies aimed at redirecting clonal evolution.

These findings motivate evolution-informed therapeutic strategies—such as sequential or alternating treatments—central to emerging approaches in evolutionary therapy.

== See also ==
- Antibiotic resistance
- Fitness landscape
- Fecal bacteriotherapy
- Mass drug administration
- Multidrug resistance
- Pharmacoepidemiology
- Physical factors affecting microbial life
- Small multidrug resistance protein
- Eleftheria terrae
