= Part-time job terrorism =

Japanese social phenomenon

Part-time job terrorism (バイトテロ, baito tero) is a Japanese social phenomenon where part-time employees perform pranks and stunts, usually to share on social media. Stunts include climbing into ice cream freezers, or "planking" on counter-tops at fast-food restaurants. Although such pranks would not be seen as shocking in many cultures, they are considered disgraceful in Japanese culture.

Such incidents emerged as a social phenomenon around the summer of 2013, but have been around in the early 2000s when internet-based Japanese news agencies such as Yukan-news recorded such an incident, with more traditional news agencies later following suit. It was termed baito tero in Japanese, as a portmanteau of the Japanese word baito (meaning "part-time job" and a loan-word from the German arbeit, meaning "work") and English word "terrorism" or "terrorist".

Japanese employers generally feel disturbed and bothered by such behavior, and penalties and punishment ranged from termination of employment to civil suits. Employees, in some circumstances, can be held financially accountable for loss of business due to the negative publicity.

While there is no single reason for the phenomenon, some news reports speculate that the prevalence of social media—particularly video-based mediums such as TikTok and Instagram—have led to an increase in baito tero.

== See also ==
- Sushi terrorism
