= Sushi Express =

Taiwanese restaurant chain

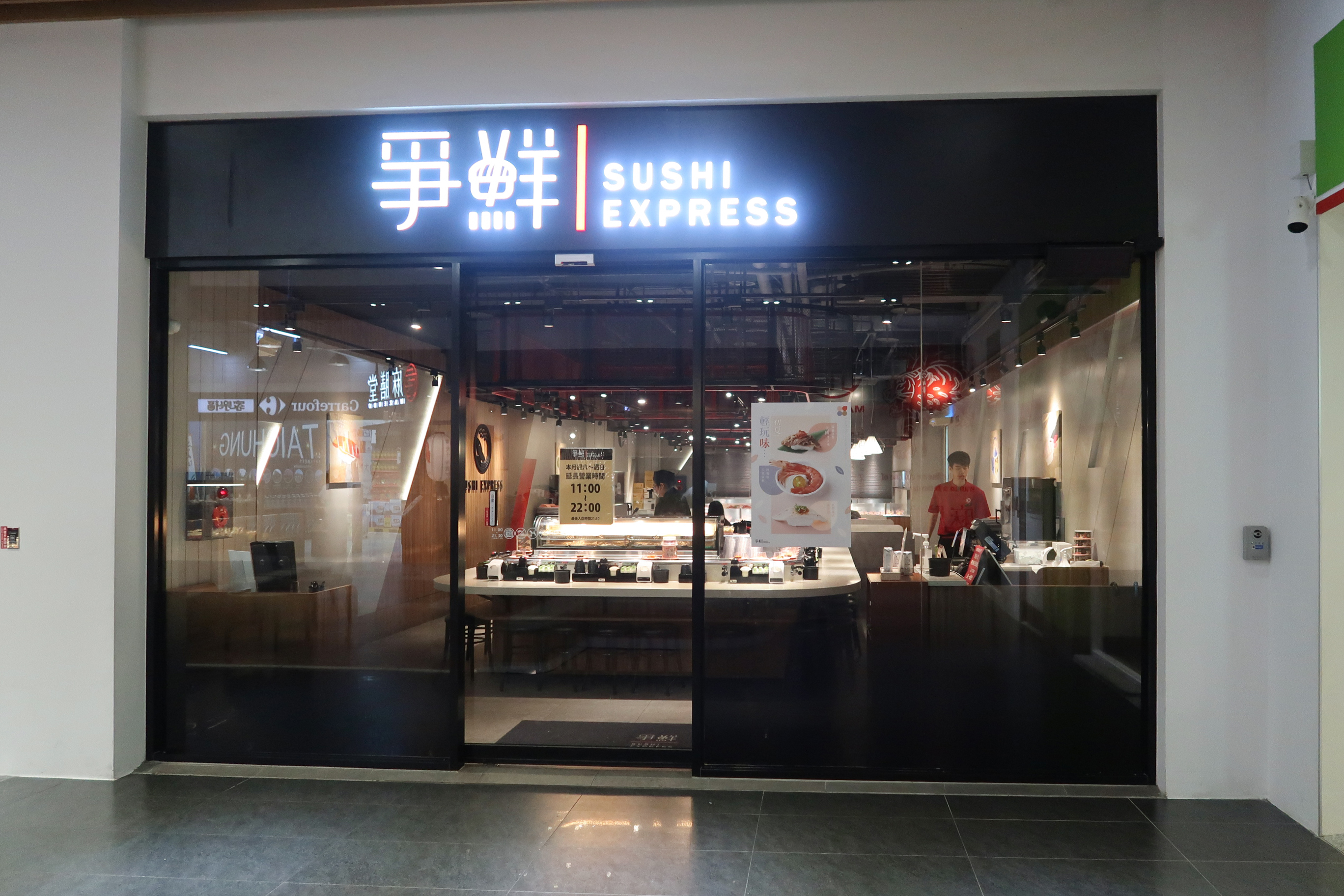
- Sushi Express at Taroko Mall in Taichung
- Type: Private
- Industry: Food and hospitality
- Founded: March 1996 in Taipei, Taiwan
- Founder: Chen Chin-Chiu (陳津秋)
- Headquarters: Taipei, Taiwan
- Areas served: Taiwan, Hong Kong, China, Singapore, Thailand
- Key people: Chen Chin-Chiu
- Products: Sushi
- Website: www.sushiexpress.com.tw

Sushi Express (Chinese: 爭鮮餐飲集團) is a Taiwanese chain restaurant group specializing in conveyor belt sushi. It was stablished in 1996 on Yongkang Street in Taipei.

== See also ==
- List of sushi restaurants
- Conveyor belt sushi
