= Small multidrug resistance protein =

Family of integral membrane proteins

Small Multidrug Resistance protein

Identifiers
- Symbol: Multi_Drug_Res
- Pfam: PF00892
- Pfam clan: CL0184
- InterPro: IPR000390
- SCOP2: 1s7b / SCOPe / SUPFAM
- TCDB: 2.A.7
- OPM superfamily: 70
- OPM protein: 5i20
Available protein structures:
- PDB: IPR000390 PF00892 (ECOD; PDBsum)
- AlphaFold: IPR000390; PF00892

Small multidrug resistance proteins (also known as drug/metabolite transporter) are a family of integral membrane proteins that confer drug resistance to a wide range of toxic compounds including guanidinium, hydrophobic drugs, antiseptics, polyamines, and glycolipids, by removing them for the cells. Within the family there are four subtypes. Small multidrug resistance proteins are characterized by four α-helical transmembrane strands. SMR proteins are some of the smallest membrane transport proteins found in nature. The efflux is coupled to an influx of protons. An example is Escherichia coli mvrC P23895 which prevents the incorporation of methyl viologen into cells and is involved in ethidium bromide efflux.

The four functional subtypes of small multidrug resistance proteins make up approximately 97% of small multidrug resistant proteins. One subtype, called GDx (Guanidinium export) transports guanidinium, which is a byproduct of the nitrogen metabolic process. The subtype Qac (Quaternary Ammonium Cation) exports hydrophobic cationic compounds. These two subtypes are relevant because they have been shown to aid in resistance to antiseptics used in human households. Another subtype (mdtI/mdtJ), is named for the genes mdtI/mdtJ, is associated with the transport of small polyamine metabolites. The subtype arnE/arnF, named for the genes arnE/arnF, transports glycolipids. Co-expressed genes can make up "paired SMRs" in all four functional subtypes. It is predicted that these paired SMRs developed through many independent duplications.

The genes that encode small multidrug resistance proteins are often found in the assessment of profiles with drug resistance. Their dual topology gives them the unique advantage to insert into a membrane in either inward or outward positions. Antimicrobials are being developed to target small multidrug resistance proteins because of the role of SMR proteins in resistance to treatment and management.
