= Physical factors affecting microbial life =

Microbes can be damaged or killed by elements of their physical environment such as temperature, radiation, or exposure to chemicals; these effects can be exploited in efforts to control pathogens, often for the purpose of food safety.

== Irradiation ==
Irradiation is the use of ionising gamma rays emitted by cobalt-60 and caesium-137, or, high-energy electrons and X-rays to inactivate microbial pathogens, particularly in the food industry. Bacteria such as Deinococcus radiodurans are particularly resistant to radiation, but are not pathogenic. Active microbes, such as Corynebacterium aquaticum, Pseudomonas putida, Comamonas acidovorans, Gluconobacter cerinus, Micrococcus diversus and Rhodococcus rhodochrous, have been retrieved from spent nuclear fuel storage pools at the Idaho National Engineering and Environmental Laboratory (INEEL). These microbes were again exposed to controlled doses of radiation. All the species survived weaker radiation doses with little damage, while only the gram-positive species survived much larger doses. The spores of gram-positive bacteria contain storage proteins that bind tightly to DNA, possibly acting as a protective barrier to radiation damage.

Ionising radiation kills cells indirectly by creating reactive free radicals. These free radicals can chemically alter sensitive macromolecules in the cell leading to their inactivation. Most of the cell's macromolecules are affected by ionising radiation, but damage to the DNA macromolecule is most often the cause of cell death, since DNA often contains only a single copy of its genes; proteins, on the other hand, often have several copies so that damage of one will not lead to cell death, and in any case may always be re-synthesized provided the DNA has remained intact. Ultraviolet radiation has been used as a germicide by both industry and medicine for more than a century (see Ultraviolet germicidal irradiation). Use of ultraviolet leads to both inactivation and the stimulating of mutations. A case study of an irradiated Escherichia coli population found a growing number of bacteriophage-resistant mutants induced by the light.

== Metal ions (Oligodynamic effect) ==
Carl Nägeli, a Swiss botanist, discovered in 1893 that the ions of various metals and their alloys such as silver and copper, but also mercury, iron, lead, zinc, bismuth, gold, aluminium and others, have a toxic effect on microbial life by denaturing microbial enzymes and thus disrupting their metabolism. This effect is negligible in viruses since they are not metabolically active.

== Pulsed electric fields (PEF) ==
Strong electric field pulses applied to cells cause their membranes to develop pores (electroporation), increasing membrane permeability with a consequent and, for the cell, undesirable migration of chemicals. Pulses of low intensity may result in the increased production of secondary metabolites and a build-up of resistance. PEF treatment is an adequate process for inactivation of microbes in acids and other thermosensitive media, but holds inherent resistance dangers because of incomplete destruction.

== Pulsed magnetic fields (PMF) ==
A 2004 study found that E. coli is susceptible to pulsed magnetic fields with a survivability figure of 1 in 10 000. As with PEF cell walls are rendered porous with resultant cell death. Enzymes such as lactoperoxidase, lipase and catalase are readily inactivated, though with varying degrees of susceptibility. A 2010 study concentrated on the effects of PMF on Staphylococcus aureus.

== High power ultrasound ==
Until recently ultrasonic systems were used for cleaning, cutting, the welding of plastics, and in medical therapy. High power ultrasound is a useful tool which is extremely versatile in its applications. Ultrasound generates cavitation bubbles within a liquid or slurry by causing the liquid molecules to vibrate. Temperatures of 5000K and pressures of up to 2000 atmospheres are routinely recorded in these bubbles. Cavitation can be produced using frequencies from the audible range up to 2 MHz, the optimum being at about 20 kHz. Generating ultrasonics requires a liquid medium and a source of ultrasound, usually from either a piezoelectric or magnetostrictive transducer. The process is used for destroying E. coli, Salmonella, Ascaris, Giardia, Cryptosporidium cysts, Cyanobacteria and Poliovirus. It is also capable of breaking down organic pesticides.

The frequencies used in diagnostic ultrasound are typically between 2 and 18 MHz, and uncertainty remains about the extent of cellular damage or long-term effects of fetal scans. (see Medical ultrasonography)

== Low temperatures ==
Freezing food to preserve its quality has been used since ancient times. Freezing temperatures curb the spoiling effect of microorganisms in food, but can also preserve some pathogens unharmed for long periods of time. Freezing kills some microorganisms by physical trauma, others are sublethally injured by freezing, and may recover to become infectious.

== High osmotic gradients ==
Syrup, honey, brine, alcohol and concentrated sugar or salt solutions display an antibacterial action due to osmotic pressure. Syrup and honey have a long history of being used as a topical treatment for superficial and deep wounds.

Wood smoke compounds act as food preservatives. Phenol and phenolic compounds found in wood smoke are antioxidants and antimicrobials, slowing bacterial growth. Other antimicrobials in wood smoke include formaldehyde, acetic acid, and other organic acids, which give wood smoke a low pH—about 2.5. Some of these compounds are toxic to people as well, and may have health effects in the quantities found in cooking applications.

== Ozone ==
Microorganisms suffer a reduction in viability on contact with ozone which compromises the integrity of their cell walls. Gram-negative bacteria are more vulnerable to ozone than gram-positive organisms.

== High temperatures ==
(see Thermization and Pasteurisation)
Extreme temperatures destroy viruses and vegetative cells that are active and metabolising. Organic molecules such as proteins, carbohydrates, lipid and nucleic acids, as well as cell walls and membranes, all of which play important roles in cell metabolism, are damaged by excessive heat. Food for human consumption is routinely heated by baking, boiling and frying to temperatures which destroy most pathogens. Thermal processes often cause undesirable changes in the texture, appearance and nutritional value of foods. Autoclaves generate steam at higher than boiling point and are used to sterilise laboratory glassware, surgical instruments, and, in a growing industry, medical waste. A danger inherent in using high temperatures to destroy microbes, is their incomplete destruction through inadequate procedures with a consequent risk of producing pathogens resistant to heat.

== High pressures ==
(see Pascalization)
Water under very high hydrostatic pressure of up to 700 MPa (100,000 psi) inactivates pathogens such as Listeria, E. coli and Salmonella. High pressure processing (HPP) is preferred over heat treatment in the food industry as it eliminates changes in the quality of foods due to thermal degradation, resulting in fresher taste, texture, appearance and nutrition. Processing conveniently takes place at ambient or refrigeration temperatures.

The question whether pressure is an impediment to (microbial) life is surprisingly opposite what has been assumed for a long time. Anurag Sharma, a geochemist, James Scott, a microbiologist, and others at the Carnegie Institution of Washington performed an experiment with Diamond Anvil Cell and utilized "direct observations" on microbial activity to over 1.0 Gigapascal pressures.

Their goal was to test microbes and discover under what level of pressure they can carry out life processes. The experiments were performed up to 1.6 GPa of pressure, which is more than 16,000 times Earth's surface pressure (Earth's surface pressure is 985 hPa). The experiment began by placing a solution of bacteria, specifically Escherichia coli and Shewanella oneidensis, in a film and placing it in the DAC. The pressure was then raised to 1.6 GPa. When raised to this pressure and kept there for 30 hours, at least 1% of the bacteria survived. The experimenters then added a dye to the solution and also monitored formate metabolism using in-situ Raman spectroscopy. If the cells survived the squeezing and were capable of carrying out life processes, specifically breaking down formate, the dye would turn clear. 1.6 GPa is such great pressure that during the experiment the DAC turned the solution into ice-IV, a room-temperature ice. When the bacteria broke down the formate in the ice, liquid pockets would form because of the chemical reaction. The bacteria were also able to cling to the surface of the DAC with their tails.

There was some skepticism recorded with this pioneering experiment. According to Art Yayanos, an oceanographer at the Scripps Institute of Oceanography in La Jolla, California, an organism should only be considered living if it can reproduce. Another issue with the DAC experiment is that when high pressures occur, there are usually high temperatures present as well, but in this experiment there were not. This experiment was performed at room-temperature. However, the intentional lack of high temperature in the experiments isolated the actual effects of pressure on life and results clearly indicated life to be largely pressure insensitive.

Newer results from independent research groups have shown the validity of Sharma et al. (2002) work. This is a significant step that reiterates the need for a new approach to the old problem of studying environmental extremes through experiments. Many scientists do not debate whether microbial life can survive pressures up to 600 MPa, which has been shown over the last decade or so to be valid through a number of scattered publications. What is significant in this approach of Sharma et al. 2002 work is the straightforward ability to monitor systems at extreme conditions that have since remained technically inaccessible. While many find the experiment impressive, the results are not unexpected and are consistent with most biophysical models. This novel approach lays a foundation for future work on microbiology at non-ambient conditions by not only providing a scientific premise, but also laying the technical feasibility for future work on non-ambient biology and organic systems.

== High acceleration ==
Bacterial cell surfaces may be damaged by the acceleration forces attained in centrifuges. Laboratory centrifuges routinely achieve 5000–15000g, a procedure which often kills a considerable portion of microbes, especially if they are in their exponential growth phase.

== See also ==
- Drug resistance
- Food preservation
