= Cold-pressed juice =

Juice extracted by hydraulic press

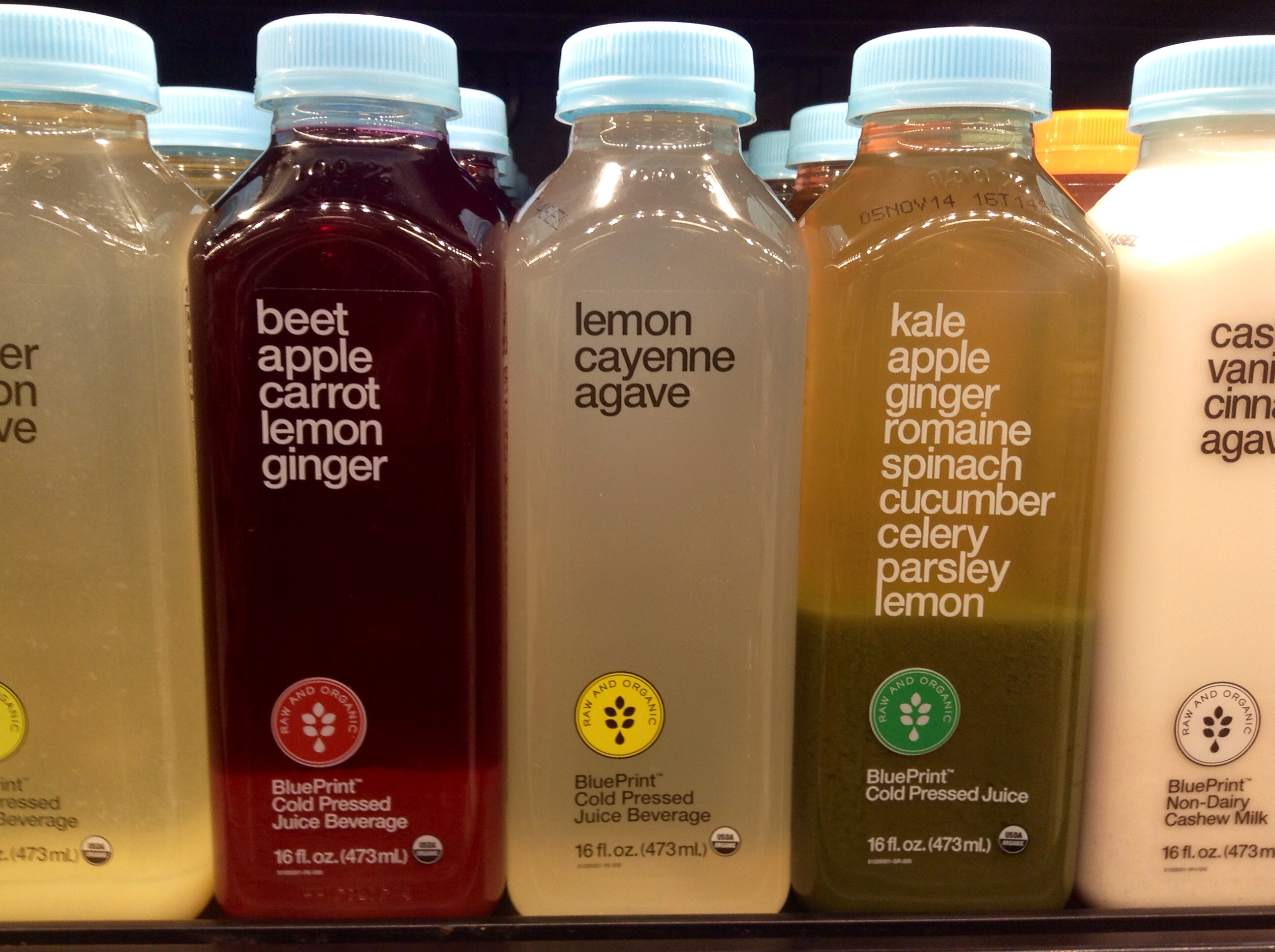
Cold-pressed juices

Cold-pressed juice is juice that uses a hydraulic press to extract juice from fruit and vegetables, as opposed to other methods such as centrifugal or single auger.

Without pasteurization or high-pressure processing (HPP), cold-pressed juices can be stored in a refrigerator for up to three days when phytochemical and micronutrient degradation occurs. Some juicers use technology that helps delay oxidation which can allow for slightly longer storage in refrigerators. This type of juice has been commercially produced for decades, but became more common in some countries since 2013. In general, these juices are more expensive than other types of juices, as they are made from 100% fruit and vegetables without any added ingredients.

== History ==
Although cold-pressed juices were produced over several decades, the products gained more common use during the fad of juice "cleansing", expanding into a wider industry in the early 21st century.

== Manufacturing process ==
Making cold-pressed juice is a two-step process. The first stage is to shred or compress the fruits or vegetables into a pulp. In industrial production, the shredding process uses a steel rotating disc. Produce is loaded into a large hopper feeding tube and typically falls into a filter bag. The second process is the hydraulic press; this exposes the shredded produce to extreme pressures between two plates. The pressure causes the juice and water content from the produce to drip into a collection tray below, leaving behind the fibre content in the filter bag. The pomace left behind is generally composted, recycled in food products or discarded.

The industry standard hydraulic cold-press technology with vertical pressing layers was invented by Dale E. Wettlaufer in 1983. Vertical press layers with open-top cloth bags allow for faster loading and emptying of the press, compared to the classic rack-and-cloth method which involved wrapping layers of ground fruit in cloth.

After extracting juice from fruits and vegetables, the juice may be consumed raw, or the manufacturer may choose to put the juice through a preservation method such as HPP or pasteurization to extend shelf life and kill potentially harmful microorganisms. Pasteurization or HPP allows the juice to be stored for about 30 days. Without pasteurization, as for typical home-made juices stored in a refrigerator, significant degradation of phytochemicals and micronutrients occurs within 6 days.

== Industry ==
Starting with Liquiteria in 1996, cold-pressed juice bars first emerged in New York City and have since spread internationally. Though the size of the cold-pressed juice industry is not independently tracked, the 2013 estimates ranged from US$1.6 billion to US$3.4 billion.

== Nutrient preservation ==
There is no consensus on the nutritional benefits of cold-pressed juices as compared to conventional juices. Some studies show that cold-pressing preserves the contents of phytochemicals or micronutrients compared to conventional centrifugal juicing or blending.^{6} and that cold-pressed microgreen juices were a 'rich source of bioactive compounds' ^{7} Other studies disagree and conclude that color and physicochemical composition, including polyphenols, carotenoids, and vitamin C were not different among juices of various tropical fruits prepared using a cold-press instrument, a centrifugal juicer or a blender.

== High cost ==
Cold-pressed juices could cost US$10 for a 16-ounce (473ml) bottle, and as high as US$12 for a 12-ounce (355ml) bottle. The high cost has been attributed to the manufacturing process, which uses an HPP machine that may cost from US$800,000 to over US$2 million. Alternatively, the incremental cost of toll processing could range from US$0.25–US$0.45 per bottle, not including transport.

== Laws and regulations ==
There are laws and regulations governing the production and distribution of raw juice that vary widely by region. In the United States, the US Food and Drug Administration prohibits wholesale distribution of raw juice, stating that it may only be sold directly to consumers. To sell juice wholesale, the juice must undergo a process that achieves a "5 log reduction in bacterial plate count." The process must reduce the amount of microorganisms by 100,000 times. There are several processes available that can achieve a 5-log reduction, including heat pasteurization and ultraviolet light filtering, but the most common process in the cold-pressed juice industry is HPP.

Juice manufacturers may also have to organize an approved HACCP (Hazard Analysis and Critical Control Points) plan. In a HACCP plan, the manufacturer must identify at which points in the manufacturing process the juice may become contaminated, and how to regularly test and confirm that the juice is not being contaminated. The manufacturer must keep log books available for health inspectors if requested.

Nutritional labeling requirements must be followed in some regions, including the US, where the nutrition facts label must state nutritional content, ingredients and the manufacturer.

== See also ==
- Fruit press
- Pascalization
