= Pingtung =

Pingtung may refer to:

- Pingtung City, the capital of Pingtung County, Taiwan
- Pingtung County, a county of Taiwan

== See also ==
- Pingtung Plain, a plain in Pingtung and Kaohsiung in Taiwan
- Pingtung Airport (ICAO code: RCSQ; IATA code: PIF), an airport with two airfields in Pingtung, Taiwan
- Pingtung Station, a rail station in Pingtung, Taiwan
- Pingtung Line, a rail line from Kaouhsiung to Pingtung in Taiwan
- Pingtung Baseball Field
- Tung Ping Chau (Tung Ping Island), in Hong Kong
- Ping (disambiguation)
- Tung (disambiguation)
