= SPRY4-IT1 =

Non-coding RNA found in humans

Identifiers
- Aliases: SPRY4-IT1, SPRIGHTLY, SPRY4 intronic transcript 1
- External IDs: OMIM: 617617; GeneCards: SPRY4-IT1
Orthologs
Databases	NCBI: entry; OMA: entry
Species	Human	Mouse
Entrez	100642175	n/a
Ensembl	ENSG00000281881	n/a
UniProt	n a	n/a
RefSeq (mRNA)	n/a	n/a
RefSeq (protein)	n/a	n/a
Location (UCSC)	n/a	n/a
PubMed search		n/a
- Wikidata
View/Edit Human

SPRY4-IT1 is a long non-coding RNA which is located within an intron of the SPRY4 gene. Its expression is upregulated in melanoma cells, where it is expressed in the cytoplasm. Removal of its expression by RNAi causes defects in cell-growth and differentiation and increased rates of apoptosis, suggesting that it may have a role in melanoma development.

== See also ==
- Long noncoding RNA
