= Conveyor belt sushi =

Restaurant where sushi is placed on a looping conveyor belt

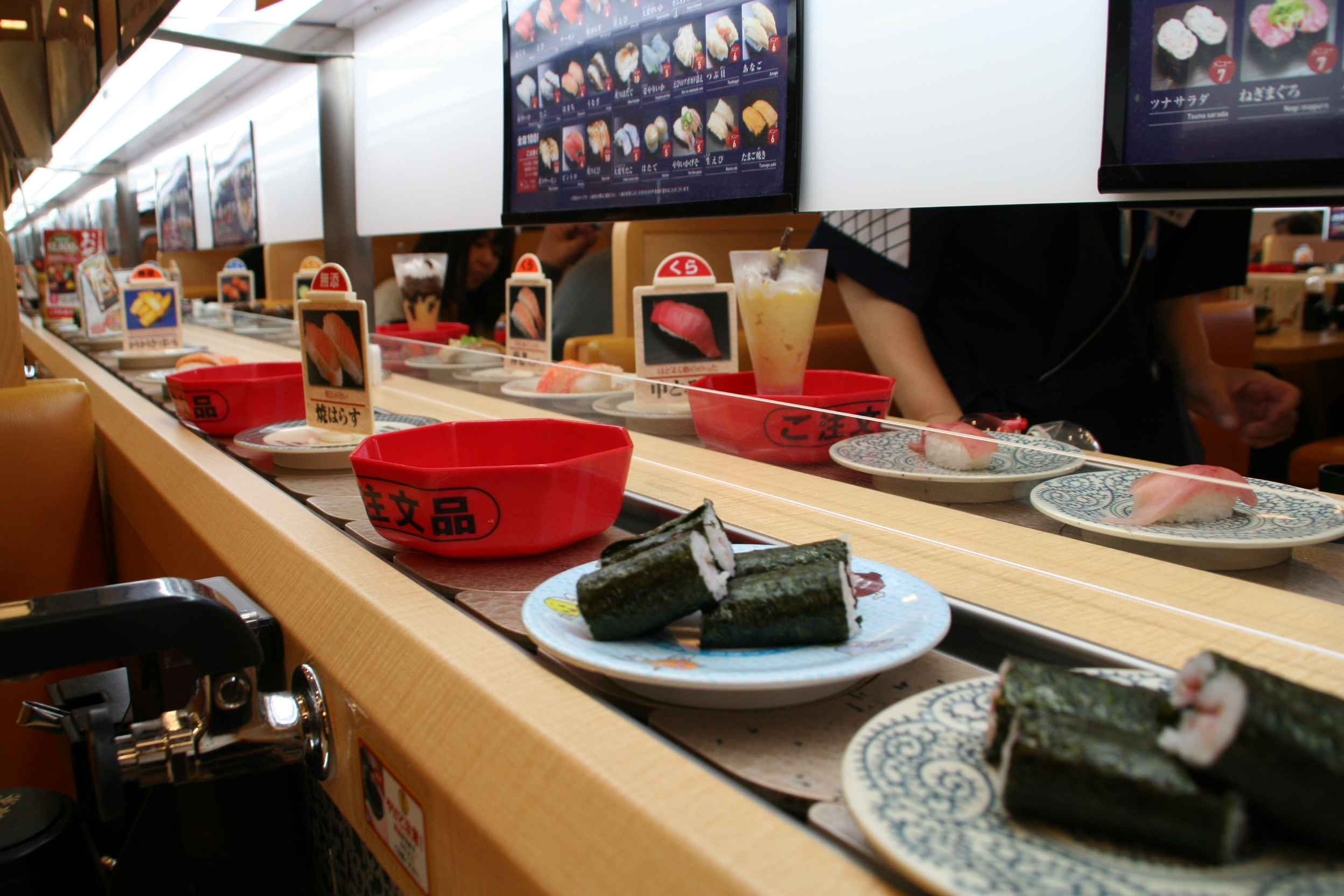
Customer's view at a conveyor belt sushi restaurant

Conveyor belt sushi (Japanese: 回転寿司, Hepburn: kaiten-zushi), also called revolving sushi or rotation sushi, is a type of sushi restaurant common in Japan. In Australasia, it is also known as a sushi train.

Plates serving the sushi are placed on a rotating conveyor belt that winds through the restaurant and moves past every table, counter and seat. The final bill is based on the number and type of plates of the consumed sushi. Some restaurants use a variation of the concept, such as miniature wooden "sushi boats" that travel through small canals, or miniature train cars that travel on a track.

== Restaurants ==
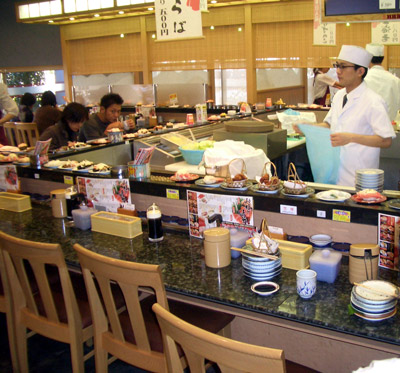
A conveyor belt sushi restaurant in Kagoshima, Japan

The distinguishing feature of conveyor belt sushi is the stream of plates winding through the restaurant. The selection is usually not limited to sushi; it may also include karaage, edamame, salad, soup, fruits, desserts, and other foods and drinks.

Some restaurants have RFID tags or other systems in place to remove sushi that has rotated for too long.

=== Special orders ===
If customers cannot find their desired sushi or dish, they can make special orders. Sometimes speaker phones are available for this purpose above the conveyor belt, while more modern restaurants use a touchscreen display or tablet for this purpose. If a small quantity of food is ordered, it is placed on the conveyor belt but marked so other customers know that this dish was ordered by someone; usually the plate with the sushi sits on a labeled cylindrical stand to indicate that this is a special order. Some restaurants use a secondary belt for this purpose, or have an automated delivery tray that will send a special order directly to where a customer is sitting. For large orders the dishes may also be brought to the customer by an attendant.

Condiments and utensils are usually found near the seats, such as wasabi, pickled ginger, chopsticks, soy sauce, and small dishes for the soy sauce. Self-served tea and ice water is usually complimentary, with cups stacked on a shelf above the conveyor belt and teabags or green tea powder in a storage container on the table. Some restaurants offer a hot water faucet at the tables to make tea. On the shelves are usually wet paper towels and plastic boxes to store sushi for take-out customers.

=== Billing ===
The bill is calculated by counting the number and type of plates of the consumed sushi. Plates with different colors, patterns, or shapes have different prices, usually ranging from 100 yen to 500 yen or the local equivalent (for example, a conveyor belt sushi restaurant in Iceland may offer a price range of 250 to 480 krónur). The cost of each plate is shown on signboards or posters in the restaurant. In general, cheap items come on plain plates, and the level of plate decoration is related to the price. The most expensive items tend to come on gold colored plates. Expensive items may be placed on two plates, with the price being the sum of the prices of the individual plates. Some conveyor belt sushi restaurant chains, such as Kappa Sushi or Otaru Zushi, have a fixed price of 100 yen for every plate. This is similar to the phenomenon of 100-yen shops. A button above the conveyor belt can be used to call the attendants to count the plates. Some restaurants have a counting machine where the customer drops the plates to be counted automatically, or they use RFID tagged plates and just count each stack at once with a special reader.

=== Conveyor operation ===
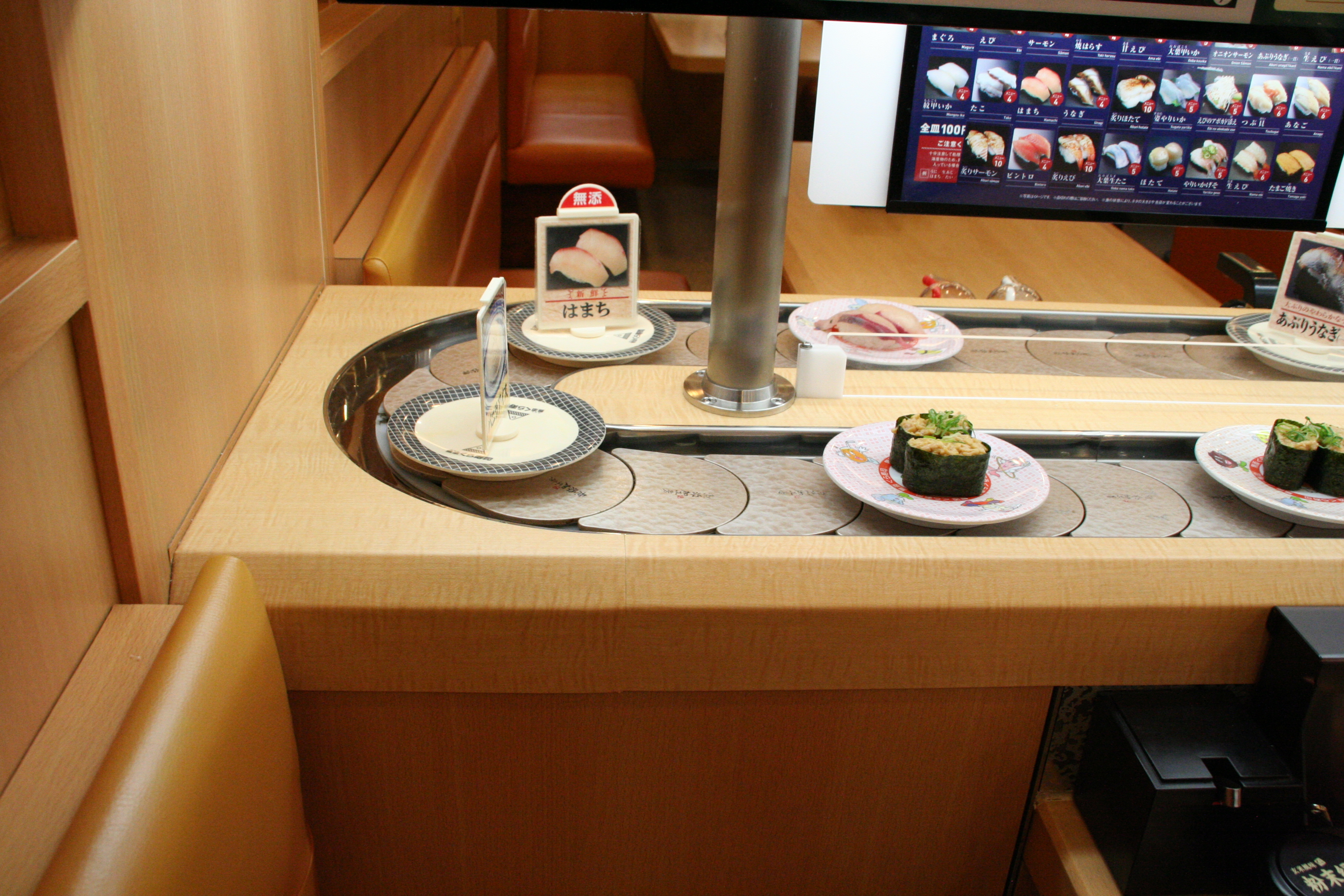
A sushi conveyor chain articulating around a tight corner

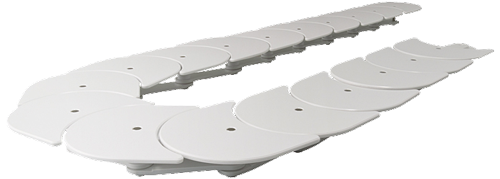
R Roller type (TORP) plastic top chain by Tsubaki frequently used in conveyor sushi restaurants

The sushi conveyor consists of a thin, narrow conveyor designed to fit within the tight confines of a sushi restaurant. Nearly 100% of sushi conveyors made in Japan are manufactured in Ishikawa Prefecture.

The standard conveyor uses a specially designed plastic crescent top chain. The chain actually runs on its side (on its link plates), with the crescent plate attached to the other side plate by means of a snap pin. This gives the chain a very small bending radius and allows the conveyor to make the tight corners found in most conveyor belt sushi restaurants. Further, the horizontal layout means that there is no return side of the chain, which not only eliminates chain sag and sliding with the roller, but allows for a much shallower design.

Major chain companies can offer different pin materials (stainless steel being common), plate shapes, surface treatments, and so on depending on the individual application. Many customers are also turning to sushi conveyor manufacturers for custom-designed plates to go with their conveyor. Innovations in sushi conveyors include chainless designs for quieter operation and design/layout freedom, multi-tiered conveyors to allow for more sushi to be displayed in limited spaces, and high speed lanes for custom orders.

== History ==
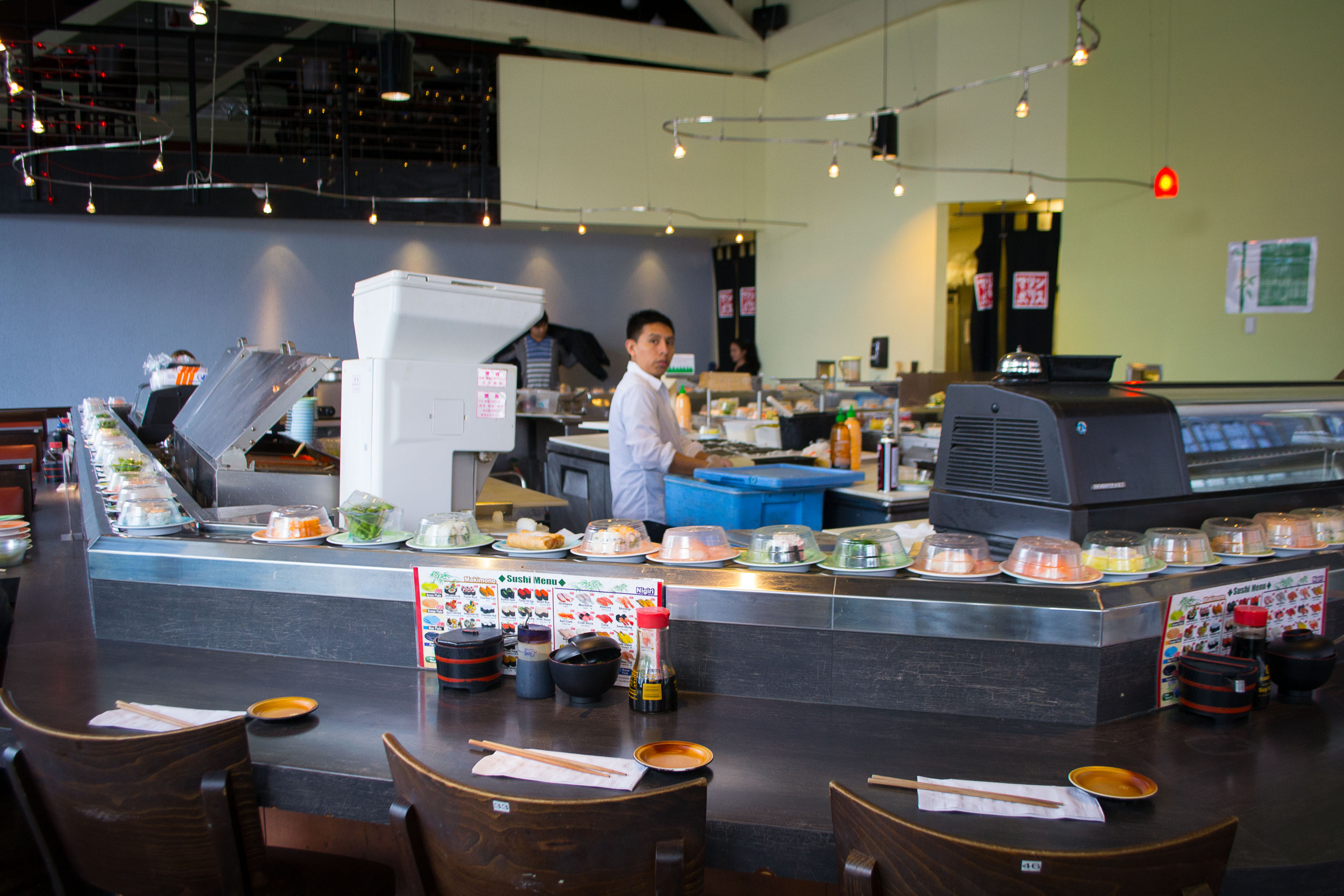
A conveyor belt sushi restaurant in Pearl District, Portland, Oregon

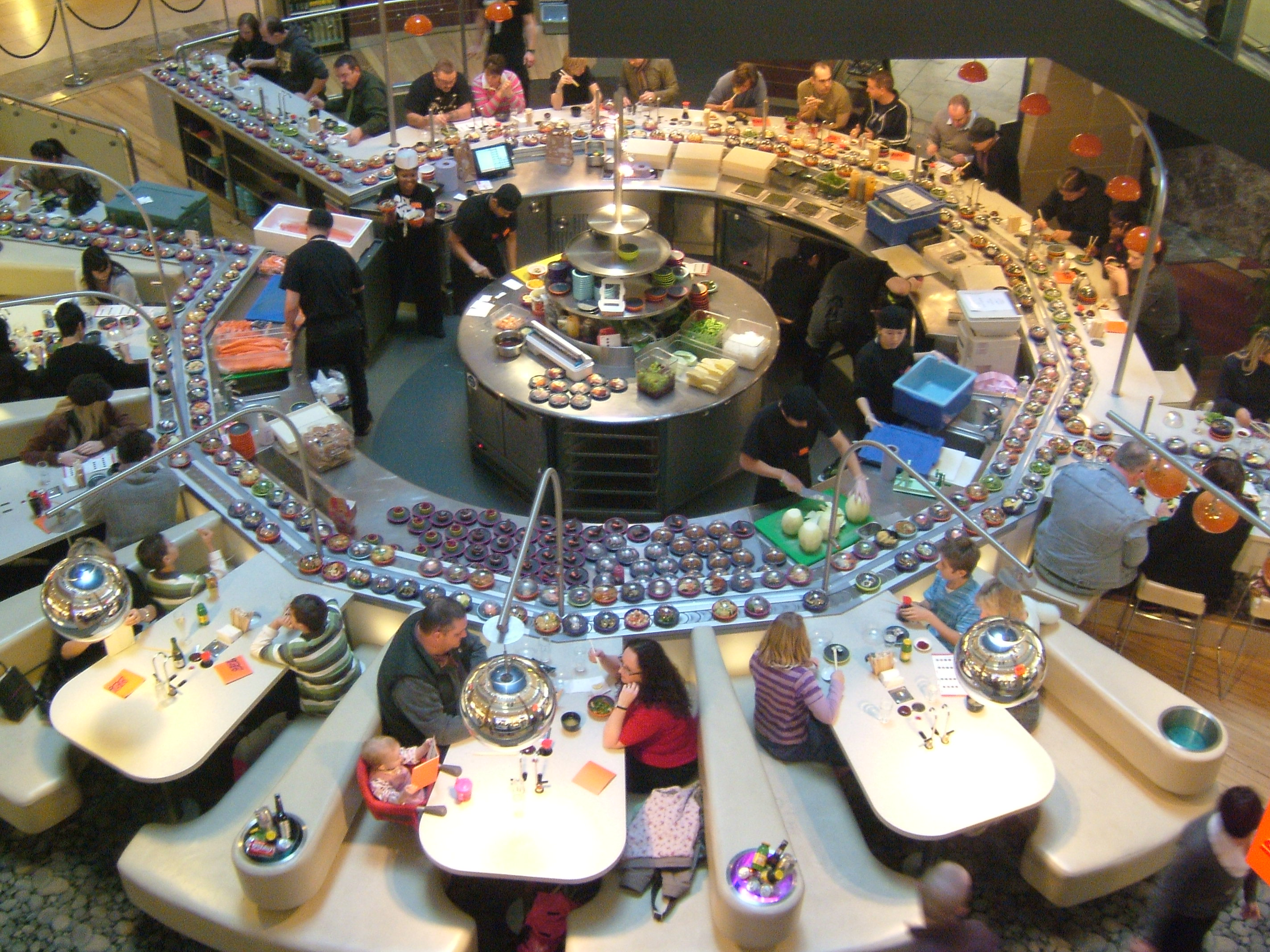
Conveyor belt sushi at Bluewater Shopping Centre in England

Conveyor belt sushi was invented by Yoshiaki Shiraishi (1914–2001), who had problems staffing his small sushi restaurant and had difficulties managing the restaurant by himself. He got the idea of a conveyor belt sushi after watching beer bottles on a conveyor belt in an Asahi brewery. After five years of development, including the design of the conveyor belt and the speed of operations, Shiraishi opened the first conveyor belt sushi Mawaru Genroku Sushi in Higashiosaka in 1958, eventually expanding to up to 250 restaurants all over Japan. However, by 2001, his company had just 11 restaurants. Shiraishi also invented a robotic sushi, served by robots, but this idea has not had commercial success.

Initially in a conveyor belt sushi restaurant, all customers were seated to face the conveyor belt, but this was not popular with groups. Subsequently, tables were added at right angles to the conveyor belt, allowing up to six people to sit at one table. This also reduced the length of conveyor belt necessary to serve a larger number of people.

A conveyor belt sushi boom started in 1970 after a conveyor belt sushi restaurant served sushi at the Osaka World Expo. Another boom started in 1980, when eating out became more popular, and finally in the late 1990s, when inexpensive restaurants became popular after the burst of the economic bubble. In 2010, Akindo Sushiro was the most famous conveyor belt sushi brand in Japan.

In 2023, some patrons were arrested for deliberately performing unhygienic acts such as licking or drinking from items passing in front of them towards other customers. These acts, dubbed "sushi terrorism", were performed as pranks with the video being shared online. Asked about this, Agriculture Minister Tetsuro Nomura said: “It is very unfortunate that such an act took place, as it had a significant impact on food industry operators and the Ministry of Agriculture, Forestry and Fisheries will pay special attention to the situation in the future.”

== See also ==
- Automat, a Western self-service restaurant concept
- Sushi machine
- Conveyor belt hot pot
- Gyūdon
- Casual dining restaurant
- Salmon chaos
