= Pascalization =

Method of preserving and sterilizing food under high pressure

Pascalization, bridgmanization, high pressure processing (HPP) or high hydrostatic pressure (HHP) processing is a method of preserving and sterilizing food, in which a product is processed under very high pressure, leading to the inactivation of certain microorganisms and enzymes in the food. HPP has a limited effect on covalent bonds within the food product, thus maintaining both the sensory and nutritional aspects of the product. The technique was named after Blaise Pascal, a 17th century French scientist whose work included detailing the effects of pressure on fluids. During pascalization, more than 50,000 pounds per square inch (340 MPa, 3.4 kbar) may be applied for approximately fifteen minutes, leading to the inactivation of yeast, mold, vegetative bacteria, and some viruses and parasites. Pascalization is also known as bridgmanization, named for physicist Percy Williams Bridgman.

Depending on temperature and pressure settings, HPP can achieve either pasteurization-equivalent log reduction or go further to achieve sterilization, which includes killing of endospores. Pasteurization-equivalent HPP can be done in chilled temperatures, while sterilization requires at least 90 °C (194 °F) under pressure. The pasteurization-equivalent is generally referred to as simply HHP (along other synonyms listed above), while the heated sterilization method is called HPT, for high pressure temperature. Synonyms for HPT include pressure-assisted thermal sterilization (PATS), pressure-enhanced sterilization (PES), high pressure thermal sterilization (HPTS), and high pressure high temperature (HPHT).

== Uses ==
=== HHP (pasteurization-equivalent) ===
Spoilage microorganisms and some enzymes can be deactivated by HPP, which can extend the shelf life while preserving the sensory and nutritional characteristics of the product. Pathogenic microorganisms such as Listeria, E. coli, Salmonella, and Vibrio are also sensitive to pressures of 400–1000 MPa used during HPP. Thus, HPP can pasteurize food products with decreased processing time, reduced energy usage, and less waste.

The treatment occurs at low temperatures and does not include the use of food additives. From 1990, some juices, jellies, and jams have been preserved using pascalization in Japan. The technique is now used there to preserve fish and meats, salad dressing, rice cakes, and yogurts. It preserves fruits, vegetable smoothies and other products such as meat for sale in the UK.

An early use of pascalization in the United States was to treat guacamole. It did not change the sauce's taste, texture, or color, but the shelf life of the product increased from three days to 30 days. Some treated foods require cold storage because pascalization cannot destroy all proteins, some of them exhibiting enzymatic activity which affects shelf life.

In recent years, HPP has also been used in the processing of raw pet food. Most commercial frozen and freeze-dried raw diets now go through post-packaging HPP treatment to destroy potential bacterial and viral contaminants, with salmonella being one of the major concerns.

=== HPT (commercial sterility) ===
Low-acid food require the killing of endospores to become shelf-stable. Addition of heat on top of pressure, as in HPT, achieves this goal. In 2009, FDA issued no objections to a petition for using HPT, specifically the type known as PATS, on mashed potato. In 2015, the FDA issued another no-objection for PES, another type of HPT, on seafood. Application of HPT to other types of fruit is still being explored.

=== Other uses ===
A short-duration application of HHP is able to separate the meat of shellfish from their shells, making hand-peeling much easier. HHP also inactivates Vibrio bacteria. HHP is used in 7% of seafood and shellfish.

== History ==
=== Late 19th century ===
Experiments into the effects of pressure on microorganisms have been recorded as early as 1884, and successful experiments since 1897. In 1899, B. H. Hite was the first to conclusively demonstrate the inactivation of microorganisms by pressure. After he reported the effects of high pressure on microorganisms, reports on the effects of pressure on foods quickly followed. Hite tried to prevent milk from spoiling, and his work showed that microorganisms can be deactivated by subjecting it to high pressure. He also mentioned some advantages of pressure-treating foods, such as the lack of antiseptics and no change in taste.

Hite said that, since 1897, a chemist at the West Virginia Agricultural Experimental Station had been studying the relationship between pressure and the preservation of meats, juices, and milk. Early experiments involved inserting a large screw into a cylinder and keeping it there for several days, but this did not have any effect in stopping the milk from spoiling. Later, a more powerful apparatus was able to subject the milk to higher pressures, and the treated milk was reported to stay sweeter for 24–60 hours longer than untreated milk. When 90 short tons (82 t) of pressure was applied to samples of milk for one hour, they stayed sweet for one week. The device used to induce pressure was later damaged when researchers tried to test its effects on other products.

Experiments were also performed with anthrax, typhoid, and tuberculosis, which was a potential health risk for the researchers. Before the process was improved, one employee of the Experimental Station became ill with typhoid fever.

The process that Hite reported on was not feasible for widespread use and did not always completely sterilize the milk. While more extensive investigations followed, the original study into milk was largely discontinued due to concerns over its effectiveness. Hite mentioned "certain slow changes in the milk" related to "enzymes that the pressure could not destroy".

=== Early 20th century ===
Hite et al. released a more detailed report on pressure sterilization in 1914, which included the number of microorganisms that remained in a product after treatment. Experiments were conducted on various other foods, including fruits, fruit juices and some vegetables. They were met with mixed success, similar to the results obtained from the earlier tests on milk. While some foods were preserved, others were not, possibly due to bacterial spores that had not been killed.

Hite's 1914 investigation led to other studies into the effect of pressure on microorganisms. In 1918, a study published by W. P. Larson et al. was intended to help advance vaccines. This report showed that bacterial spores were not always inactivated by pressure, while vegetative bacteria were usually killed. Larson et al.'s investigation also focused on the use of carbon dioxide, hydrogen, and nitrogen gas pressures. Carbon dioxide was found to be the most effective of the three at inactivating microorganisms.

=== Late 20th century–today ===
Around 1970, researchers renewed their efforts in studying bacterial spores after it was discovered that using moderate pressures was more effective than using higher pressures. These spores, which caused a lack of preservation in the earlier experiments, were inactivated faster by moderate pressure, but in a manner different from what occurred with vegetative microbes. When subjected to moderate pressures, bacterial spores germinate, and the resulting spores are easily killed using pressure, heat, or ionizing radiation. If the amount of initial pressure is increased, conditions are not ideal for germination, so the original spores must be killed instead. Using moderate pressure does not always work, as some bacterial spores are more resistant to germination under pressure and a small portion of them will survive. A preservation method using both pressure and another treatment (such as heat) to kill spores has not yet been reliably achieved. Such a technique would allow for wider use of pressure on food and other potential advancements in food preservation.

Research into the effects of high pressures on microorganisms was largely focused on deep-sea organisms until the 1980s, when advancements in ceramic processing were made. This resulted in the production of machinery that allowed for processing foods at high pressures at a large scale, and generated some interest in the technique, especially in Japan. Although commercial products preserved by pascalization first emerged in 1990, the technology behind pascalization is still being perfected for widespread use. There is now higher demand for minimally processed products than in previous years, and products preserved by pascalization have seen commercial success despite being priced significantly higher than products treated with standard methods.

In the early 2000s, it was discovered that pascalization can separate the meat of shellfish from their shells. Lobsters, shrimp, crabs, etc. may be pascalized, and afterwards their raw meat will easily slide whole out of the cracked shell.

== Process ==
In pascalization, food products are sealed and placed into a steel compartment containing a liquid, often water, and pumps are used to create pressure. The pumps may apply pressure constantly or intermittently. The application of high hydrostatic pressures (HHP) on a food product will kill many microorganisms, but the spores are not destroyed. Pascalization works especially well on acidic foods, such as yogurts and fruits, because pressure-tolerant spores are not able to live in environments with low pH levels. The treatment works equally well for both solid and liquid products.

Researchers are also developing a "continuous" method of high pressure processing of preserving liquid foods. The technology is known as ultra-shear technology (UST) or high pressure homogenization. This involves pressurization of liquid foods up to 400 MPa and subsequent depressurization by passage through tiny clearance in a shear valve. When the fluid exits the shear valve, due to significant pressure difference across the valve, the pressure energy is converted into kinetic energy. This kinetic energy is dissipated as heat energy to raise the temperature of the fluid and as heat loss to the surroundings. Remaining kinetic energy is spent on sample physical and structural modifications (mixing, emulsification, dispersion, particle size, enzyme, and microbial reduction) via intense mechanical forces, such as shear, turbulence, or cavitation. Thus, depending upon the product's initial temperature and process pressure, UST treatment can result in pasteurization or commercial sterilization effects along with structural modification in the treated liquid.

Bacterial spores survive pressure treatment at ambient or chilled conditions. The use of additional heat in high pressure temperature (HPT) kills these spores. Food is pre-heated to about 70 °C (158 °F) before entering the pressure compartment, then the pressure raises food temperature to the desired point (90 °C (194 °F) or higher) by adiabatic heating.

== Effects ==
During pascalization, the food's hydrogen bonds are selectively disrupted. Because pascalization is not heat-based, covalent bonds are not affected, causing no change in the food's taste. Hence, HPP does not destroy vitamins, maintaining the nutritional value of the food. High hydrostatic pressure can affect muscle tissues by increasing the rate of lipid oxidation, which in turn leads to poor flavor and decreased health benefits. There are some compounds present in foods that are subject to change during the treatment process. For example, carbohydrates are gelatinized by an increase in pressure instead of increasing the temperature during the treatment process.

Because hydrostatic pressure is able to act quickly and evenly on food, neither the size of a product's container nor its thickness play a role in the effectiveness of pascalization. There are several side effects of the process, including a slight increase in a product's sweetness, but pascalization does not greatly affect the nutritional value, taste, texture, and appearance. Thus, high pressure treatment of foods is regarded as a "natural" preservation method, as it does not use chemical preservatives.

== Criticism ==
Anurag Sharma, a geochemist; James Scott, a microbiologist; and others at the Carnegie Institution of Washington directly observed microbial activity at pressures in excess of 1 gigapascal. The experiments were performed up to 1.6 GPa (232,000 psi) of pressure, which is more than 16,000 times normal air pressure, or about 14 times the pressure in the Mariana Trench, the deepest ocean trench.

The experiment began by depositing an Escherichia coli and Shewanella oneidensis film in a diamond anvil cell (DAC). The pressure was then raised to 1.6 GPa. When raised to this pressure and kept there for 30 hours, at least 1% of the bacteria survived. The experimenters then monitored formate metabolism using in-situ Raman spectroscopy and showed that formate metabolism continued in the bacterial sample.

Moreover, 1.6 GPa is such great pressure that, during the experiment, the DAC turned the solution into ice-VI, a room-temperature ice. When the bacteria broke down the formate in the ice, liquid pockets would form because of the chemical reaction.

There was some skepticism of this experiment. According to Art Yayanos, an oceanographer at the Scripps Institution of Oceanography, an organism should only be considered living if it can reproduce. Another issue with the DAC experiment is that when high pressures occur, there are usually high temperatures present as well, but in this experiment there were not. This experiment was performed at room temperature. The intentional lack of high temperature in the experiments isolated the actual effects of pressure on life and results clearly indicated life to be largely pressure insensitive.

Newer results from independent research groups have confirmed the results of Sharma et al. (2002). This is a significant step that reiterates the need for a new approach to the old problem of studying environmental extremes through experiments. There is practically no debate on whether microbial life can survive pressures up to 600 MPa, which has been shown over the last decade or so to be valid through a number of scattered publications.

== Consumer acceptance ==
In the consumer studies of HighTech Europe, consumers mentioned more positive than negative associations descriptions for this technology, showing that these products are well-accepted.

== Manufactures and equipment ==
In HPP, a pressure vessel is used where the products are placed in. These vessel vary in size and are produced by different suppliers. The largest vessels size is 600 liters. The suppliers often provide a complete system around the vessel so the machine can handle loading/unloading, prefilling, pressurizing, hold time and decompression.

These are some examples of HPP equipment manufactures:

- Quintus Technologies
- thyssenkrupp Uhde
- JBT Marel

== See also ==
- Cold-pressed juice
- Orders of magnitude (pressure)
- Physical factors affecting microbial life
- Thermization
