= Pressure prism =

A pressure prism is a way of visually describing the variation of hydrostatic pressure within a volume of fluid. When variables of fluid density, depth, gravity, and other forces such as atmospheric pressure are charted, the resulting figure somewhat resembles a prism.

== Description ==
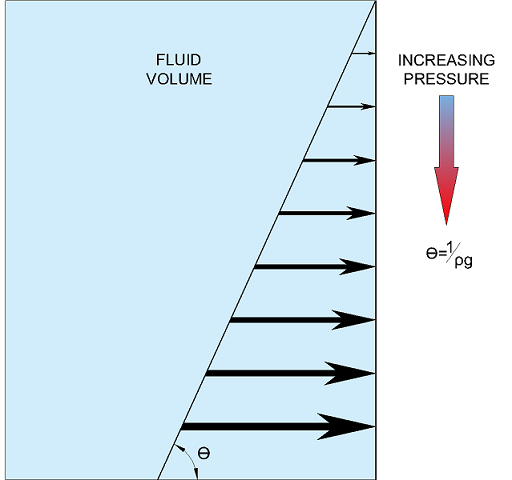
Pressure variation along depth

Hydrostatic pressure is the pressure exerted by a fluid at rest – for example, on the sides of a swimming pool, a glass of water or the bottom of the ocean. Its value at any given location within the fluid is the product of the fluid density (ρ), the depth (d), and the forces applied by gravity (g) plus any background pressures, such as atmospheric pressure.

Hydrostatic pressure on surfaces surrounding (or within) fluid volumes can be represented by the pressure prism, a useful visualization technique.

Hydrostatic pressure (P) increases linearly with depth. Generally it can be expressed by the relationship below, where the pressure at the top is zero and at the bottom is ρgH, H being the total depth of the fluid volume.

         P = ρgd,      where P is the gauge pressure above atmospheric pressure
                              ρ is the density of the fluid
                              g is gravitational acceleration
                              d is the target depth of the fluid

Variation of pressure with depth is shown in the first Figure above.

Further, the centre of pressure (COP) on the surrounding wall can be calculated by the following formula:

         HCOP  =  ∫px x dx / ∫px  dx,   where px is the pressure at x distance from the bottom

With this formula we see the height of the COP for a plane surface is H/3 from the bottom, as shown in Figure 2 (left).

With two fluids of differing density in a volume, the slope of the pressure prism will not be constant over the depth. See Figure 3 (right).

The pressure prisms shown as examples pertain to situations where the surrounding surfaces are flat. Pressure prisms for fluid volumes with curved surfaces are more complex.

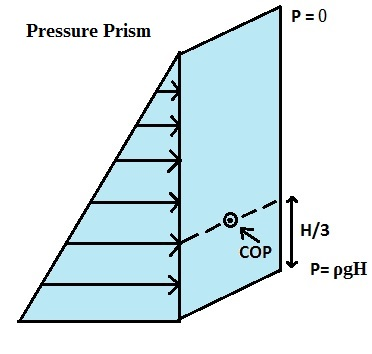
Pressure Prism

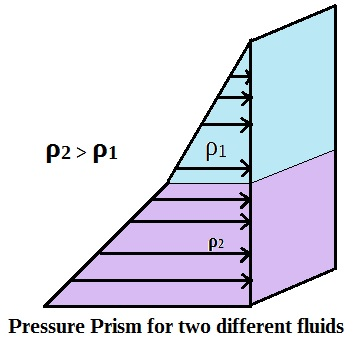
Bi-Fluid Pressure Prism
