= WNT16 =

Mammalian protein found in Homo sapiens

Identifiers
- Aliases: WNT16, Wnt family member 16
- External IDs: OMIM: 606267; MGI: 2136018; GeneCards: WNT16

Gene location (Human)
Chr.	Chromosome 7 (human)
Band	7q31.31	Start	121,325,367 bp
Band	7q31.31	End	121,341,104 bp

Gene location (Mouse)
Chr.	Chromosome 6 (mouse)
Band	6|6 A3.1	Start	22,288,226 bp
Band	6|6 A3.1	End	22,298,521 bp
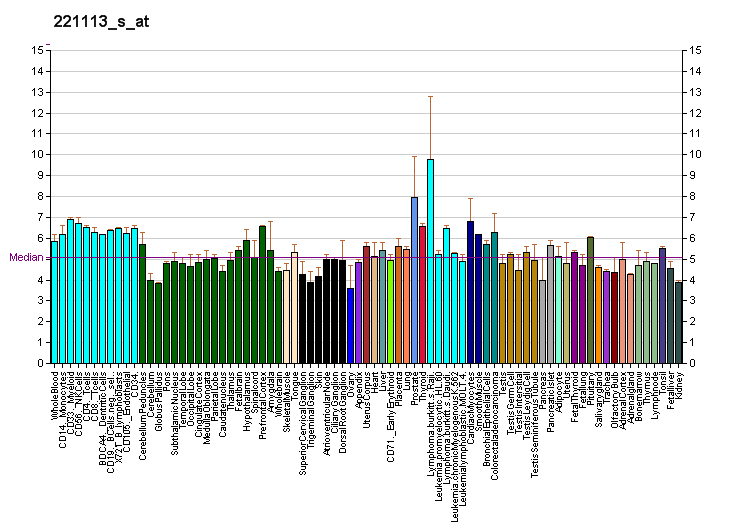
RNA expression pattern
Bgee	Human / Mouse (ortholog); Top expressed in: testicle; skin of hip; skin of thigh; skin of abdomen; Achilles tendon; granulocyte; vagina; tail of epididymis; germinal epithelium; endothelial cell / Top expressed in: female urethra; epithelium of female urethra; ascending aorta; iris; semi-lunar valve; aortic valve; lamina propria of urethra; hand joint; ciliary body; prostatic epithelium; More reference expression data
BioGPS	More reference expression data
Gene ontology
Molecular function	signaling receptor binding; frizzled binding
Cellular component	cytoplasm; extracellular region; extracellular space
Biological process	multicellular organism development; optic cup formation involved in camera-type eye development; positive regulation of phosphatidylinositol 3-kinase signaling; keratinocyte proliferation; cell fate commitment; positive regulation of gene expression; positive regulation of JNK cascade; bone remodeling; negative regulation of cell death; neuron differentiation; oxidative stress-induced premature senescence; keratinocyte differentiation; cardiac epithelial to mesenchymal transition; replicative senescence; Wnt signaling pathway
Sources:Amigo / QuickGO
Orthologs
Databases	NCBI: entry; OMA: entry
Species	Human	Mouse
Entrez	51384	93735
Ensembl	ENSG00000002745	ENSMUSG00000029671
UniProt	Q9UBV4	Q9QYS1
RefSeq (mRNA)	NM_057168; NM_016087	NM_053116
RefSeq (protein)	NP_057171; NP_476509	NP_444346
Location (UCSC)	Chr 7: 121.33 – 121.34 Mb	Chr 6: 22.29 – 22.3 Mb
PubMed search
- Wikidata
View/Edit Human	View/Edit Mouse

Protein Wnt-16 is a protein that in humans is encoded by the WNT16 gene. It has been proposed that stimulation of WNT16 expression in nearby normal cells is responsible for the development of chemotherapy-resistance in cancer cells.

== Function ==
The WNT gene family consists of structurally related genes that encode secreted signaling proteins. These proteins have been implicated in oncogenesis and in several developmental processes, including regulation of cell fate and patterning during embryogenesis. This gene is a member of the WNT gene family. It contains two transcript variants diverging at the 5' termini. These two variants are proposed to be the products of separate promoters and not to be splice variants from a single promoter. They are differentially expressed in normal tissues, one of which (variant 2) is expressed at significant levels only in the pancreas, whereas another one (variant 1) is expressed more ubiquitously with highest levels in adult kidney, placenta, brain, heart, and spleen.

WNT16B expression is regulated by nuclear factor of κ light polypeptide gene enhancer in B cells 1 (NF-κB) after DNA damage, as can occur to normal cells during radiation or chemotherapy. Subsequently WNT16B signals in a paracrine manner to activate the Wnt expression program in tumor cells. The expression of WNT16B in the tumor microenvironment attenuates the effects of cytotoxic chemotherapy in vivo, promoting tumor cell survival and disease progression. This implies a mechanism by which cycles of genotoxic therapy might enhance subsequent treatment resistance in the tumor microenvironment.
