= Sushiro =

Japanese sushi restaurant company

Akindo Sushiro Co., Ltd.

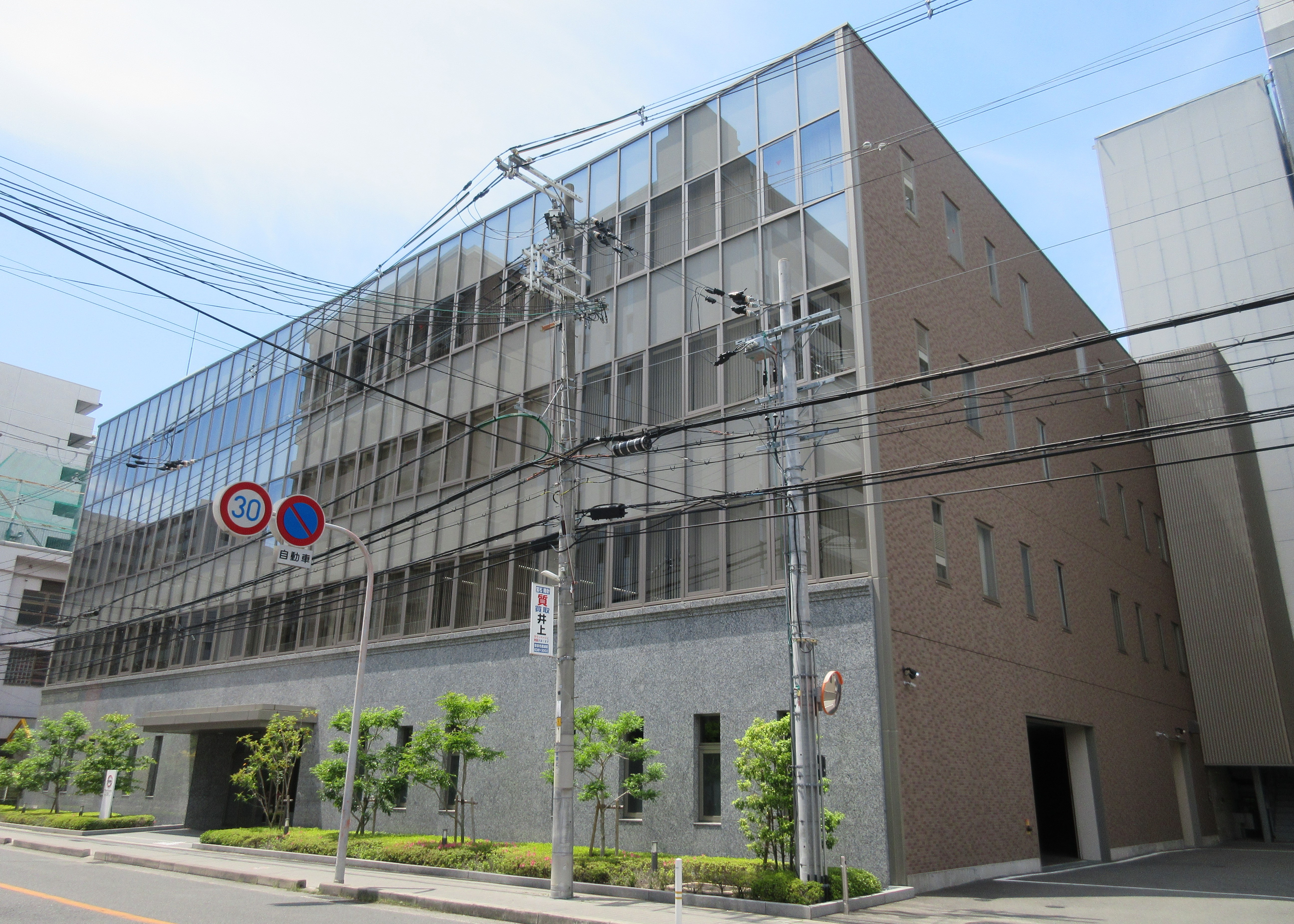
- Sushiro headquarters
- Native name: 株式会社あきんどスシロー
- Type: Kabushiki gaisha
- Industry: Retail (Japan); Food service (other countries)
- Founded: October 23, 1984; 42 years ago
- Founder: Yoshio Shimizu; Yutaka Shimizu
- Headquarters: 〒564-0063; 1-22-2 Esaka-cho; Suita, Osaka Japan
- Area served: Japan; South Korea; Taiwan; Hong Kong; Thailand; Singapore; China; Indonesia; United States
- Key people: Kohei Nii (Representative Director and President)
- Products: Conveyor belt sushi
- Revenue: 2,880,000,000 United States dollar (2025)
- Number of employees: 1417 employees (30 September 2019)
- Parent: Food & Life Companies
- Website: akindo-sushiro.biz (Japanese) akindo-sushiro.biz/en/ (English)

Food & Life Companies Ltd.
- Traded as: TYO: 3563
- Industry: food service restaurant retail restaurant industry
- Founded: 23 October 1984
- Founder: Yoshio Shimizu; Yutaka Shimizu
- Headquarters: Japan
- Revenue: 2,880,000,000 United States dollar (2025)
- Number of employees: 35,509 (2025)
- Subsidiaries: Akindo Sushiro Co., Ltd.; Kyotaru Co., Ltd.; Food & Life Innovation Ltd.; Sushiro Korea, Inc.; Sushiro Taiwan Co., Ltd.; Sushiro GH Singapore PTE.LTD.; Food & Life Companies Hong Kong Limited; Sushiro GH(Thailand) Ltd.; Guangzhou Sushiro Restaurants Co., Ltd.
- Website: food-and-life.co.jp

Akindo Sushiro (Japanese: あきんどスシロー, romanized: Akindo Sushirō) is a Japanese multinational conveyor belt sushi specialty store. It is headquartered in Suita, Osaka.

== History ==
Sushiro is currently the largest conveyor belt sushi company in turnover. It has more than 500 restaurants in Japan. The first overseas branch opened in Seoul, South Korea. In 2017, Taiwan Sushiro Co., Ltd. was established. On 15 June 2018, a Sushiro shop was opened in Taipei. In August 2019, it opened a branch in Hong Kong. In the same month, it opened its first branch in Singapore. In March 2021, the first Sushiro location in Thailand opened in Bangkok. In September 2021, it opened its first chain in mainland China, in Guangzhou. In November 2023, Sushiro Indonesia began operations at its first branch in Jakarta. Subsequently in April 2024, it was reported that Sushiro has set up a local company in Malaysia to consider its business expansion in the country, with the first outlet opened on 7 February 2025.

In 2026, Sushiro announced that it would open its first location in the United States, and the first outside of Asia. The first location was opened near Times Square, in New York City on November 19.

== Incidents ==
=== Japan ===
A Japanese Consumer Affairs Agency report released in June 2022 accused Sushiro of false advertising, by claiming a "limited offer" of sea urchin and crab sushi while having no stock of these in most stores.

On 29 January 2023, a video emerged showing a 17-year-old student at Sushiro’s Gifu Masakiten licking a soy sauce bottle and a cup before returning them, sucking his finger, and touching sushi moving along the conveyor belt. This caused the stock price of Food & Life Companies, the parent company of Sushiro, to plummet. Its market value lost more than 16 billion yen. In August, Sushiro dropped its lawsuit against the student, saying that he admitted his "responsibility" and reached a "reasonable" agreement. His attorneys argued that the decrease in customers could have been due to competition from other restaurants.

=== Taiwan ===
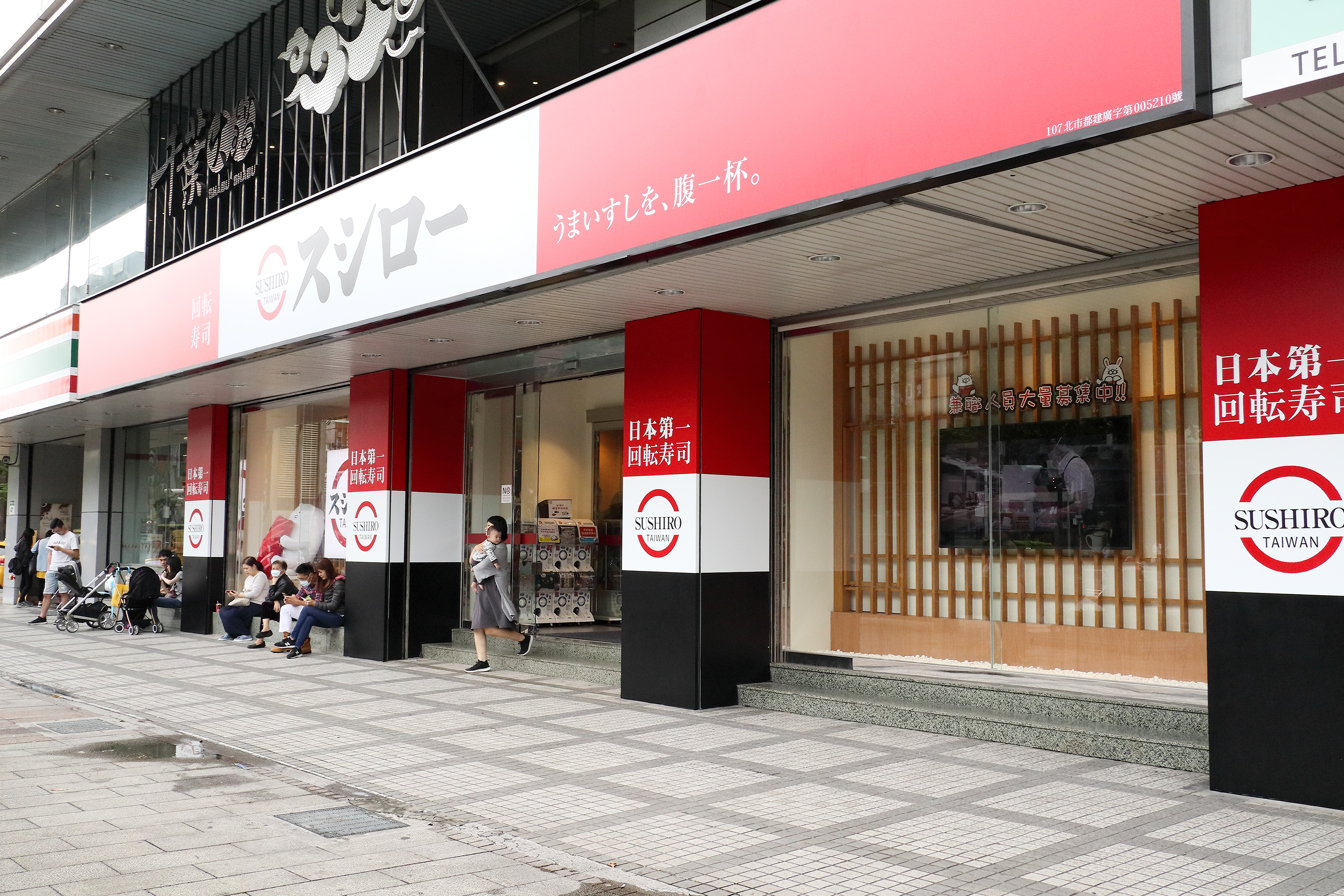
Sushiro restaurant in Ximending, Taipei

At the beginning of 2021, a two-day promotional event by Sushiro in Taiwan promised to serve free sushi to people with the word "salmon" in their name. This caused multiple Taiwanese people to change their names to include the word "salmon", an event the media dubbed "salmon chaos".

=== China ===
Multiple Sushiro chains in Guangzhou, China came under fire for linguistic discrimination after the chain's supervisors banned the Cantonese language between employees on its online chat groups. Sushiro later apologised, amid local boycotts.
