= Huang Hong-cheng =

Taiwanese social activist (born 1968)

- 黃宏成台灣阿成世界偉人財神總統
- His National ID Card as "Huang Hong-cheng Taiwan A-Cheng"

Personal details
- Born: 20 March 1968 (age 58) Zhongli District, Taoyuan, Taiwan
- Party: Non-Partisan
- Education: Soochow University

Chinese name
- Traditional Chinese: 黃宏成
- Simplified Chinese: 黄宏成
Transcriptions
Standard Mandarin
- Hanyu Pinyin: Huáng Hóngchéng
- Gwoyeu Romatzyh: Hwang Horngcherng
- Wade–Giles: Huang Hung-ch'eng

Full Chinese name
- Traditional Chinese: 黃宏成台灣阿成世界偉人財神總統
- Simplified Chinese: 黄宏成台湾阿成世界伟人财神总统
Transcriptions
Standard Mandarin
- Hanyu Pinyin: Huáng Hóngchéng Táiwān Ā Chéng Shìjiè Wěirén Cáishén Zǒngtǒng

Huang Hong-cheng (Chinese: 黃宏成; pinyin: Huáng Hóngchéng; born 20 March 1968) is a Taiwanese performance artist, a social activist and a perennial candidate in Taiwanese elections. Born Huang Hong-cheng (黃宏成), he has been well-known for renaming himself multiple times. He is currently known as 黃宏成台灣阿成世界偉人財神總統 (pinyin: Huáng Hóngchéng Táiwān Ā Chéng Shìjiè Wěirén Cáishén Zǒngtǒng, lit. 'Huang Hong-cheng, Ah Cheng from Taiwan, World's Greatest Man, God of Wealth, and President'). He once had the longest name in Taiwan, but the record was broken by a YouTuber, who changed his name in June 2020.

Since 2010, he has run in Taiwanese elections, but has yet to be elected to office.
