= List of IATA-indexed railway stations, bus stations and ferry terminals =

Many major railway stations, bus stations and ferry terminals that are involved in intermodal passenger transport are assigned codes by the International Air Transport Association (IATA), similar to IATA airport codes. Such railway stations, bus stations and ferry terminals are typically used in air-rail alliances or code sharing agreements (commonly known as "Rail Fly") between airlines, rail lines, and ferry lines, but can also be used for buses run directly from airlines (such as the Helsinki Airport - Turku / Tampere buses directly operated by Finnair), particularly in Europe. By assigning stations an IATA code, passengers on trips involving those stations can be ticketed all the way through the journey, including being checked straight through to their final destination, without the bother of having to claim their baggage and check-in again when changing between the surface and air portions of a trip. At other places, passengers have to carry their baggage onto the train, but need no separate train booking process.

These kinds of arrangement can help airlines removing their short-haul flights and reduce their carbon footprint.

== Airport locations ==
Rail lines and stations at airports include:

=== Austria ===
- Vienna International Airport
  - Vienna Airport railway station, in terminal

=== Belgium ===
- Antwerp International Airport
  - Antwerpen-Berchem railway station, located 2 km (1.2 mi) from airport
  - Antwerpen-Centraal railway station, located 4 km (2.5 mi) from airport
- Brussels Airport
  - Brussels Airport-Zaventem railway station, beneath terminal
  - Brussels-South railway station, located 14.3 km (8.9 mi) from airport

=== Denmark ===
- Copenhagen Airport
  - Copenhagen Airport railway station, beneath terminal
  - Copenhagen Central Station, located 8.3 km (5.2 mi) from airport

=== Finland ===
- Helsinki Airport
  - Helsinki Airport station, beneath terminal
  - Helsinki Central Station, located 18.3 km (11.4 mi) from airport
  - Tikkurila railway station, located 6 km (3.7 mi) from airport

=== France ===
- Charles de Gaulle Airport
  - Aéroport Charles de Gaulle 1 station, beneath terminal, linked to CDGVAL and RER B
  - Aéroport Charles de Gaulle 2 TGV station, beneath terminal, linked to CDGVAL, TGV, SNCF and LGV Interconnexion Est
- Lyon–Saint-Exupéry Airport
  - Lyon-Saint-Exupéry TGV station, attached to airport
  - Lyon-Part-Dieu station, located 18.4 km (11.4 mi) from airport, linked by Rhônexpress

=== Germany ===
- Cologne Bonn Airport
  - Cologne/Bonn Airport station, connected by the Cologne Airport loop to the Cologne–Frankfurt high-speed rail line, using Intercity Express and Rhine-Ruhr S-Bahn
- Düsseldorf Airport
  - Düsseldorf Airport station, connected to terminals by Düsseldorf SkyTrain
  - Düsseldorf Airport Terminal station, located under Terminal C, serviced by Rhine-Ruhr S-Bahn
- Frankfurt Airport
- Leipzig/Halle Airport

=== Italy ===
- Milan Malpensa Airport
  - Malpensa Aeroporto Terminal 1 railway station, serviced by Malpensa Express
  - Malpensa Aeroporto Terminal 2 railway station, serviced by Malpensa Express
  - Milano Centrale railway station, located 48.9 km (30.4 mi) from airport, linked by Malpensa Express

=== Netherlands ===
- Amsterdam Airport Schiphol near Amsterdam, Netherlands. Air France-KLM offers tickets including flights to and from Amsterdam or Paris with corresponding trains and/or buses to Belgium.

=== Norway ===
- Oslo Airport, Gardermoen (Flytoget)
- Trondheim Airport (SJ Norge)

=== Sweden ===
- Stockholm Arlanda Airport, air tickets usable for Swedish State Railways.

=== Switzerland ===
- Geneva Airport
  - Geneva Airport railway station, underground, next to airport, serviced by Swiss Federal Railways
- Zurich Airport railway station (Swiss Federal Railways)

=== Turkey ===
- İzmir Adnan Menderes Airport railway station (İZBAN)

=== United Kingdom ===
- Birmingham Airport
  - Birmingham International railway station, connected to the airport by the Air-Rail Link
- London
  - Gatwick Airport railway station has connections to London and other points on the National Rail Network
  - Heathrow Airport stations (Heathrow Express and London Underground Piccadilly line)
  - London Stansted Airport (Stansted Express)
  - London City Airport (Docklands Light Railway)
- Manchester Airport station
- Glasgow Prestwick Airport railway station

=== United States ===
- Newark Liberty International Airport, Newark, New Jersey, United States (near New York, New York), with Amtrak.
- Baltimore/Washington International Airport, Baltimore, Maryland, United States, with Amtrak.
- O'Hare International Airport, Chicago, Illinois, United States
  - O'Hare station, Chicago "L"
  - O'Hare Transfer station, Metra
- John F. Kennedy International Airport, Queens, New York, United States, with Amtrak.

== Station codes ==
The IATA codes for non-airport stations normally begin with Q, X or Z. For some smaller cities the railway station in the city has the same code as the airport outside the city (several kilometers distance). A connection involving transfer between them can appear when searching travel possibilities. A taxi ride, a train, or a bus transfer is usually needed then.

A
ADB: Adnan Menderes Airport railway station, Gaziemir, Turkey
AMS: Schiphol Airport railway station on the Weesp–Leiden railway line near Amsterdam, Netherlands; high-speed trains (Thalys and Intercity Direct) to Rotterdam, Brussels and Paris using HSL-Zuid stop at the station as well
ARN: Arlanda North Station, Arlanda South Station, and Arlanda Central Station, Sigtuna Municipality, Sweden
B
BHX: Birmingham International railway station, Bickenhill, England, United Kingdom, connected to the airport by the Air-Rail Link
BNJ: Bonn Hauptbahnhof, Bonn, Germany (at Bonn-Hangelar Airport (ICAO: EDKB))
BOO: Bodø Station, Bodø, Norway, located 2.1 km (1.3 mi) from Bodø Airport
BRS: Bristol Temple Meads railway station, Redcliffe, Bristol, England, United Kingdom, located 7.7 mi (12.4 km) from Bristol Airport, serviced by Airport Flyer
BRU: Brussels Airport-Zaventem railway station, Zaventem, Belgium, located beneath the airport terminal
C
CBG: Cambridge railway station, Cambridge, England, United Kingdom, shares IATA code with Cambridge City Airport
CDG: Aéroport Charles de Gaulle 1 station, Tremblay-en-France, serviced by CDGVAL and RER B; Aéroport Charles de Gaulle 2 TGV station, Roissy-en-France, serviced by CDGVAL, TGV, SNCF and LGV Interconnexion Est
CGN: Cologne/Bonn Airport station, Cologne, Germany, located between two airport terminals, connected by the Cologne Airport loop to the Cologne–Frankfurt high-speed rail line, using Intercity Express and Rhine-Ruhr S-Bahn
CPH: Copenhagen Airport railway station, Tårnby, Denmark, located under the airport's Terminal 3
D
DUS: Düsseldorf Airport station, Germany on the Cologne–Duisburg railway line (SkyTrain people mover).
E
EWR: Newark Liberty International Airport Station, Newark, New Jersey, United States (2 km or 1.2 mi from the airport via monorail)
F
FRA: Frankfurt Airport long-distance station in Frankfurt am Main, Germany, on the Cologne–Frankfurt high-speed rail line (walking distance from the airport)
FVS: Finland Station, Saint Petersburg, Russia
FYG: Fuyong Ferry Terminal, Shenzhen, China
G
GGZ: Graz Hauptbahnhof, Graz, Austria
GVA: Geneva Airport railway station, Le Grand-Saconnex, Switzerland
H
HEC: Helsinki Central Station, Helsinki, Finland
HKM: Hong Kong–Zhuhai–Macau Bridge Macau Port, Macau, China
HVT: Tikkurila railway station, Helsinki, Finland
HZI: Hong Kong–Zhuhai–Macau Bridge Zhuhai Port, Zhuhai, China
I
IOB: Innsbruck Hauptbahnhof, Innsbruck, Austria
J
JKG: Jönköping railway station, Sweden (11 km from the airport)
K
KGV: Klagenfurt Hauptbahnhof, Klagenfurt, Austria
KHL: The Yangtze River Delta International Airport Modern Logistics Center, Kunshan, Suzhou, China
KLR: Kalmar railway station, Sweden (6 km from the airport)
KSD: Karlstad railway station, Sweden (17 km from the airport)
KVS: Kunshan City Air Terminal of Shanghai Airport, Kunshan, Suzhou, China
L
LEJ: Leipzig/Halle Airport station, Schkeuditz, Germany
LHR: London Heathrow stations: Central, T2,3, T4 tube, T4 rail, T5 (all inside Heathrow Airport perimeter).
LPI: Linköping railway station, Sweden (3 km from the airport)
LPL: Liverpool Lime Street railway station, England, United Kingdom
LYS: Lyon-Saint-Exupéry TGV station, Colombier-Saugnieu, France
LZS: Linz Hauptbahnhof, Linz, Austria
M
MAN: Manchester Airport station, Ringway, Manchester, England, United Kingdom
MHJ: Mannheim Hauptbahnhof, Mannheim, Germany
MXP: Malpensa Aeroporto Terminal 1 railway station and Malpensa Aeroporto Terminal 2 railway station, Milan, Italy
N
NBD: Ningbo South Bus Station, Ningbo, China
NCL: Newcastle railway station, England, United Kingdom
NKJ: Nanjing South Railway Station, Nanjing, China
NSZ: Nansha Port, Guangzhou, China
O
OSD: Östersund railway station, Sweden (9 km from the airport)
OSL: Oslo Airport Station, Norway (within the airport terminal)
P
PFT: Pazhou Ferry Terminal, Guangzhou, China
PIK: Prestwick International Airport railway station, Prestwick, Scotland, United Kingdom
POK: St. Pölten Hauptbahnhof, St. Pölten, Austria
Q
QDH: Ashford International, Ashford, Kent, England, United Kingdom
QDL: Lugano railway station, Lugano, Switzerland
QDU: Düsseldorf Hauptbahnhof, Düsseldorf, Germany
QFB: Freiburg Hauptbahnhof, Freiburg, Germany
QFV: Bergen station, Bergen, Norway
QJZ: Nantes station, Nantes, France
QKL: Köln Hauptbahnhof, Cologne, Germany
QLJ: Lucerne railway station, Lucerne, Switzerland
QLS: Lausanne railway station, Switzerland
QPP: Berlin Hauptbahnhof, Berlin, Germany
QQK: King's Cross railway station, London, England, United Kingdom
QQM: Manchester Piccadilly station, Manchester, England, United Kingdom
QQN: Birmingham New Street railway station, Birmingham, England, United Kingdom
QQP: London Paddington station, London, England, United Kingdom
QQS: St Pancras railway station, London, England, United Kingdom
QQU: Euston railway station, London, England, United Kingdom
QQW: Waterloo International railway station, London, England, United Kingdom
QQY: York railway station, Yorkshire, England, United Kingdom
QRH: Rotterdam Centraal station, Rotterdam, Netherlands
QRZ: Breda railway station, Breda, Netherlands
QXB: Aix-en-Provence TGV station, Aix-en-Provence, France
QXG: Angers-Saint-Laud station, Saint-Laud, Angers, France
QYG: collective code for all German railway stations
QYX: Uppsala Central Station, Uppsala, Sweden
R
RWA: Warszawa Centralna railway station, Warsaw, Poland
S
SGS: Shinagawa Station, Tokyo, Japan
SIA: Southend Airport railway station at London Southend Airport (IATA: SEN, ICAO: EGMC), England, United Kingdom
SOO: Söderhamn railway station, Sweden (same code as the old airport which has no scheduled flights anymore)
STN: Stansted Airport railway station (Stansted Express, underneath airport of same code), England, United Kingdom
SWS: Swansea railway station, Wales, United Kingdom
SZD: Suzhou Railway Station North Square Bus Station, Suzhou, China
SZO: Suzhou City Air Terminal of Shanghai Airport, Suzhou, China
T
THN: Trollhättan railway station, Sweden (6 kilometres (3.7 mi) from the airport)
TRD: Trondheim Airport Station, Norway (walking distance from the airport)
TTK: Tottenham Hale station, London, England, United Kingdom (no airport)
TYQ: Tokyo Station, Tokyo, Japan
V
VIE: Vienna Airport railway station, Austria
VST: Västerås railway station, Sweden (6 kilometres (3.7 mi) from the airport)
VXO: Växjö railway station, Sweden (9 kilometres (5.6 mi) from the airport)
X
XAT: Antibes station, Antibes, France
XAX: Dorval, Montréal, Quebec, Canada (2 kilometres (1.2 mi) from Montréal–Trudeau International Airport (IATA: YUL, ICAO: CYUL))
XBF: Bellegarde station, Bellegarde-sur-Valserine, France
XBK: Bourg-en-Bresse station, Bourg-en-Bresse, France
XCG: Cagnes-sur-Mer station, Cagnes-sur-Mer, France
XDB: Lille-Europe station, Lille, France
XDH: Jasper station, Jasper, Alberta, Canada
XDS: Ottawa station, Ottawa, Ontario, Canada
XDV: Prince George station, Prince George, British Columbia, Canada
XDW: Prince Rupert station, Prince Rupert, British Columbia, Canada
XDZ: The Pas station, The Pas, Manitoba, Canada
XEA: Pacific Central Station, Vancouver, British Columbia, Canada
XED: Marne-la-Vallée–Chessy station, Chessy, Seine-et-Marne, France (for Disneyland Paris)
XEF: Union Station, Winnipeg, Manitoba, Canada
XEV: Stockholm Central Station, Stockholm, Sweden
XEW: Flemingsberg railway station (formerly Stockholm Syd Flemingsberg), Flemingsberg, Sweden
XFF: Calais-Fréthun station, Calais, France
XFJ: Eskilstuna Central station, Eskilstuna, Sweden
XFP: Malmö Central Station, Malmö, Sweden
XGB: Gare Montparnasse, Paris, France
XGC: Lund Central Station, Lund, Sweden
XGH: Flåm Station, Flåm, Norway
XGJ: Cobourg station, Cobourg, Ontario, Canada
XGZ: Bregenz railway station, Bregenz, Austria
XHJ: Aachen Hauptbahnhof, Aachen, Germany
XHK: Valence TGV station, Valence, Drôme, France
XIA: Guelph Central Station, Guelph, Ontario, Canada
XIK: Milano Centrale railway station, Milan, Italy
XIT: Leipzig Hauptbahnhof, Leipzig, Germany
XIZ: Champagne-Ardenne TGV station, Bezannes, France
XJY: Massy TGV station, Massy, Essonne, France
XKL: Kuala Lumpur Sentral station, Brickfields, Kuala Lumpur, Malaysia
XLM: Saint-Lambert station, Saint-Lambert, Montérégie, Quebec, Canada
XLV: Niagara Falls station, Niagara Falls, Ontario, Canada
XOC: Madrid Atocha railway station, Madrid, Spain
XOP: Poitiers station, Poitiers, France
XPG: Gare du Nord, Paris, France
XPH: Port Hope station, Port Hope, Ontario, Canada
XPJ: Montpellier-Saint-Roch station, Montpellier, France
XQE: Ebbsfleet International railway station, Ebbsfleet Valley, England, United Kingdom (Eurostar)
XQT: Lichfield Trent Valley railway station, England, United Kingdom
XRG: Rugeley Trent Valley railway station, England, United Kingdom
XRF: Marseille-Saint-Charles station, Marseille, France
XRJ: Roma Termini railway station, Rome, Italy
XRK: Moscow Paveletsky railway station, Moscow, Russia
XSH: Tours Saint-Pierre-des-Corps railway station, Tours, France
XTP: Tampere bus station, Tampere, Finland
XTZ: Turku bus station, Turku, Finland
XVQ: Venezia Santa Lucia railway station, Venice, Italy
XWC: Wien Hauptbahnhof, Vienna, Austria
XWG: Strasbourg-Ville station, Strasbourg, France
XWK: Karlskrona railway station, Karlskrona, Sweden
XWL: Gothenburg Central Station, Gothenburg, Sweden
XWR: Örebro railway station, Örebro, Sweden
XWW: Wien Westbahnhof railway station, Vienna, Austria
XXL: Lillehammer Station, Lillehammer, Norway
XXQ: Keleti Pályaudvar, Budapest, Hungary
XXZ: Sundsvall railway station, Sundsvall, Sweden
XYB: Borlänge railway station, Borlänge, Sweden
XYD: Lyon-Part-Dieu station, Lyon, France
XYG: Praha hlavní nádraží, Prague, Czech Republic
XYH: Helsingborg railway station, Helsingborg, Sweden
XYJ: Praha-Holešovice, Prague, Czech Republic
XYL: Lyon-Perrache station, Lyon, France
XYM: Falkenberg Railway Station, Falkenberg, Sweden
XZI: Lorraine TGV station, Louvigny, Moselle, France
XZL: Edmonton station, Edmonton, Canada
XZM: Outer Harbour Ferry Terminal, Macau, China
XZN: Avignon TGV station, Avignon, France
XZO: Oslo Central Station, Oslo, Norway
XZT: Trondheim Central Station, Trondheim, Norway
XZV: Toulon station, Toulon, France
Y
YBZ: Union Station, Toronto, Ontario, Canada (about 3 km (1.9 mi) from Billy Bishop Toronto City Airport (IATA: YTZ, ICAO: CYTZ) by ferry and tunnel)
YCM: St. Catharines station, St. Catharines, Ontario, Canada
YJD: Barcelona França railway station, Barcelona, Spain
YJH: San Sebastián railway station, San Sebastián, Spain
YJL: Santander railway station, Santander, Spain
YJV: Estació del Nord (Valencia), Valencia, Spain
YMY: Montreal Central Station, Quebec, Canada (about 19 km from Montréal–Trudeau International Airport)
Z
ZAQ: Nürnberg Hauptbahnhof, Nuremberg, Germany
ZBA: Basel Badischer Bahnhof, Basel, Switzerland
ZBP: Baltimore Penn Station, Baltimore, Maryland, United States
ZBJ: Fredericia Station, Fredericia, Denmark
ZDH: Basel SBB railway station, Basel, Switzerland
ZDI: Bellinzona railway station, Bellinzona, Switzerland
ZDJ: Bern railway station, Bern, Switzerland
ZDL: Brig railway station, Brig, Switzerland
ZDT: Chur railway station, Chur, Switzerland
ZDU: Dundee railway station, Dundee, Scotland, United Kingdom
ZDV: Davos Platz railway station, Davos, Switzerland
ZEP: London Victoria station, England, United Kingdom
ZEU: Göttingen station, Göttingen, Germany
ZFJ: Rennes station, Rennes, France
ZFQ: Bordeaux-Saint-Jean station, Bordeaux, France
ZFT: Fort Lauderdale station, Fort Lauderdale, Florida, United States
ZFV: 30th Street Station, Philadelphia, Pennsylvania, United States
ZFZ: Buffalo–Depew station, Depew, New York, United States
ZGD: New London Union Station, New London, Connecticut, United States
ZGG: Glasgow Central railway station, Scotland, United Kingdom
ZGH: Copenhagen Central Station, Copenhagen, Denmark
ZGN: Zhongshan Port, Zhongshan, China
ZHC: North Philadelphia station, Philadelphia, Pennsylvania, United States
ZHF: Fribourg/Freiburg railway station, Fribourg, Switzerland
ZHS: Klosters Platz railway station, Klosters, Switzerland
ZHT: Genève-Cornavin railway station, Geneva, Switzerland
ZIN: Interlaken Ost railway station, Interlaken, Switzerland
ZIV: Inverness railway station, Inverness, Scotland, United Kingdom
ZJP: Montreux railway station, Montreux, Switzerland
ZKD: Moscow Leningradsky railway station, Moscow, Russia
ZKH: St. Moritz railway station, St. Moritz, Switzerland
ZKO: Sierre/Siders railway station, Sierre, Switzerland
ZKZ: Vevey railway station, Vevey, Switzerland
ZLB: Visp railway station, Visp, Switzerland
ZLN: Le Mans railway station, Le Mans, France
ZLS: Liverpool Street station, London, England, United Kingdom
ZLY: Albany–Rensselaer station, Rensselaer, New York, United States
ZMB: Hamburg Hauptbahnhof, Hamburg, Germany
ZME: Metropark station, Woodbridge Township, New Jersey, United States
ZMI: Mergellina station, Naples, Italy
ZML: Milwaukee Intermodal Station, Milwaukee, Wisconsin, United States
ZMS: Firenze Santa Maria Novella railway station, Florence, Italy
ZMU: München Hauptbahnhof, Munich, Germany
ZPY: Siegburg/Bonn station, Siegburg, Germany
ZRA: Atlantic City Rail Terminal, Atlantic City, New Jersey, United States
ZRB: Frankfurt (Main) Hauptbahnhof, Frankfurt, Germany
ZRD: Richmond Main Street Station, Richmond, Virginia, United States
ZRH: Zürich Airport railway station, Zürich, Switzerland
ZRL: Lancaster station, Lancaster, Pennsylvania, United States
ZRP: Newark Penn Station, Newark, New Jersey, United States
ZRT: Hartford Union Station, Hartford, Connecticut, United States
ZRU: Route 128 station, Westwood, Massachusetts, United States
ZRV: Providence station, Providence, Rhode Island, United States
ZRZ: New Carrollton station, New Carrollton, Maryland, United States
ZSB: Salzburg Hauptbahnhof ÖBB station, Salzburg, Austria
ZSF: Springfield Union Station, Springfield, Massachusetts, United States
ZSV: Gateway Transportation Center, St. Louis, Missouri, United States
ZTD: Schenectady station, Schenectady, New York, United States
ZTE: Louise M. Slaughter Rochester Station, Rochester, New York, United States
ZTF: Stamford Transportation Center, Stamford, Connecticut, United States
ZTI: Humen Port, Dongguan, China
ZTJ: Princeton Junction station, Princeton Junction, New Jersey, United States
ZTN: Trenton Transit Center, Trenton, New Jersey, United States
ZTO: South Station, Boston, Massachusetts, United States
ZTY: Back Bay station, Boston, Massachusetts, United States
ZUA: Utica Union Station, Utica, New York, United States
ZUF: Sion railway station (Switzerland), Sion, Switzerland
ZUG: Harrisburg Transportation Center, Harrisburg, Pennsylvania, United States
ZUN: Chicago Union Station, Chicago, Illinois, United States
ZVE: Union Station, New Haven, Connecticut, United States
ZVM: Hannover Messe/Laatzen station, Laatzen, Germany
ZVR: Hannover Hauptbahnhof, Hanover, Germany
ZWB: Williamsburg Transportation Center, Williamsburg, Virginia, United States
ZWC: Stavanger Station, Stavanger, Norway
ZWE: Antwerpen-Centraal railway station, Belgium
ZWI: Wilmington station, Wilmington, Delaware, United States
ZWP: West Palm Beach station, West Palm Beach, Florida, United States
ZWS: Stuttgart Hauptbahnhof, Stuttgart, Germany
ZWU: Washington Union Station, Washington, D.C., United States
ZWW: Newport News station, Newport News, Virginia, United States
ZXA: Aberdeen railway station, Scotland, United Kingdom
ZXE: Edinburgh Waverley railway station, Scotland, United Kingdom
ZXS: Buffalo–Exchange Street station, Buffalo, New York, United States
ZYA: Amsterdam Centraal station, Amsterdam, The Netherlands
ZYH: Den Haag Centraal railway station, The Hague, The Netherlands
ZYK: Shekou Port, Shenzhen, China
ZYN: Nîmes station, Nîmes, France
ZYP: New York Penn Station, New York City, New York, United States
ZYQ: William F. Walsh Regional Transportation Center, Syracuse, New York, United States
ZYR: Brussels-South railway station, Brussels, Saint-Gilles, Belgium
ZYZ: Antwerpen-Berchem railway station, Berchem, Belgium

== See also ==
- Air-rail alliance
- Airport rail link
- Lists of airports § By code
- List of railway stations
