= Aérofret station =

Proposed railway station in France

Aérofret

General information
- Location: Rue de la Belle Borne and Chem. de Roissy à Villepinte; Tremblay-en-France; France
- Coordinates: 48°59′24.5″N 2°31′12.2″E
- Operator: SNCF
- Platforms: 2 side platforms
- Tracks: 2

Construction
- Accessible: Yes, by prior reservation

Other information
- Fare zone: 4

History
- Opening: TBA

Services
Preceding station	RER	Following station
Aéroport Charles de Gaulle 1 towards Aéroport Charles de Gaulle 2 TGV	RER B	Parc des Expositions towards Robinson or Saint-Rémy-lès-Chevreuse
Location

Aérofret (French pronunciation: [aeʁɔfʁɛt]) is a proposed infill station on RER B's Airport branch northeast of Paris. It will be in the town of Tremblay-en-France in the Seine-Saint-Denis department and will serve the Aéroville mall as well as hotels and planned development on the western side of the freight areas on the western side of Charles de Gaulle Airport. It was proposed as part of the Grand Paris public works programme.

== Location ==
The new station between Parc des Expositions to the south-southwest and Aéroport Charles de Gaulle 1 to the northeast is slated to open along with planned developments in the area. The opening date remains to be announced. The station will be located at kilometre 22.98 of the Airport (B3) branch of RER B.

== Service ==
The station will see services between Aéroport Charles de Gaulle 2 TGV and Robinson or Saint-Rémy-lès-Chevreuse via Gare du Nord in Paris. Trains run every 15 minutes throughout the day, with additional services during peak hours.
