= Parc des Expositions station =

Railway station in Villepinte, France

Parc des Expositions
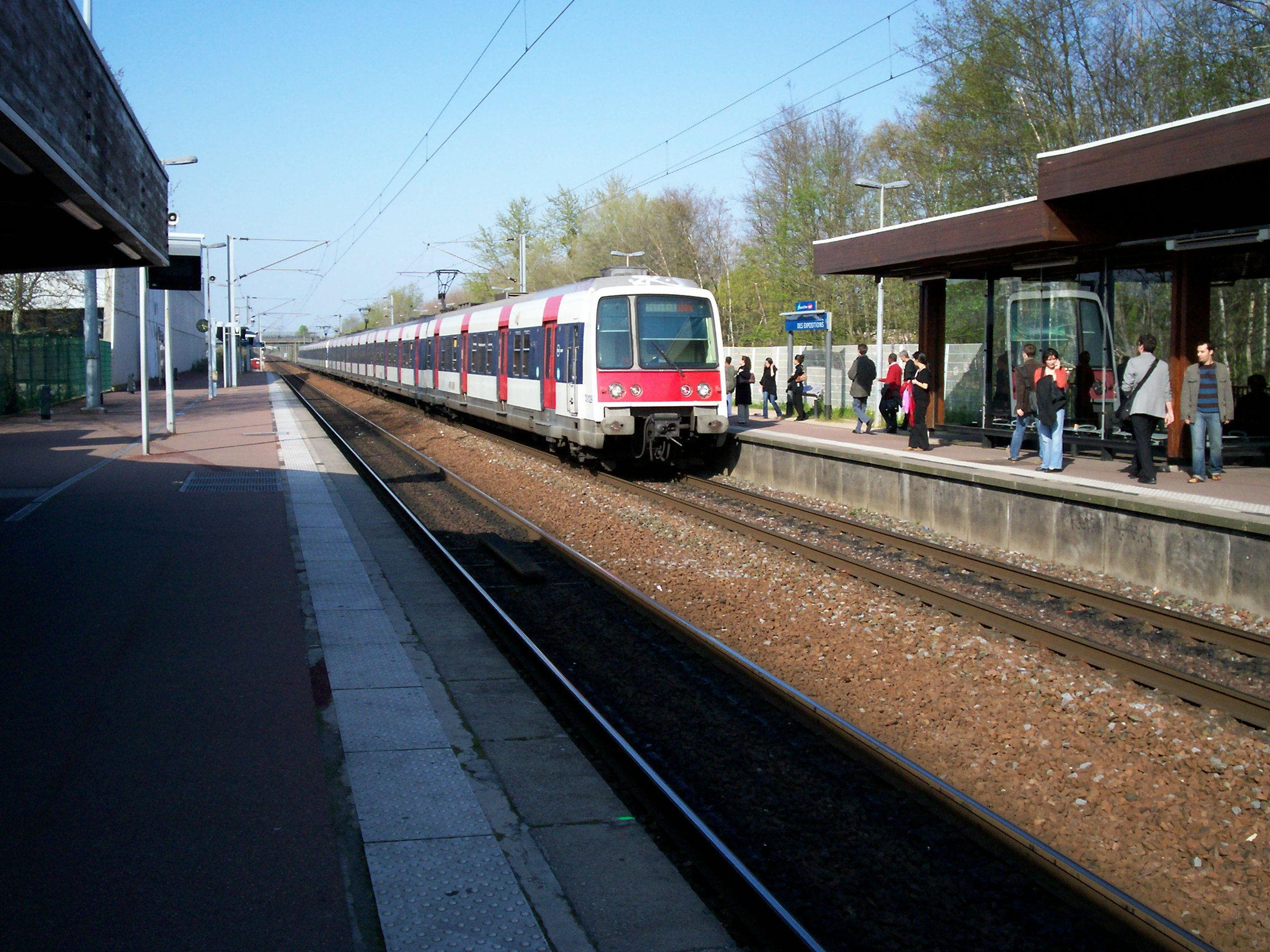
- Parc des Expositions station platforms

General information
- Location: 82 Avenue des Nations; Villepinte; France
- Coordinates: 48.973425°N 2.514370°E
- Operator: SNCF
- Platforms: 2 side platforms
- Tracks: 2

Construction
- Accessible: Yes, by prior reservation

Other information
- Station code: 87271486
- Fare zone: 4

History
- Opened: January 1983

Passengers
- 2024: 3,480,289

Services
Preceding station	RER	Following station
Aéroport Charles de Gaulle 1 towards Aéroport Charles de Gaulle 2 TGV	RER B	Villepinte towards Robinson or Saint-Rémy-lès-Chevreuse
Future services
Preceding station	RER	Following station
Aérofret towards Aéroport Charles de Gaulle 2 TGV	RER B (2025)	Villepinte towards Robinson or Saint-Rémy-lès-Chevreuse
Location

Parc des Expositions station (French pronunciation: [paʁk dez‿ɛkspozisjɔ̃]) is a station on the RER B's Airport branch. It is in the town of Villepinte in the Seine-Saint-Denis department and serves the Parc des Expositions de Villepinte convention centre. The station is at kilometre 21.01 of the airport branch of the RER B (branch B3). As part of the RER B upgrade, an additional platform is due to be built.

The station sees services between Charles de Gaulle Airport and Robinson or Saint-Rémy-lès-Chevreuse via Gare du Nord in Paris. Also, it will be served by the Paris Metro Line 17 from Saint-Denis–Pleyel to Le Mesnil–Amelot as part of the Grand Paris Express. Trains run every 15 minutes throughout the day, with additional services during the peak hours.
