= Air rail =

Air rail, Air-rail or AirRail may refer to:

- Airport rail link, a type of rail service providing passenger rail transport from an airport to a nearby city or region
- Air-rail alliance, a type of alliance between airlines and railway operating companies
- Air-Rail Link, an automated people mover linking Birmingham Airport and Birmingham International railway station in the UK
- RailAir, a name used by a number of bus and coach services designed to connect the rail network to airports in the UK
