= CDGVAL =

Shuttle rail service at Paris Charles de Gaulle Airport

- CDGVAL train at Terminal 2 station

Overview
- Stations: 5 (1st line); 3 (2nd line)
- Website: French: www.cdgfacile.com

Service
- Rolling stock: VAL 208 NG / NG2
- Ridership: 10,000,000 journeys per year

History
- Opened: 2007 (last extension in 2012)

Technical
- Line length: 4.5 km (2.8 mi)
Route map

CDGVAL is a free shuttle rail service at Paris Charles de Gaulle Airport (CDG), using the VAL (English: automatic light vehicle) driverless, rubber-tyred people mover technology. The first line, which connects the three airport terminals, train stations, and parking lots, opened on 4 April 2007. The second line, which connects Terminal 2 to two satellite terminals, opened on 27 June 2007.

Since 2015, the two lines have been operated by Transdev every day from 4:00 AM to 1:00 AM with bus services running during system closure. The 60 million annual passengers of the airport and its 85,000 employees generate an annual traffic of 10 million journeys on CDGVAL.

== History ==
The CDGVAL project replaced the SK6000 project, which was abandoned after unsuccessful test runs in 1999. CDGVAL was launched in 2000, with construction work beginning in 2003. Total cost is estimated at €145 million.

Charles de Gaulle is Europe's largest airport with an area of 3500 hectares. The airport terminals are relatively far apart. Terminal 2 opened in 1982. At that time links between terminals, including the rail link at Roissypole and the long-stay car parks, were achieved by a shuttle system of buses which progressively became an increasing percentage of airport road congestion. It was not uncommon for the journey between terminals to take nearly half an hour during peak periods. This problem revealed the requirement for a rapid and modern transport solution for airport users. Aéroports de Paris (ADP) planned to overhaul the transport system within the airport perimeter by introducing an internal train link.

The VAL metro system project was launched and project specific infrastructure work commenced shortly afterwards. After the project was under way in 1992, use of the SK6000 train system built by French company Soulé was imposed on ADP by the French government. Infrastructure had to be adapted and Line 1 was now due to open to the public on 1 May 1996. However, during testing the automated rail transit system did not perform as hoped revealing several flaws in the system. Deemed unreliable and incapable of meeting availability targets, ADP were forced to consider alternatives despite the amount already invested which had attained nearly 150 million Euros of state funds. In June 1999 the project was abandoned so ADP had to invest urgently in order to renew its fleet of ageing coaches and maintain road service. SK Line 2, which was due to open during the summer of 1997, was still nowhere near completion after almost one billion Francs invested. A new project codenamed CDGVAL was undertaken in 2000. Building on the original project, CDGVAL largely followed the SK path while adapting existing infrastructure to allow transit of automatic metro-type equipment. Work began in 2003.

Developed by Siemens, this train system has already equipped the French cities of Lille, Toulouse and Rennes, Italian city Turin and formerly, Chicago O'Hare International Airport (VAL256). The company has supplied and installed seven trains with two VAL 208 cars each, automation, the command centre, track-side facilities, electrical installations and cabling, station floors and landings and workshop equipment.

The launch was initially forecast for autumn 2006, ten years after the scheduled opening for the SK6000 line, but the launch still underwent 6 further months delay. The first CDGVAL line opened to the public on 4 April 2007 after a full test run on 19 March 2007. The bus routes ran alongside the new tramway for the first ten days.

A second CDGVAL line, having the project name LISA (Liaison Interne Satellite Aérogare, English: Internal Satellite Airport Link) was opened on 27 June 2007 between Terminal 2E and Satellite S3. It was further expanded to Satellite S4 on 18 June 2012, totalling 1 km (0.62 mi) in length for 3 stations. It is located within the security-controlled area of the airport and therefore accessible only to ticketed passengers and employees.

== Lines ==
=== Line 1 ===
Line 1 serves 5 stations over a total length of 3.5 km and is located landside. The journey takes 8 minutes.

Station	Facilities
Terminal 1	CDG Terminal 1
Parc PR	Parking area PR
Terminal 3 – Roissypole	CDG Terminal 3 Roissypole; Aéroport Charles de Gaulle 1 station
Parc PX	Parking area PX
Terminal 2 – Gare	CDG Terminal 2 Aéroport Charles de Gaulle 2 – TGV station

Official CDGVAL map displaying interchanges.

=== Line 2 ===
Line 2 serves 3 stations over a total length of 1 km and is located airside. The journey takes 4 minutes.

Station	Facilities
Terminal 2E	K Gates
Satellite 3	L Gates
Satellite 4	M Gates

Official CDGVAL-LISA map.

== Connections ==
The RER B commuter line is a heavy-rail service to the Parisian region. CDGVAL connects Terminal 1 passengers from the stop at RER B stop at Terminal 3. Terminal 2 has a train station directly underneath it which has platforms for RER B and high-speed trains (TGV, Eurostar, and Ouigo).

== Gallery ==
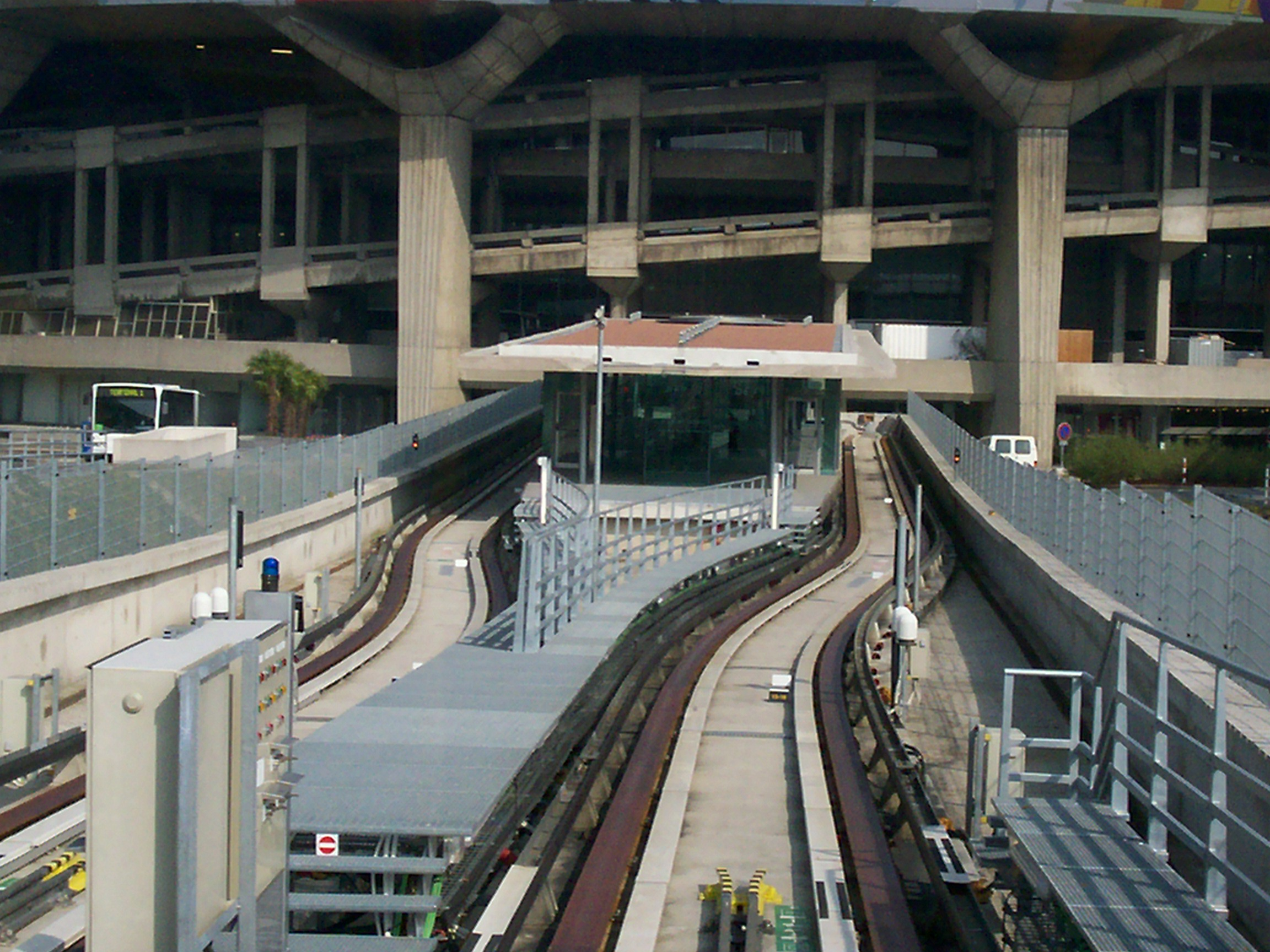
Terminal 1 station

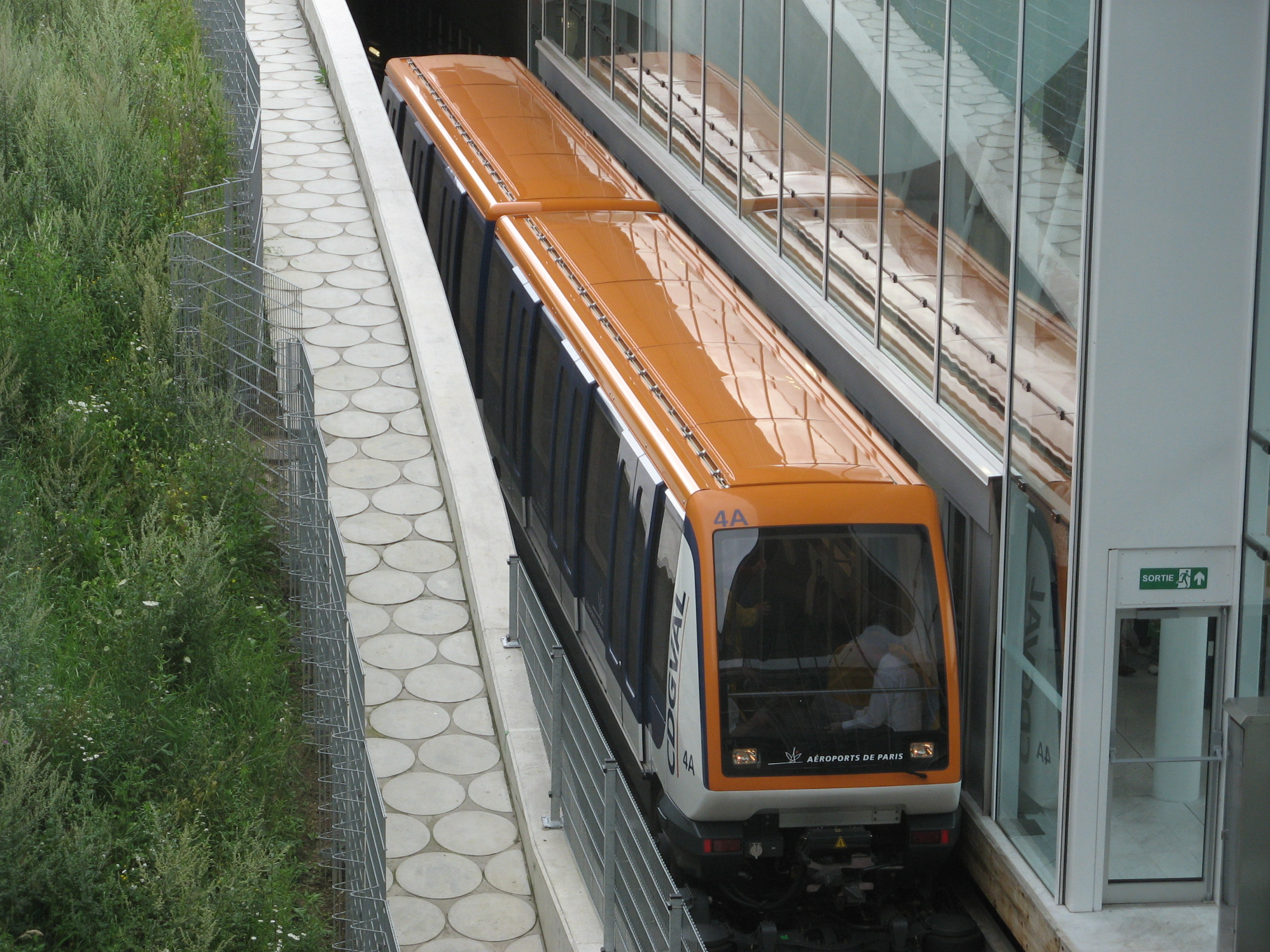
Terminal 2 station exterior

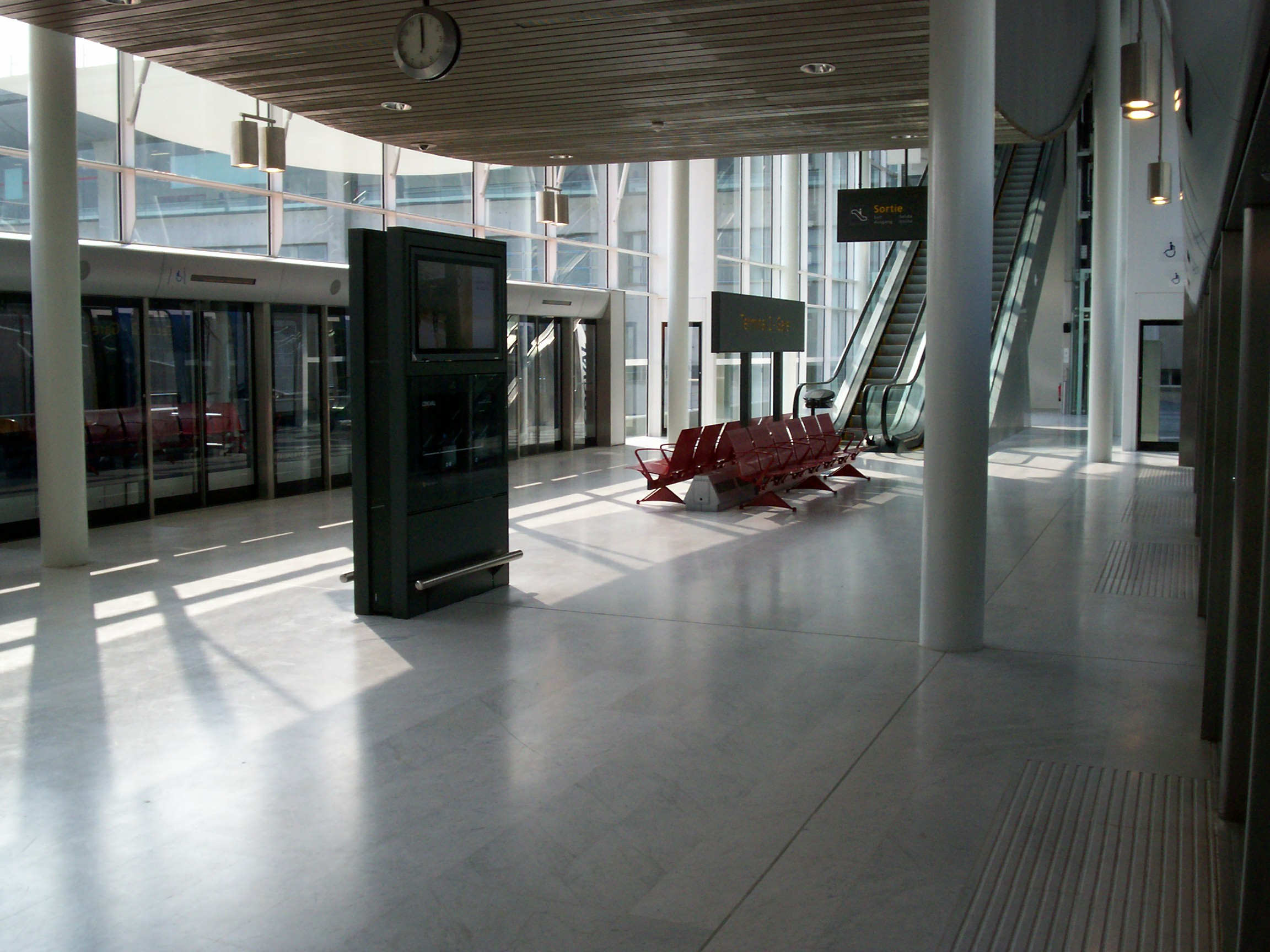
Terminal 2 station interior

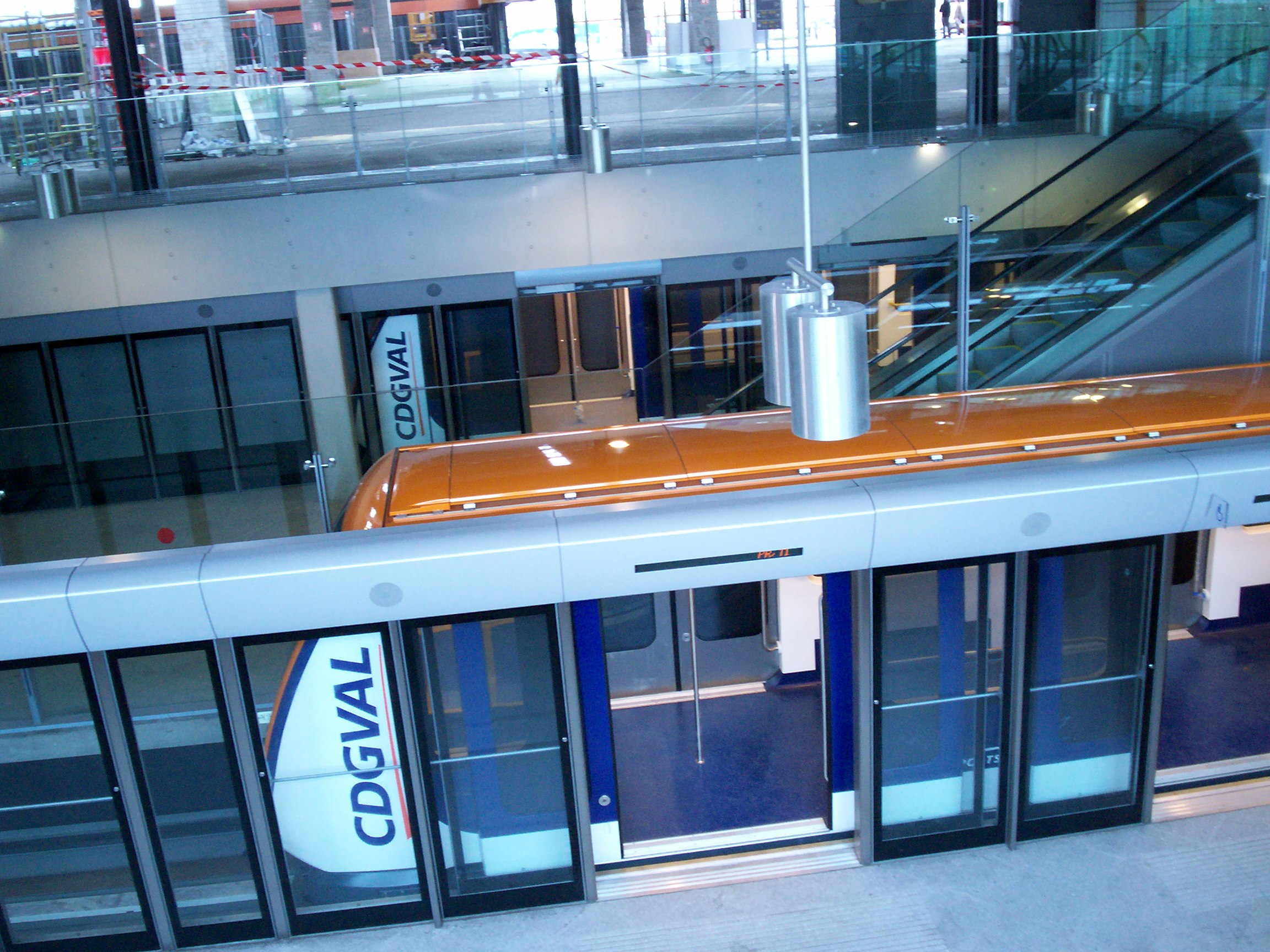
Terminal 3 station

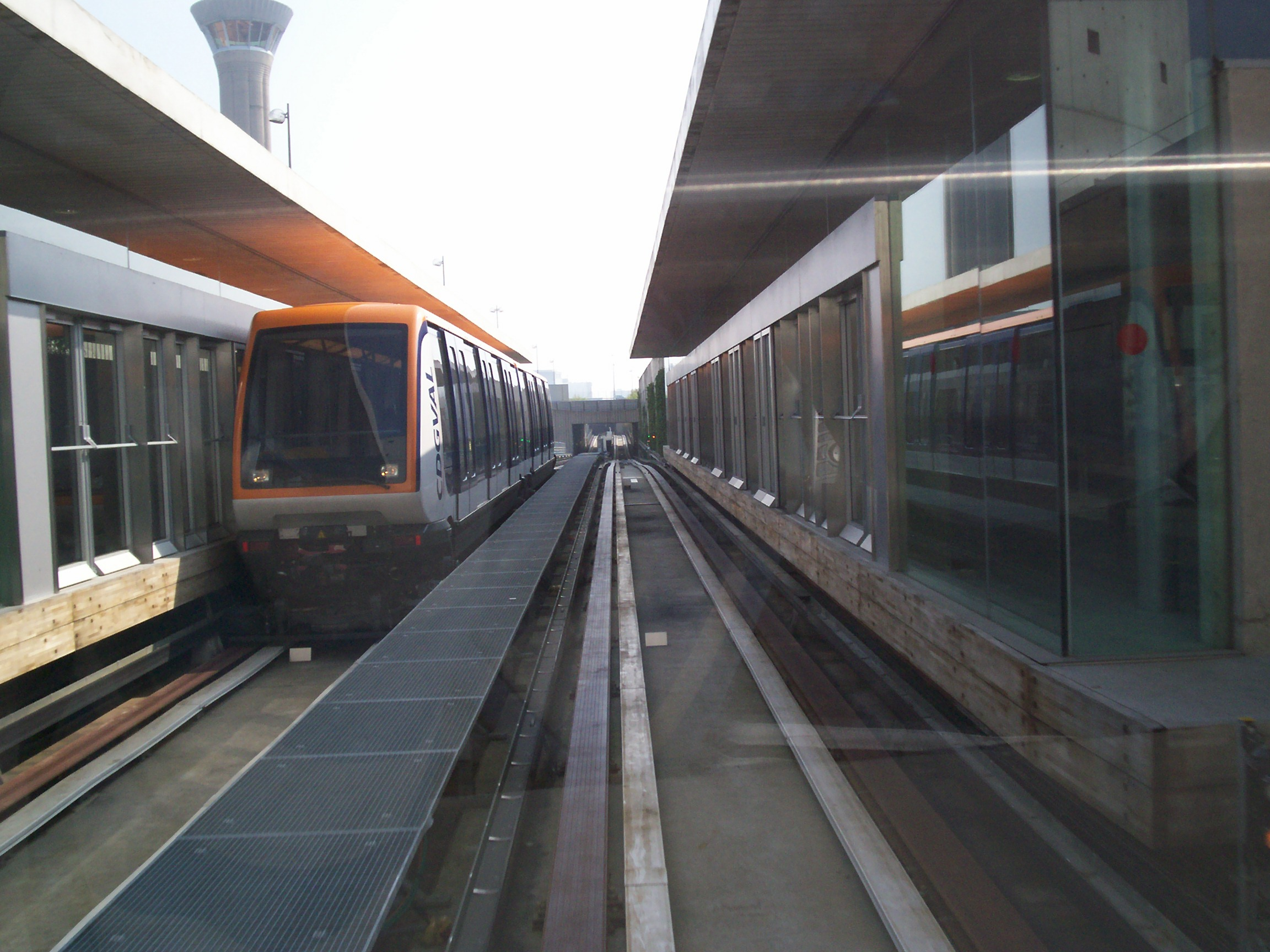
Park PR station looking east

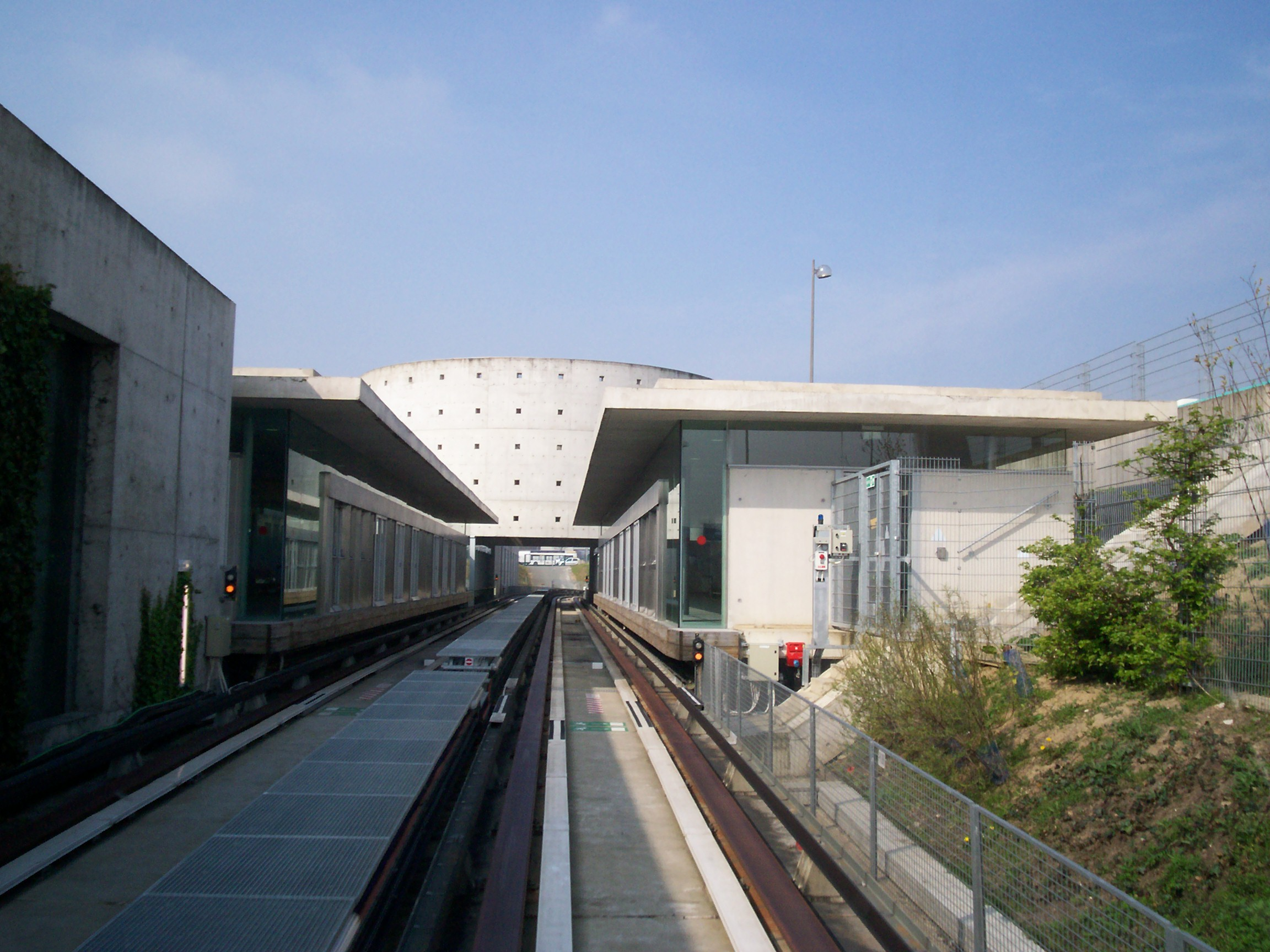
Park PR station looking west

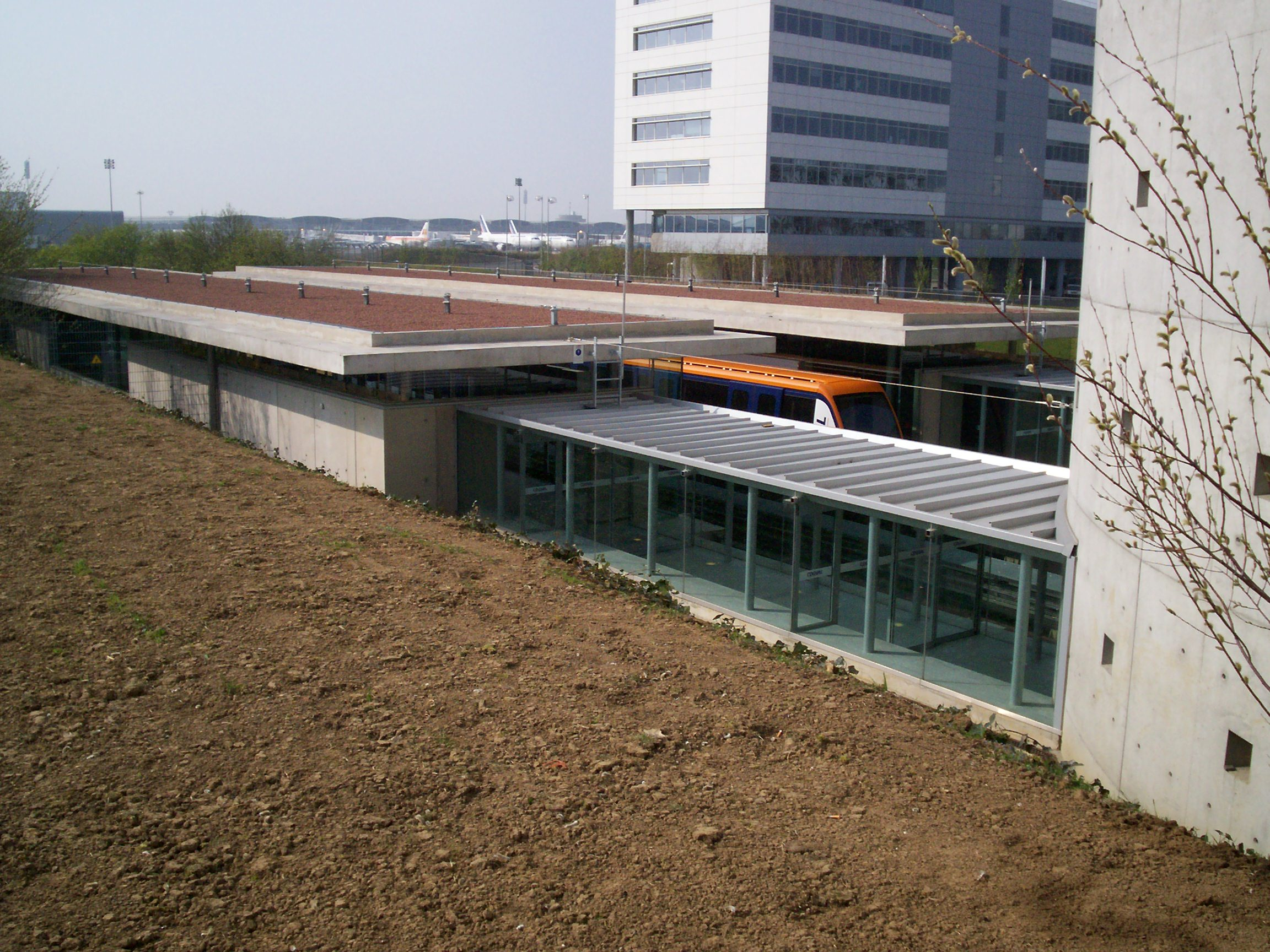
Park PX station

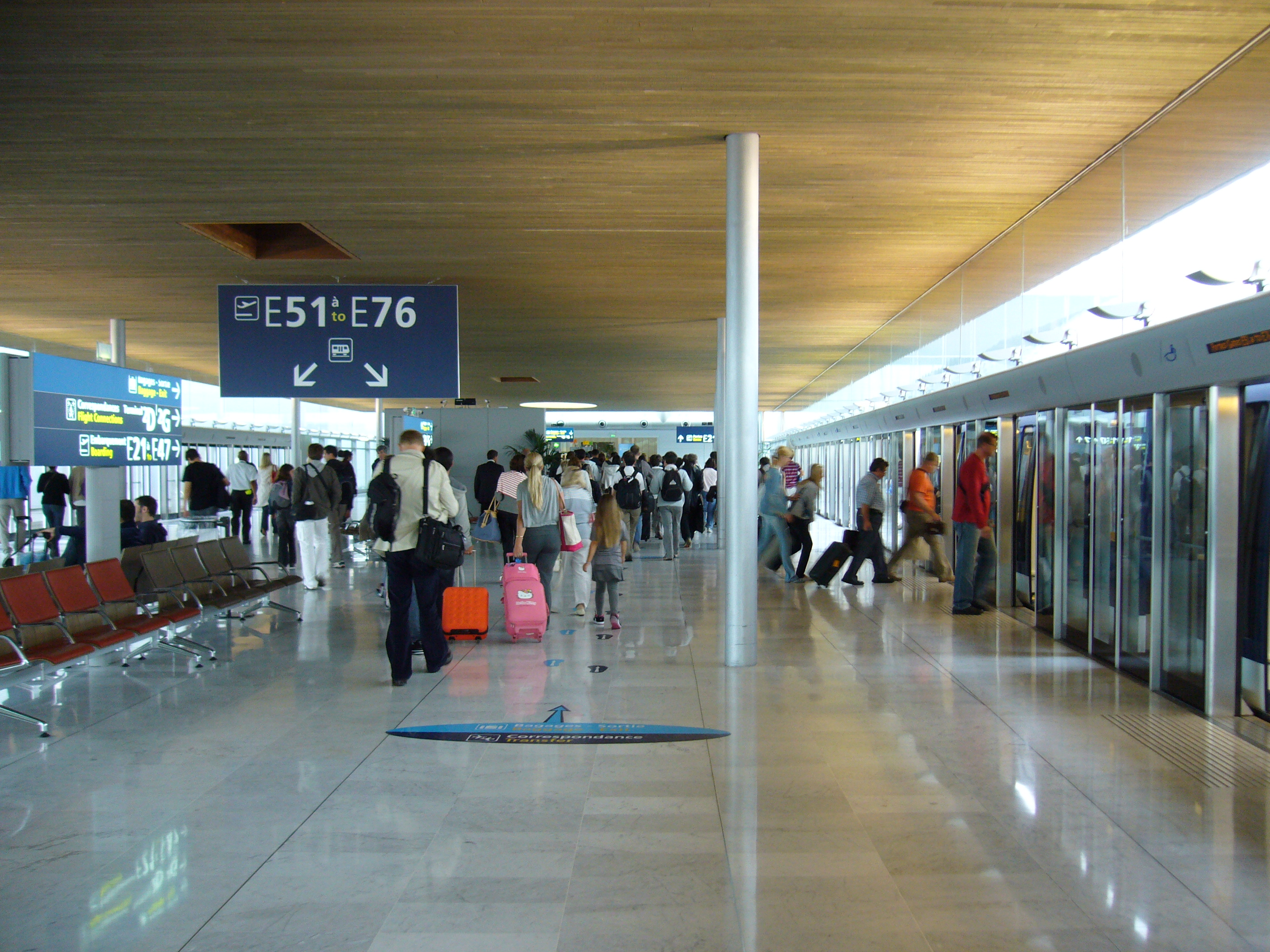
Terminal 2E station

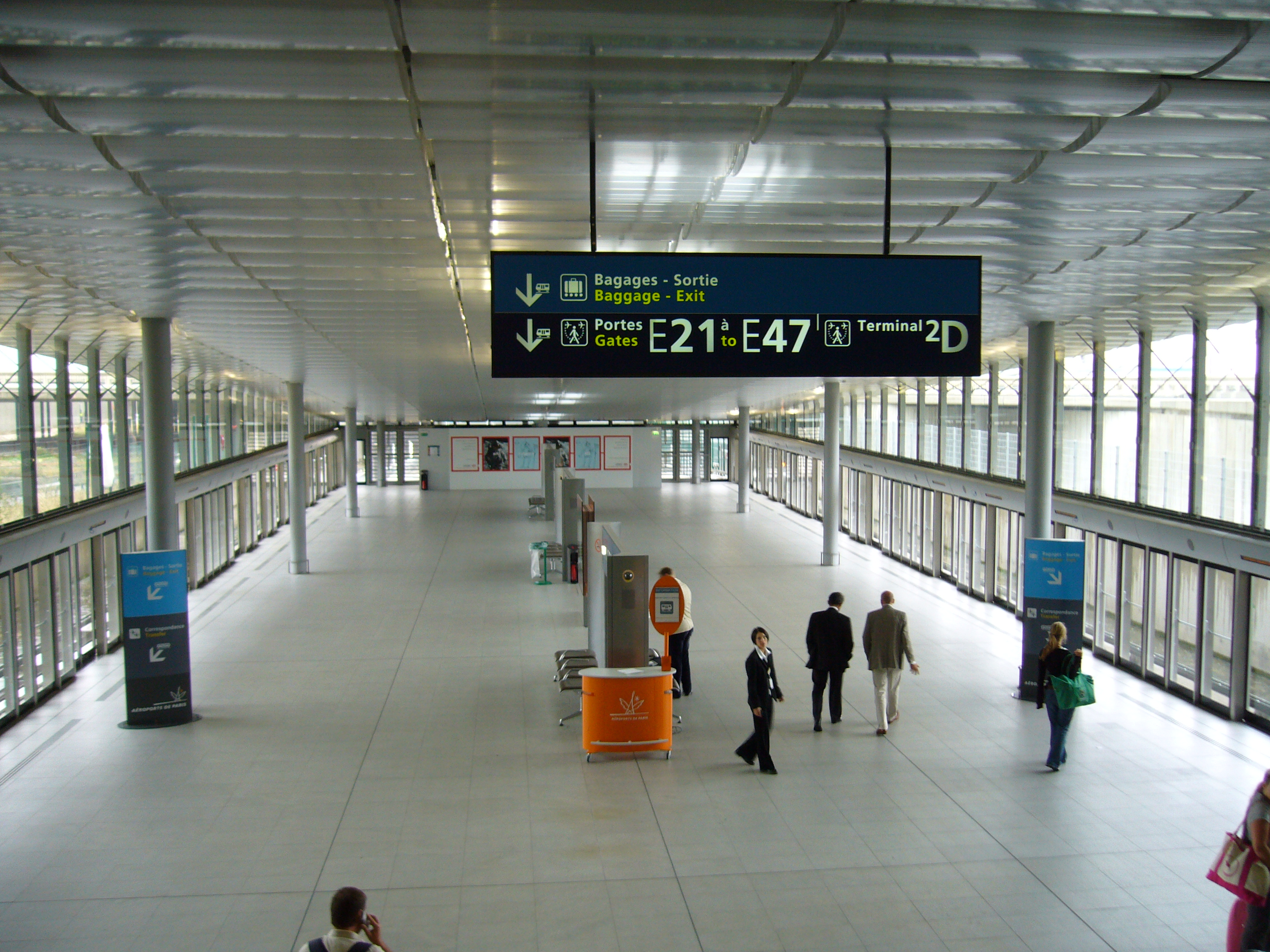
Satellite S3 station

== See also ==
- CDG Express
- Orlyval
