= AIRail Service =

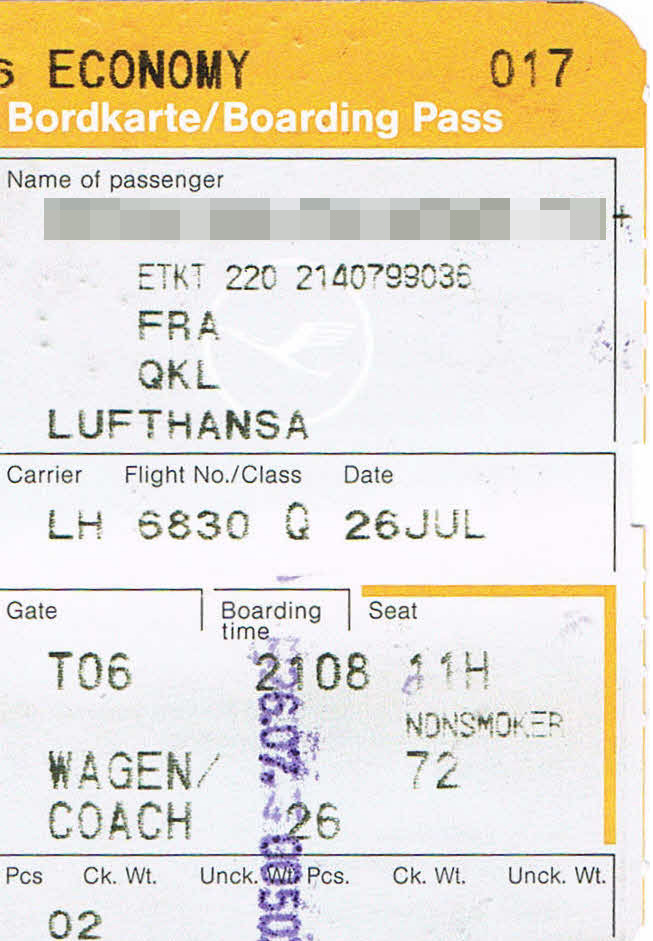
AiRail ticket Frankfurt-Köln Hbf, 2008

AiRail Service is offered by Deutsche Bahn AG in cooperation with Lufthansa, American Airlines and Emirates. It is one example of several dedicated air-rail alliances currently operating worldwide.

AiRail Service is currently offered between Frankfurt (Main) Flughafen Fernbahnhof (the long-distance railway station of Frankfurt International Airport) and 26 cities in Germany which include the central railway stations of Cologne, Dusseldorf and Stuttgart.

Right after arriving at the long-distance train station at Frankfurt Airport, Lufthansa Express Rail customers can quickly and conveniently drop off their baggage and also check in for their flight in the nearby AiRail Terminal.

AiRail Service uses the Cologne-Frankfurt high-speed rail line (maximum speed of 300 km/h) and between Stuttgart and Mannheim (maximum speed of 250 km/h), rendering the train service faster and more reliable than air transport on the same route.

AiRail Service was established as Lufthansa Airport Express in 1982, when Deutsche Bundesbahn (now Deutsche Bahn AG) established a direct connection between Düsseldorf and Frankfurt Airport using the DB 403 "Donald Duck" EMU with tilting technology in Lufthansa livery. In 1990 they established the Stuttgart-Frankfurt connection after the high-speed train line between Stuttgart and Mannheim was opened. Both services were closed due to high cost in 1993. In 2000 they re-established the service between Stuttgart and Frankfurt, now using only some seats in regular cars in standard ICE service.

== See also ==
- Air-rail alliance
- Intermodal passenger transport
