= CDG Express =

Planned railway line in Paris, France

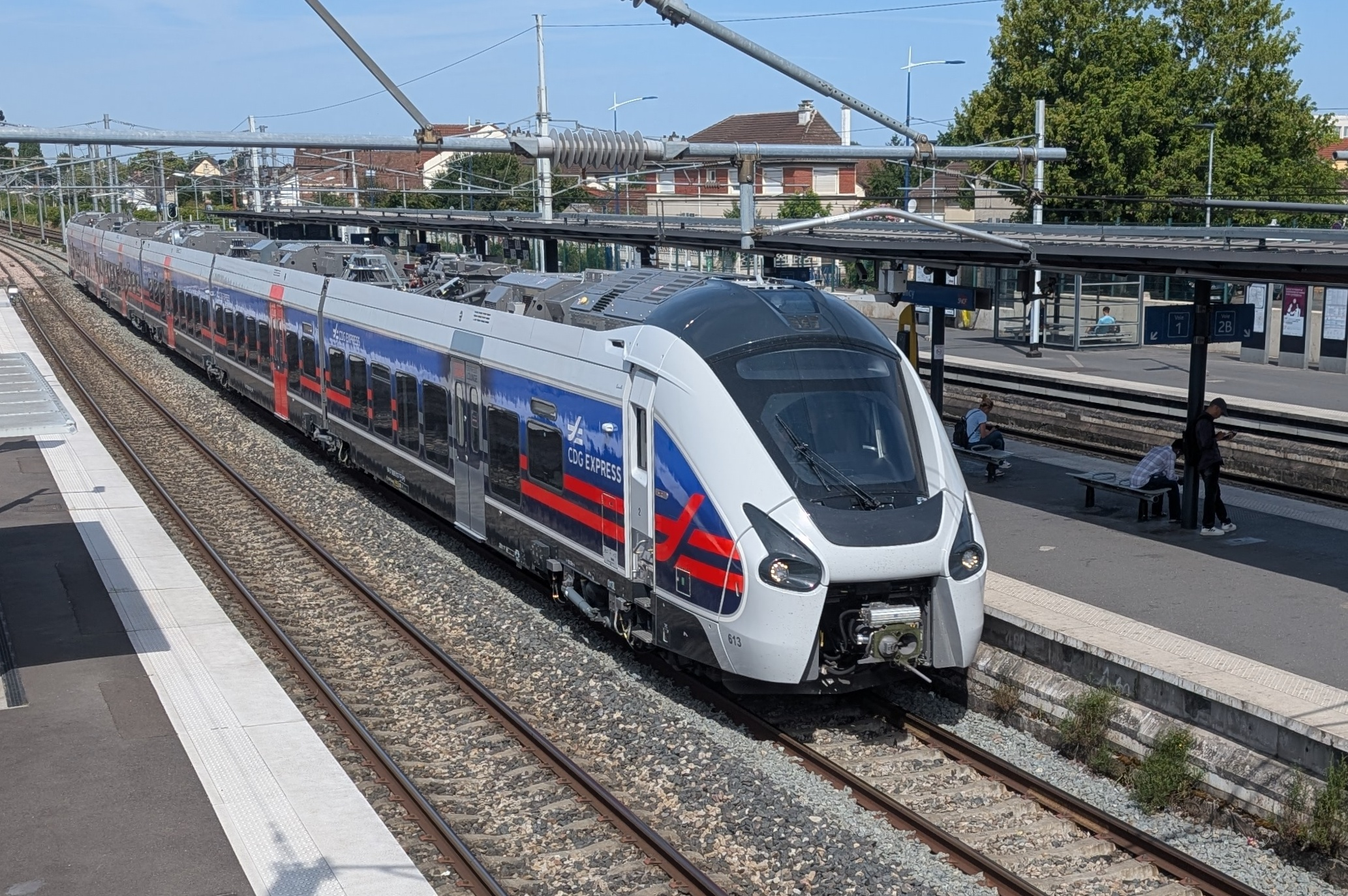
- CDG Express train being tested at Drancy

Overview
- Owner: SNCF and Paris Aéroport
- Locale: Île-de-France
- Termini: Gare de l'Est; Aéroport Charles de Gaulle 2 TGV
- Stations: 2
- Website: cdgexpress.com

Service
- Type: Airport rail link
- Operator(s): Hello Paris (Keolis and RATP Group)
- Rolling stock: Alstom Coradia Liner

History
- Work began: 2018
- Planned opening: 28 March 2027

Technical
- Line length: 32 km (20 mi)
- Track gauge: 1,435 mm (4 ft 8 1/2 in) standard gauge
- Electrification: Overhead catenary
Route map
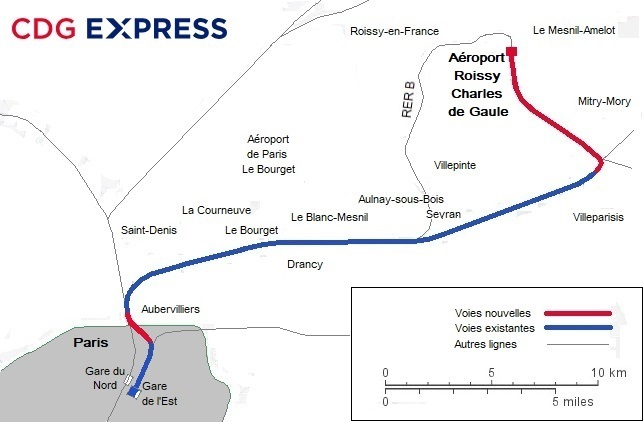

CDG Express is a railway line currently under construction in France. It will connect Gare de l'Est in Paris and Charles de Gaulle Airport, aiming to alleviate congestion on the existing RER B line. Originally planned for 2006, the opening was pushed back several times, most recently to 28 March 2027. Upon completion, passengers can expect to travel between the airport and Gare de l'Est in just 20 minutes, covering a distance of 32 kilometres (20 mi).

== History ==
=== Background ===
Charles de Gaulle Airport is one of few major international airports without an express link to the city centre. The airport is served by RER B, though this line is also heavily used by commuters. 30% of passengers travelling to the airport use RER B.

The airport is also served by high-speed rail, however the TGV station is designed to connect other regions of France to the airport, rather than central Paris.

=== Development ===
In June 2000, SNCF, Réseau Ferré de France and Aéroports de Paris formed CDG-Express, a groupement d'intérêt économique, to develop a high-speed rail link from Paris to Charles de Gaulle Airport. It was proposed to open in 2006.

In July 2008, a consortium of Vinci, Caisse des dépôts et consignations, Axa and Keolis was selected to finance, build and operate the line with a scheduled 2013 opening. In 2011, the government abandoned the plan to have a consortium complete and operate the project.

In 2014, the project was relaunched, with a 50:50 joint venture between SNCF Reseau and Paris Aéroport to build and manage the line. Subsequently an updated DUP (Declaration of Public Utility) was granted and an government loan of € 1.7 billion was approved in 2018.

Following this, a SNCF Réseau, Groupe ADP and Caisse des dépôts et consignations formed a group with equal shares of equity capital of around €450-500 million. The group adopted the CDG Express nomenclature in 2019. In November 2018, the company Hello Paris, a Keolis and RATP Group joint venture, was selected to operate the line for 15 years from January 2024 with a fleet of Alstom Coradia Liners. €537 million would be spent to upgrade and improve RER B, improving reliability for Franciliens.

=== Construction ===
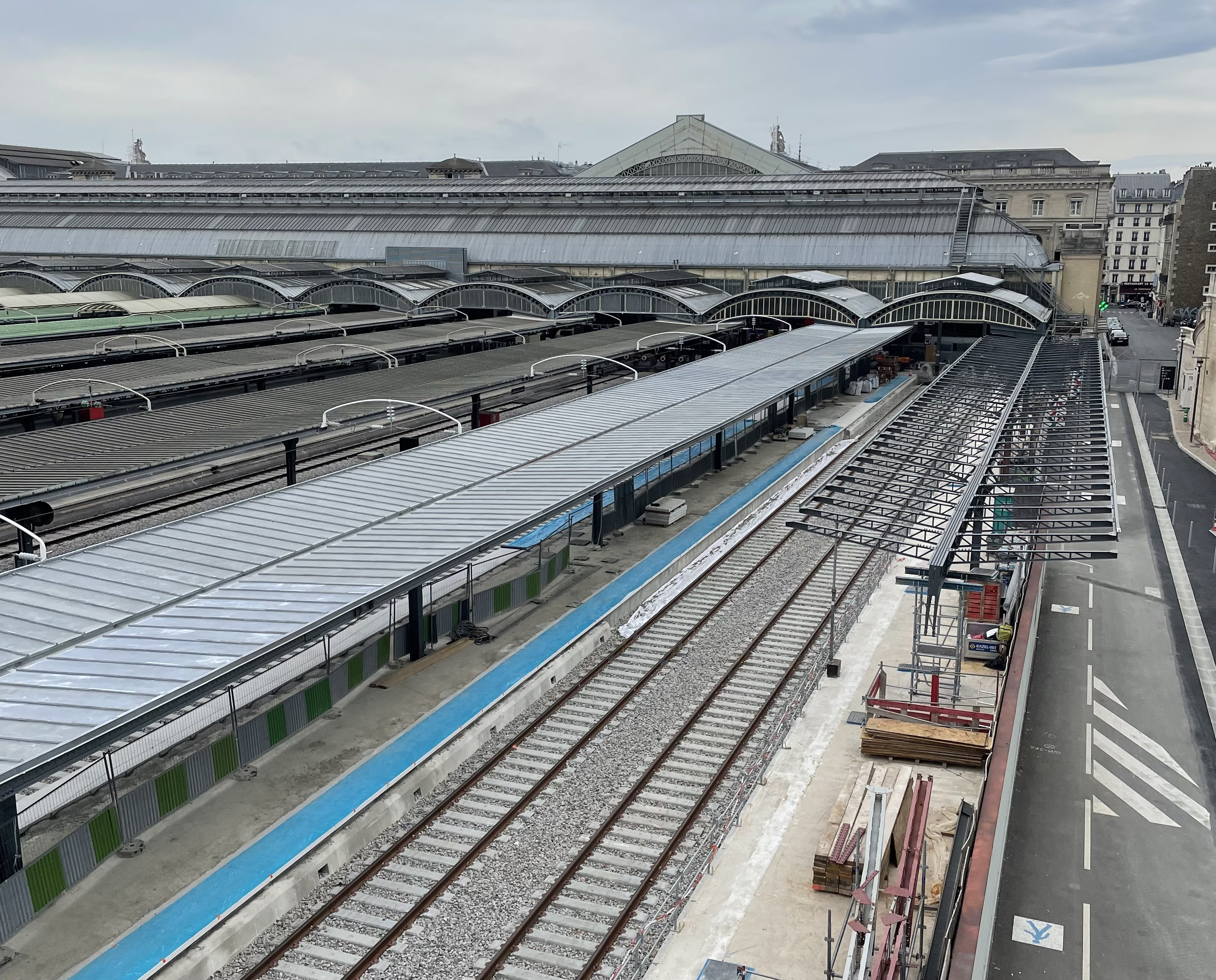
Platform construction for CDG Express at Gare de l'Est.

Construction of the line began in 2018, with an initial completion date of 2023 for the Paris 2024 Olympic and Paralympic Games. On 29 May 2019, transport minister Élisabeth Borne announced the CDG Express would be delayed to late 2025, after the 2024 Summer Olympics, in order to focus on other infrastructure works in the northern suburbs of Paris.

Legal challenges further delayed construction, with work suspended by a court in Montreuil in 2020. In 2022, the Administrative Court of Appeal of Paris permitted work to continue.

Commissioning with opening to the public is currently scheduled for 28 March 2027.

== Description ==
=== Service ===
CDG Express is expected to offer a 20-minute non-stop ride every 15 minutes from 5am to midnight. The new line is expected to take airline customers off RER B, making room for local passengers, and divert 15% of airport automobile trips to rail.

CDG Express will use dedicated platforms at both Charles de Gaulle Airport and Gare de l'Est. Ticket prices will be €25 for a single adult journey or €16.50 for navigo pass holders

=== Route ===
CDG Express will connect Charles de Gaulle Airport to Gare de l'Est in the 10th arrondissement of Paris. Leaving Gare de l'Est, the CDG Express will use 1 kilometre (0.62 mi) of new tracks linking it to the RER B tracks exiting Gare du Nord, before following RER B eastwards for 24 kilometres (15 mi) on tracks upgraded for 140 kilometres per hour (87 mph). After Villeparisis, the CDG Express will turn north on 8 kilometres (5.0 mi) of new tracks to follow the LGV Interconnexion Est high-speed line to the airport itself, with a 400 metres (1,300 ft) tunnel taking it to the existing Aéroport Charles de Gaulle 2 TGV station.

=== Rolling stock ===
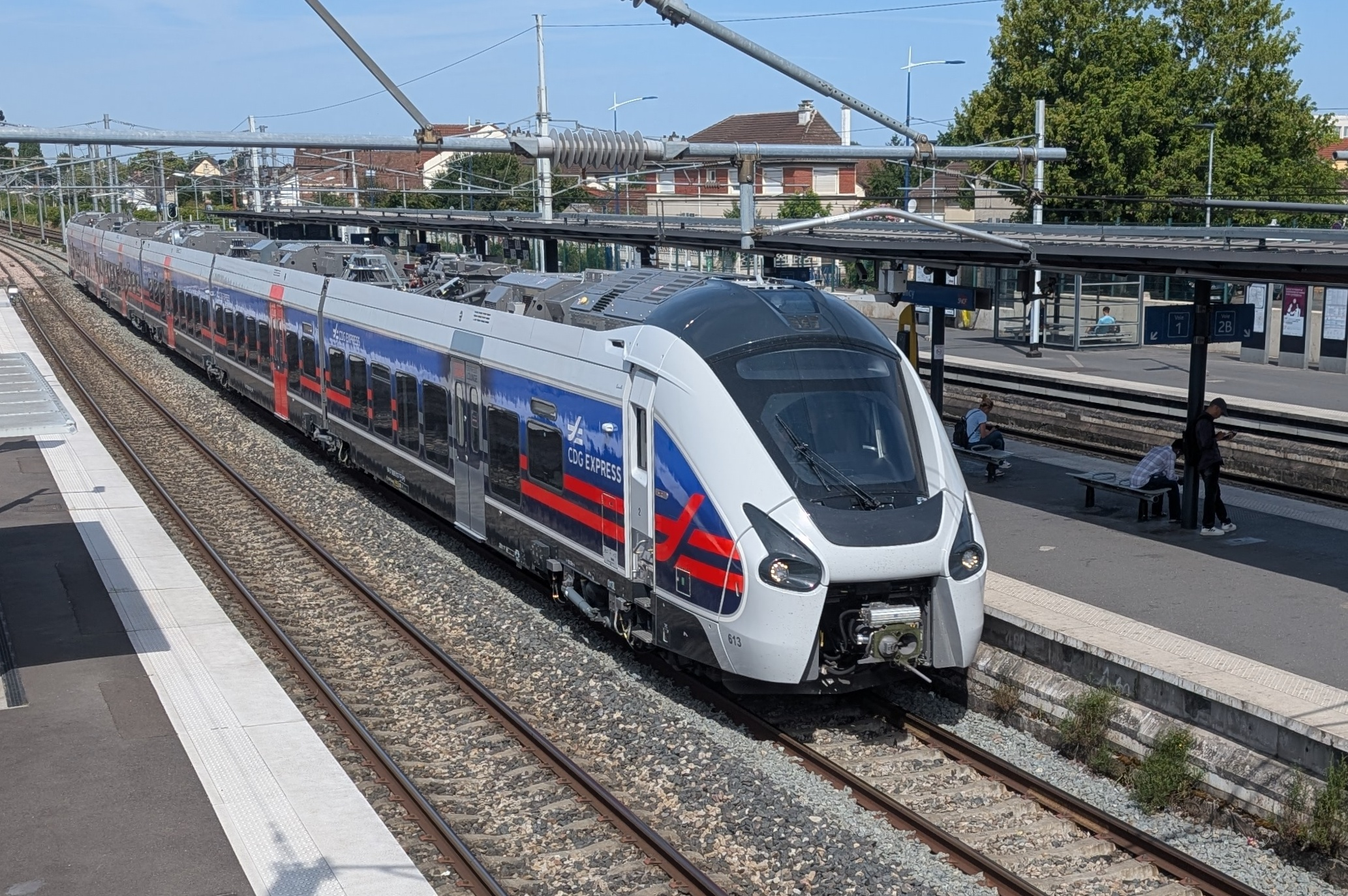
CDG Express Coradia Liner trains during test in Drancy

CDG Express will use Coradia Liner trains.

Hello Paris ordered 6 four-car and 7 six-car trains from Alstom in 2018 at a cost of €160 million. This order was transferred to Construcciones y Auxiliar de Ferrocarriles (CAF) after Alstom purchased Bombardier Transportation. Trains will feature real-time flight information and luggage space.

The first trains were completed in 2022, and some are being stored in Strasbourg pending the opening of the line.
