= Aéroport Charles de Gaulle 1 station =

Railway station at Charles de Gaulle Airport, France

Aéroport Charles de Gaulle 1
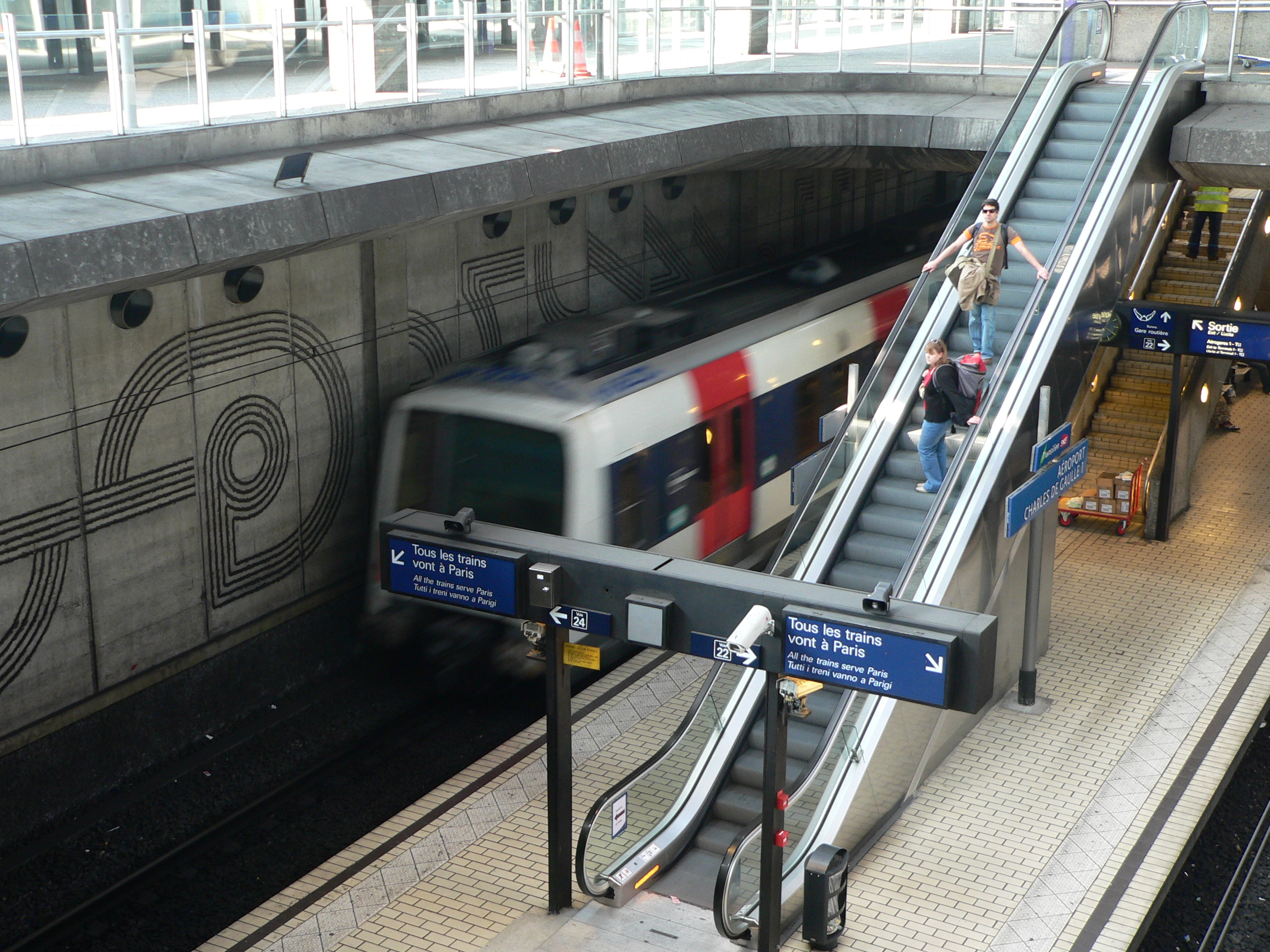
- RER B train enters the station

General information
- Location: Rue de Dublin; Tremblay-en-France; France
- Coordinates: 49°00′36″N 2°33′51″E
- Owner: SNCF and Paris Aéroport
- Operator: SNCF
- Platforms: RER: 2 island platforms CDGVAL: 2 side platforms
- Tracks: RER: 4 CDGVAL: 2
- Connections: Bus

Other information
- Station code: 87271460
- Fare zone: 5

History
- Opened: 30 May 1976
- Rebuilt: 2007, 2018

Passengers
- 2024: 9,054,310

Services
Preceding station	RER	Following station
Aéroport Charles de Gaulle 2 TGV Terminus	RER B	Parc des Expositions towards Robinson or Saint-Rémy-lès-Chevreuse
Preceding station	CDGVAL	Following station
Parking Area PX towards Terminal 2 – Gare	Line 1	Parking Area PR towards Terminal 1
Future services
Preceding station	RER	Following station
Aéroport Charles de Gaulle 2 TGV Terminus	RER B (2025)	Aérofret towards Robinson or Saint-Rémy-lès-Chevreuse
Route map
Location

Aéroport Charles de Gaulle 1 (French pronunciation: [aeʁɔpɔʁ ʃaʁl də ɡol œ̃]) is one of two railway stations at Charles de Gaulle Airport, the primary airport for the Paris region and the largest in France. The station is served by RER B (a hybrid suburban commuter and rapid transit line that offers services to Paris) and CDGVAL (a free rail shuttle service around the airport grounds).

Despite being named after Terminal 1, the station is actually located relatively far from the terminal, but it can be accessed with a short ride on the CDGVAL. Terminal 3 can also be accessed from this station by a five-minute walk on a 300-metre-long (980 ft) pathway. The station is located inside Roissypôle, a development that includes office buildings (including the headquarters of Air France), shopping areas, hotels, and the primary bus station for the airport. Because of its location, the station is named Terminal 3 Roissypôle on maps of the CDGVAL system.

== History ==
The station opened on 30 May 1976, two years after the opening of the airport, as the northern terminal of the SNCF's "Roissy Rail" project (Roissy was the original name of the airport) which would connect the station to Gare du Nord in Paris with trains departing every 15 minutes and making the trip in 19 minutes. Like Terminal 1, the station is built with concrete in the brutalist architecture style, designed by Paul Andreu. Once passengers arrived at the station, they were shuttled to the terminal on a bus.

In December 1981, the Roissy Rail line became part of the RER B, a line of the Réseau Express Régional (RER), a hybrid suburban commuter and rapid transit system serving Paris and its Île-de-France suburbs.

The airport began a major expansion project in the 1980s, with the first section of Terminal 2 opening in 1982. The shuttle bus system was reconfigured to take passengers between the rail station and the new terminal area. Over the coming years, the shuttle bus system began to experience severe delays as road traffic became congested around the increasingly busy airport.

In 1987, the French government decided to build a TGV station at the airport, and in 1989 airport managers agreed to allow the construction of a joint TGV and RER station under Terminal 2, with the RER tracks being extended east and south of this original station. The new station, Aeroport Charles de Gaulle 2 TGV, opened on 24 November 1994.

In 1991, airport managers and the Syndicat des transports Parisiens (the regional transit planning agency, now known as Île-de-France Mobilités) begin a project to connect the terminals and rail stations with an automated rail shuttle service. Construction of the system would take more than a decade, complicated by an aborted attempt to use a new train technology. The CDGVAL (Charles de Gaulle Véhicule Automatique Léger, English: Charles de Gaulle light automatic vehicle) system finally opened on 4 April 2007, linking Terminal 1, parking lot PR, this station, Parking lot PX, and the TGV/RER station at Terminal 2.

The station was renovated in 2018 with a new glass station house that allows more light to enter and a new bus station with 31 bus platforms.

== Gallery ==
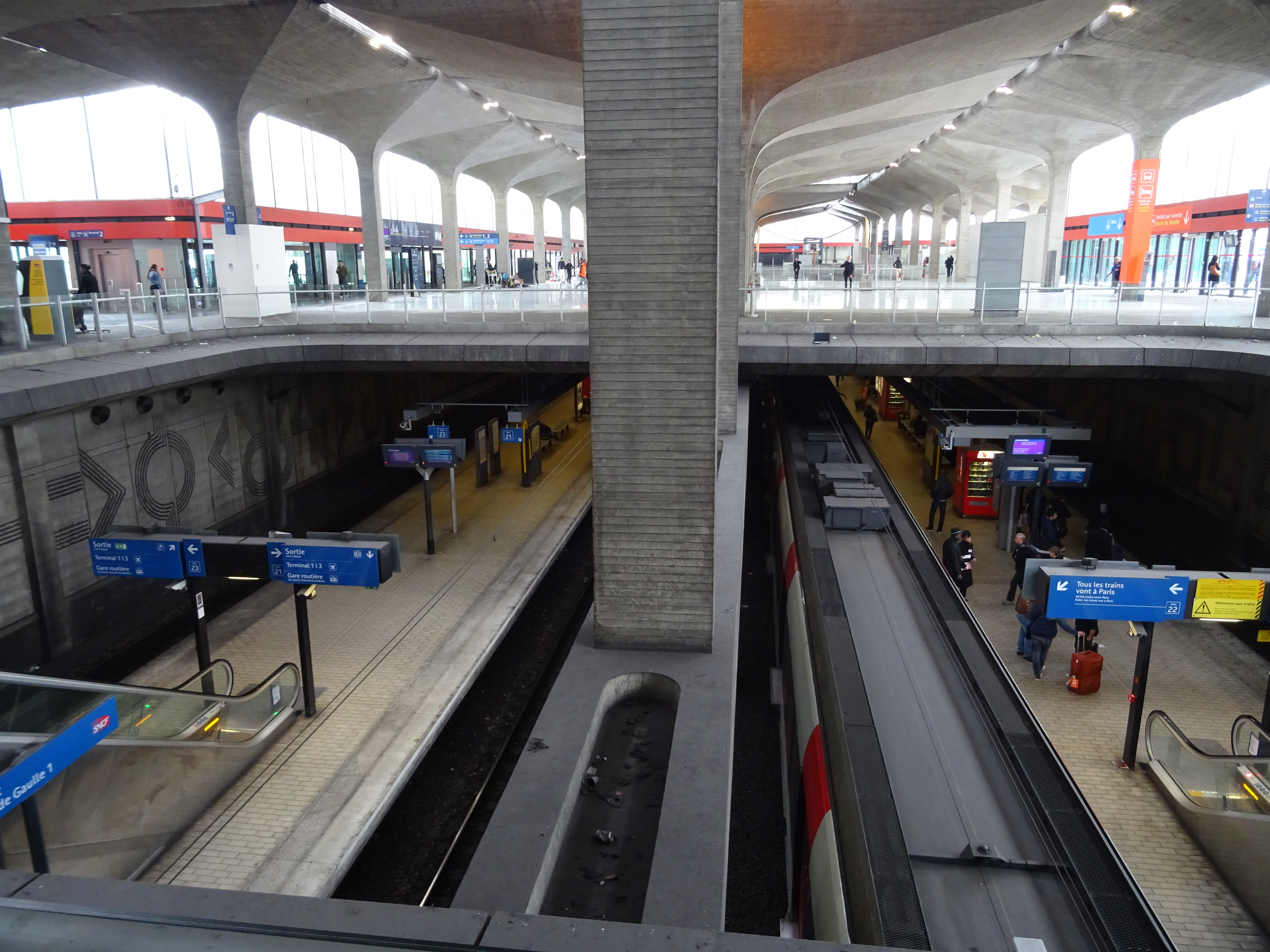
The four RER B tracks and two platforms are visible under the station's concrete canopy

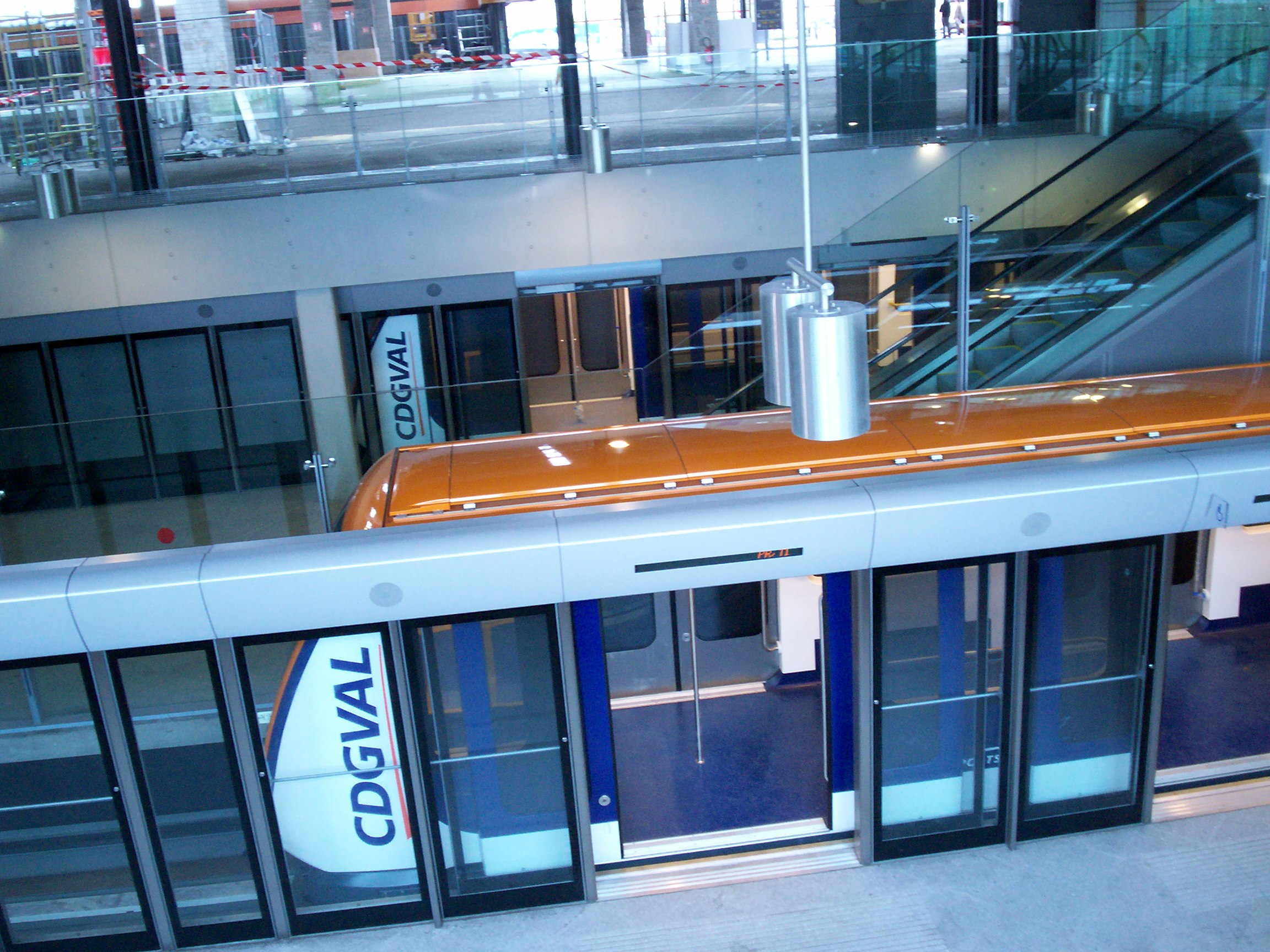
CDGVAL platforms

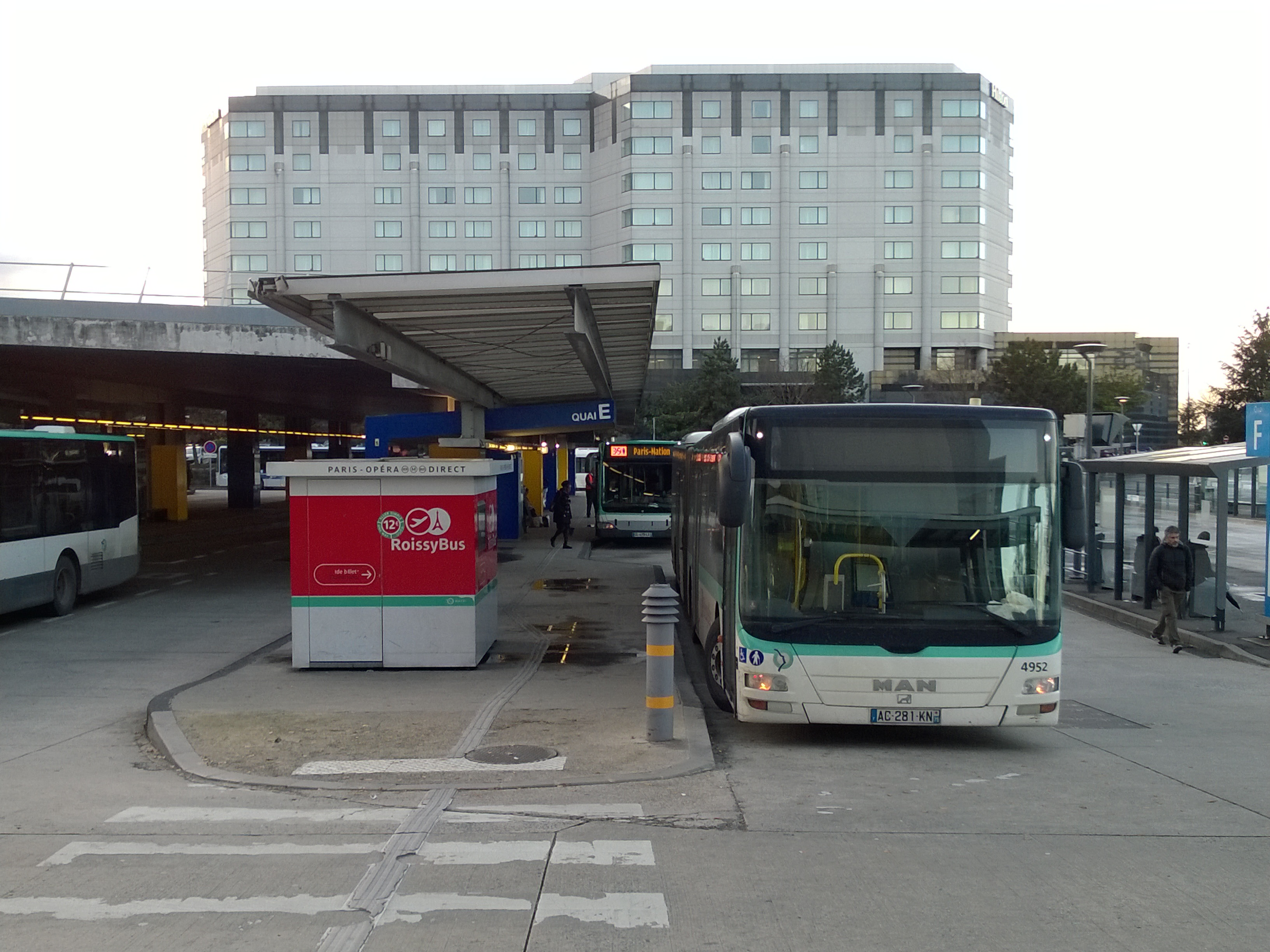
Roissypole bus station
