= Aéroport Charles de Gaulle 2 TGV station =

Railway station in France

Aéroport Charles de Gaulle 2 TGV
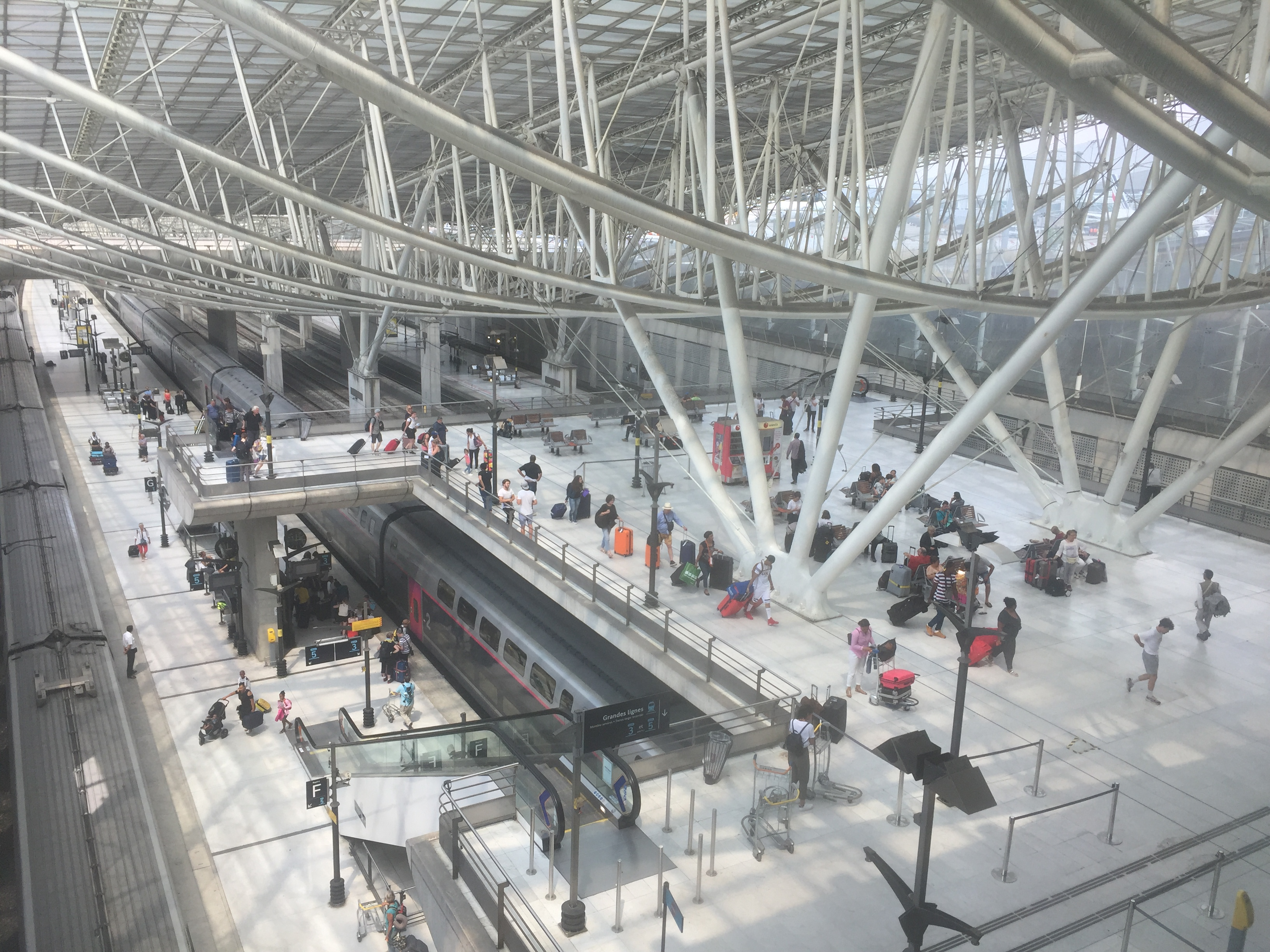
- Interior of the station

General information
- Location: Charles de Gaulle Airport Terminal 2 Roissy-en-France; France
- Coordinates: 49°00′14″N 2°34′16″E
- Owner: SNCF and Paris Aéroport
- Operator: SNCF
- Line: LGV Interconnexion Est
- Platforms: 3
- Tracks: 8

Construction
- Accessible: Yes, by prior reservation

Other information
- Station code: 87271494

History
- Opened: 29 May 1994

Passengers
- 2024: 17,166,603
Services
Preceding station	SNCF	Following station
TGV Haute-Picardie towards Northern France	TGV inOui	Champagne-Ardenne TGV towards Strasbourg
TGV Haute-Picardie towards Northern France	TGV inOui	Marne-la-Vallée–Chessy towards Southeastern France
Preceding station	Ouigo	Following station
Tourcoing Terminus	Grande Vitesse	Marne-la-Vallée–Chessy towards Montpellier Sud de France
TGV Haute-Picardie towards Tourcoing	Grande Vitesse	Marne-la-Vallée–Chessy towards Bordeaux
TGV Haute-Picardie towards Lille-Flandres	Grande Vitesse	Marne-la-Vallée–Chessy towards Marseille
Preceding station	Eurostar	Following station
Disneyland Paris towards Disneyland Paris, Marseille or Bourg-Saint-Maurice	Eurostar	Brussels-South towards Amsterdam Centraal
Preceding station	RER	Following station
Terminus	RER B	Aéroport Charles de Gaulle 1 towards Robinson or Saint-Rémy-lès-Chevreuse
Preceding station	CDGVAL	Following station
Terminus	Line 1	Parking Area PX towards Terminal 1
Route map
Location

Aéroport Charles de Gaulle 2 TGV station (French pronunciation: [aeʁɔpɔʁ ʃaʁl də ɡol dø teʒeve]) is a major passenger railway station in Tremblay-en-France, France. It is directly beneath terminal two of Paris Charles de Gaulle Airport (between the C/D and E/F concourses) and is operated by SNCF. The station was opened in November 1994 by President François Mitterrand. It opened as part of LGV Interconnexion Est, connecting LGV Sud-Est with LGV Nord to bypass Paris. It connects the airport to Paris and to various other cities in France, as well as to Belgium and the Netherlands.

In 2024, 17 million passenger movements were made through the station.

== History ==
In 1987, the French government first set out to build a TGV station at Charles de Gaulle Airport. In 1989, ADP and Air France signed an agreement to construct a TGV and RER station within terminal 2 of the airport. The station was officially inaugurated on 2 November 1994, and services began on 13 November.

Though about 2.5 million passengers were projected to use the station annually at opening, only 500,000 used the station in 1994-1995. The projected level was reached in 2004, when 2.4 million passengers used the station, of which two thirds were making air-rail connections.

Since 4 April 2007, the station has been served by the CDGVAL, connecting it to other terminals and to the parking lots.

In 2018, construction began on the CDG Express, which will provide a high-speed, direct TGV connection from to the station to Paris Gare de l'Est. After numerous delays, the opening of the link is now set for 28 March 2027.

== Train services ==
Both TGV and RER B trains stop at the station, and it is a terminus of the RER B (B3). The station is situated on the LGV Interconnexion Est and TGV trains from the station go to Angers, Besançon, Bordeaux, Dijon, Le Mans, Lille, Lyon, Marseille, Montpellier, Nantes, Poitiers, Rennes, Strasbourg and Tours.

The RER line B offers a connection to the centre of Paris, a journey of approximately 30 minutes.

== Station layout ==
The station has 5 levels, with the highest level, 5, being on street level with bus connections. Level 4 has connections to all three airport terminals, 1, 2, and 3. Level 3 has flight information, while Level 2 contains shops, tickets, and public restrooms. Level 1, the lowest level, has train platforms.

== Gallery ==
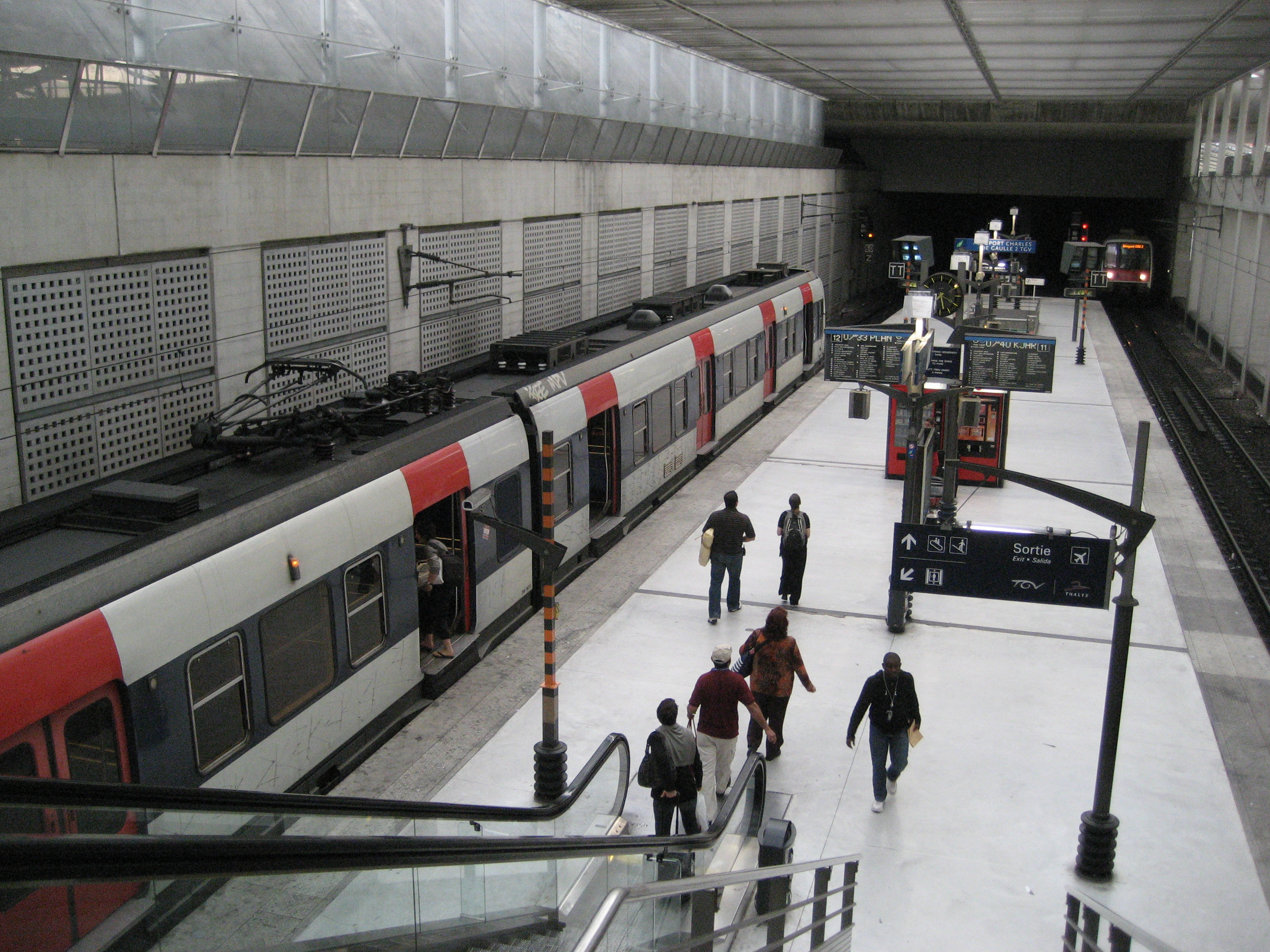
RER B platforms of the station.

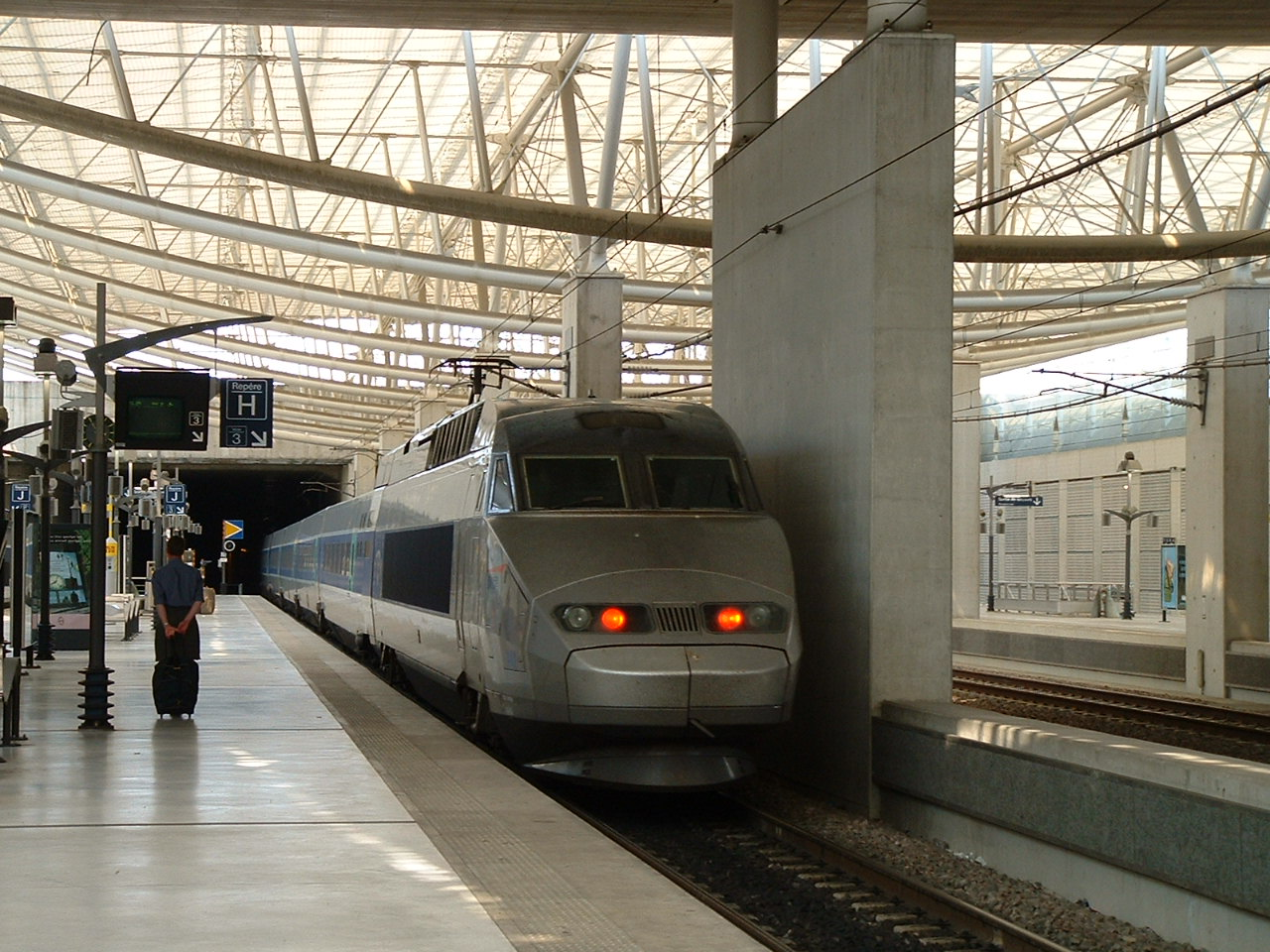
A TGV at the station
