= Air-rail alliance =

Partnership between airlines and railway companies

There are four main types of airline-railway business alliance or codeshare agreements: dedicated services, entire network access, Night&Fly, and re-protection agreements. The currently active air-rail alliances are listed in the tables below.

== History ==
On 1 August 2022, German railway company Deutsche Bahn (DB) became the first intermodal partner of the Star Alliance, as an extension of the Lufthansa Express Rail (AiRail) program that then existed for more than 20 years. All 26 member airlines of the Star Alliance can include DB ICE trains with flight numbers in their booking systems, to buy a combined ticket for the flight and the inner-German train in one booking step. This includes (business class) access to DB lounges, points or miles for the train journeys in the frequent-flyer programs and baggage handling in the AiRail check-in at Frankfurt Airport.

In September 2024, high-speed rail operator Eurostar signed a memorandum of understanding to join SkyTeam as its first non-airline partner. This cooperation will enable integrated intermodal transport (air-rail) in the UK, France and the Netherlands.

== Dedicated services ==
Dedicated services are less common than Rail&Fly alliances, due to the level of service provided. Often checked through luggage is provided between the air and rail journeys, dedicated carriages or entire trains are provided to airline passengers, and service is to the same level expected on board an aircraft, including meals and refreshments.

Train Operating Company	Airline	From Airport	To City	Marketed As
Amtrak	United Airlines	Newark Liberty International Airport	New Haven, CT; Philadelphia, PA; Stamford, CT; Wilmington, DE	
CRH	China Eastern Airlines	Shanghai Hongqiao International Airport	Shanghai-Hangzhou; Shanghai-Wuxi	China Eastern Air-Rail Service
Deutsche Bahn	Lufthansa; American Airlines; Emirates	Frankfurt Airport	Stuttgart; CologneSiegberg/Bonn / Kassel Wilhelmshöhe / Karlsruhe main station	AIRail
ÖBB	Austrian Airlines	Vienna International Airport	Linz; Salzburg	AIRail
SBB	Swiss International Air Lines	Zurich Airport	Basel	Airtrain
SNCF	Air France	Paris-Charles de Gaulle Airport	Brussels-Midi; Strasbourg	Air & Rail
Thalys	KLM	Amsterdam-Schiphol Airport	Antwerp-Centraal; Brussels-Midi	
Thalys	American Airlines	Paris-Charles de Gaulle Airport	Brussels-Midi	

== Entire network access ==
More commonly referred to as Rail & Fly due to the popularity of the Deutsche Bahn service, entire network access is the increasingly common form of air-rail alliance. This allows passengers to book a discounted (sometimes free) train ticket in addition to their full-price air ticket. Checked through luggage and dedicated train compartments for airline passengers are not normally available, though sometimes first class train travel is provided. Travel is usually available to the entire rail network.

Train Operating Company	Airline	From Airport	To	Marketed As
Comboios de Portugal	TAP Portugal	Lisbon Airport, Porto Airport, Faro Airport	All of Portugal, long-distance trains only	Rail&Fly Portugal
Deutsche Bahn	Lufthansa # Aeroflot; Air Astana # Air China; Air India; Air Malta; Air Mauritius; Air Moldova; Air Transat; Alitalia; American Airlines # All Nippon Airways; Asiana Airlines; Belavia; Bulgaria Air; Cathay Pacific Airways; China Airlines; China Eastern Airlines; Condor # Croatia Airlines; Cyprus Airways; Egyptair; El Al Israel Airlines; Emirates # Ethiopian Airlines; Etihad Airways; Finnair # Gulf Air; Hainan Airlines; Iberia; Icelandair; Iran Air; Japan Airlines; Korean Air; Kuwait Airways; LATAM; Mahan Air; Malaysia Airlines; MIAT Mongolian Airlines; Middle East Airlines; Oman Air; Pakistan International; Qantas # Qatar Airways # Rossiya Airlines; Royal Air Maroc; Royal Jordanian Airlines; S7 Airlines; Singapore Airlines; South African Airways # SriLankan Airlines; Syrian Arab Airline; LATAM Brasil; TAP Portugal; TAROM; Thai Airways; TransAer; TUIfly.com # Tunisair; Turkish Airlines; Ukraine International; Uzbekistan Airways; Vietnam Airlines; Yemenia	Frankfurt Airport; Basel Airport; Berlin Brandenburg Airport; Bremen Airport; Dortmund Airport; Dresden Airport; Düsseldorf Airport; Hamburg Airport; Hannover Airport; Leipzig/Halle Airport; Köln-Bonn Airport; München Airport; Münster-Osnabrück Airport; Nürnberg Airport; Stuttgart Airport	All Deutsche-Bahn-stations (including some in Austria and Switzerland), and select private railway services in Germany	Rail&Fly
ÖBB	Air Moldova #	Vienna International Airport	Linz, Salzburg, Innsbruck, Bregenz, Graz, Klagenfurt and St. Pölten	Air & Rail Austria
ÖBB	Emirates #	Vienna International Airport	All ÖBB-trains in Austria except EN Euro Night	Rail & Fly in Austria
Taiwan High Speed Rail	China Airlines; EVA Air; China Eastern Airlines	Taoyuan International Airport; Taipei Songshan Airport; Kaohsiung International Airport; Taichung Airport	All of Taiwan - HSR only	
SNCF	Air France; Gulf Air; Air Austral; Air Tahiti Nui; American Airlines; Cathay Pacific; Middle East Airlines; Emirates; Etihad Airways; Qatar Airways	Paris-Charles de Gaulle	All of France - HSR only	TGVair

♯ Indicates airlines offer Rail&Fly ticketing on company website

== Airline-Rail re-protection agreements ==
Also known as "Good for Trains", this is an emergency backup service for airline cancellations, providing train tickets in lieu of flights to get passengers to their destination. Such an example was during the Eyjafjallajökull eruption in 2010, where extra trains were provided to support the airlines’ stranded passengers in Europe. These 'good for train' agreements are in place with the following airlines:

Country	Train Operating Company	Airline
(Canada)	Via Rail	Air Canada
(Germany)	Deutsche Bahn	Lufthansa

== See also ==
- List of IATA-indexed railway stations
- Codeshare agreement
- Airport rail link
