= ESIEE Amiens =

Engineering graduate school in Amiens, Somme, France

- École Supérieure d'Ingénieurs en Électrotechnique et Électronique d'Amiens
- Motto: Inventer le futur
- Motto in English: Let's invent the future
- Type: French Graduate School of Engineering (Grande École)
- Established: 1992
- Director: Pierre Loonis
- Students: 450
- Undergraduates: none
- Postgraduates: French equivalent of a Master's Degree
- Location: Amiens, France
- Website: http://www.esiee-amiens.fr

The ESIEE Amiens (previously named École supérieure d'ingénieurs en électrotechnique et électronique) is a French Graduate School of Engineering located in Amiens delivering the equivalent of a master's degree. The school was established in 1992 and is part of the ESIEE network.

The school is ISO 9001 certified by Bureau Veritas for its engineering formation. Since its founding, the school is accredited by the Commission des titres d'ingénieur to issue the engineering degree called Diplôme d'Ingénieur.

== General Information ==
Approximately 80 of the 450 students graduate every year in Amiens. The admittance is made after the baccalaureate through a competitive examination, or at the end of preparatory classes. Students with a bachelor's degree in science have also the possibility to integrate the school to follow the engineering cycle.

=== Course ===
The total course lasts five years and is divided into two cycles:

- The preparatory cycle
- The engineering cycle

The preparatory cycle lasts 3 years where all the students follow the same course, this period aims to give both competences (knowledge and methodology) in basic sciences (mathematics and physics) and engineering sciences to the students. The engineering cycle lasts 2 years where the students in Amiens have the opportunity to choose a specialization among the following subjects:

- Building services engineering
- Computer networks and telecommunications
- Electrical engineering and sustainable development
- Manufacturing systems

Some students have also the possibility to pursue their last two years at ESIEE Paris in order to follow one of the specialization offered there.

=== Campus ===
The campus is situated in the French region of Picardy in the centre of the prefecture: Amiens.

== University Partnerships ==
Hereafter is a list of some of the Universities where the students at Amiens have the opportunity to study three months, six months or a full year depending on the university chosen.

- (Argentina) - Universidad Nacional de San Juan
- (Brazil) - Universidade Estadual de Campinas
- (Canada) - École Polytechnique de Montréal
- (China) - Tsinghua University
- (England) - Brunel University
- (England) - King's College London
- (England) - University of Southampton
- (Germany) - Karlsruhe Institute of Technology
- (Republic of Ireland) - Dublin Institute of Technology
- (Italy) - Politecnico di Milano
- (Poland) - Poznań University of Technology
- (Sweden) - Chalmers University of Technology
- (Switzerland) - École Polytechnique Fédérale de Lausanne
- (United States) - California Institute of Technology
- (United States) - University of Florida

== Student Union and Clubs ==
Each year a Student Union is elected. The Student Union called BDE is in charge of organising events and enhancing the contact and team-spirit between students. Other clubs such as a junior enterprise, humanitarian association, robotic club or sports club are part of the students' life at ESIEE Amiens.

== Notable alumni ==
- Régis Lacote (1997), CEO of Orly Airport

== See also ==
- Grandes écoles
- Education in France
- Engineering education
