= ISTM =

ISTM may refer to:

- Former name of ESIEE Management (Institut Supérieur de Technologie et de Management)
- International Society of Travel Medicine, an international organization on travel health initiative promotion
