= ESIEE Paris =

Engineering grande école in Marne-la-Vallée, France

Coordinates: 48°50′24″N 2°35′02″E

- École Supérieure d'Ingénieurs en Électrotechnique et Électronique
- Motto: L'école de l'innovation technologique
- Motto in English: The schools of technological innovation
- Type: Grande école
- Established: 1904; 122 years ago
- Affiliations: Université Gustave Eiffel, Paris Île-de-France Regional Chamber of Commerce and Industry, Conférence des Grandes Écoles
- Director: Jean Mairesse
- Students: 2,000
- Postgraduates: 400 engineers / year
- Location: Marne-la-Vallée, France
- Website: esiee.fr

ESIEE Paris (French: École Supérieure d'Ingénieurs en Électrotechnique et Électronique, lit. 'School of Engineering in Electrotechnics and Electronics') is a grande école of engineering located in Marne-la-Vallée. The school was established in 1904 and is part of the ESIEE network of graduate schools.

ESIEE Paris offers its students general engineering training with the aim of enabling them to design, produce and oversee complex industrial systems while meeting strict economic constraints and dealing with an international environment. To accomplish this, the school renders advanced scientific and technological training, which is frequently updated to keep pace with changes in the leading edge technologies and supplemented by its association with language, general culture, economics and humanities teaching.

ESIEE Paris belongs to the Paris Île-de-France Regional Chamber of Commerce and Industry. The school is also a member of the Conférence des Grandes Écoles, and Université Gustave Eiffel. The 'modernist' school building located at Marne-la-Vallée has been designed and conceived by the famed French architect Dominique Perrault.

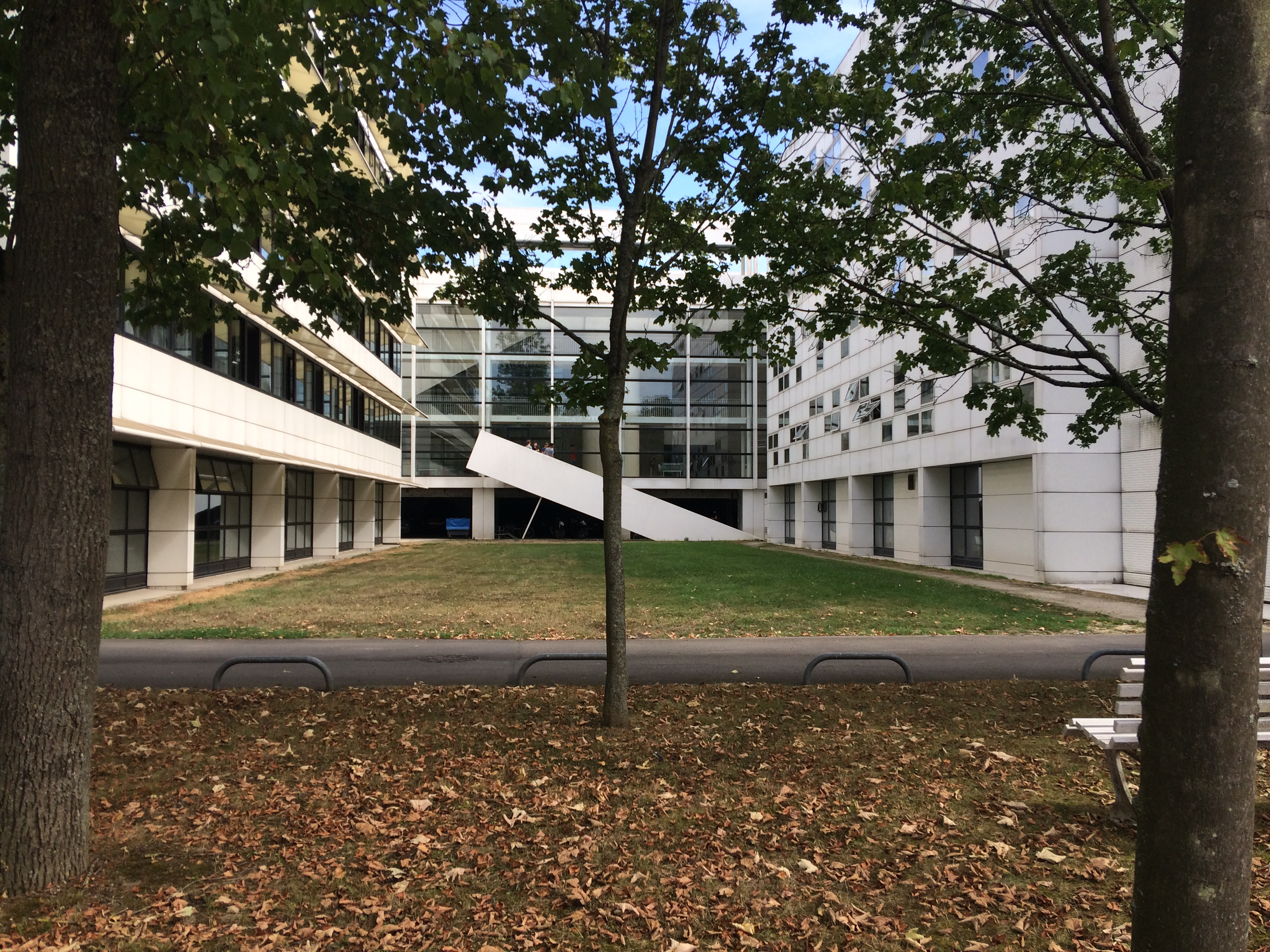
ESIEE Paris

== History ==
It was founded in 1904 and was known until the 1960s as the Breguet school. Created in 1904, under the patronage of a family whose three generations contributed to the progress of electricity in the nineteenth century, their descendants accepted that the new school be called Breguet School. The school, from its inception, is intended to constitute in the field of science and technology of electricity, the equivalent of what had been for a long time, the National Schools of Arts and Crafts for mechanics, and delivers an engineering degree.

Recognized by the State by decree of January 3, 1922, the order of diploma is signed by the Minister of Supervision in 1926. Following the law of July 10, 1934, which specified the conditions of issue and the use of the title of qualified engineer, the Breguet School continues to appear on the list of establishments entitled to issue the title of engineer, after three years of consecutive studies at an entrance examination, aligned with the admission requirements of similar public schools.

At the very beginning, in 1904, it was not about electronics, let alone about computers and systems, but about electricity and mechanics. As the technical and technological evolution progressed, the School's teaching was adapted. Terrestrial television and radio courses appeared in the 30s and 40s and were replaced and strongly developed after the war under the general term of electronics. The scientific and technical education, supplemented by a broad general education allowed some 4 000 engineers from the 60 promotions, to adapt to all the circumstances of their professional life. Breguet is found in a wide range of industries, in its first place, obviously, in electrical or mechanical construction, electronics, aeronautics, but also in national services such as EDF, public works, transport, etc.

In 1960, the Chamber of Commerce and Industry of Paris, anxious to add to its teaching work a training of engineers, chose Breguet School, which developed from then into a wide collaboration company-school. The last class of engineers from École Breguet was released in 1965. In 1968, the School became known as ESIEE - École Supérieure d'Ingénieurs en Électrotechnique et Électronique. However, the first engineers with the title of ESIEE engineers came out in 1966.

It is presently operated by the Paris Chamber of Commerce. Some of the students come directly from high school and graduate after five years while others, who follow the traditional path to the Grandes écoles, come from a preparatory classes and graduate in three years.

Since 2021, the engineering school is a member of Université Gustave Eiffel since the declaration of the French Prime Minister, Jean Castex. The school remains a school of the Chamber of Commerce and Industry (Décret n° 2020-1747 du 29 décembre 2020).

== Academics ==
Approximately 400 of the 1,800 students in Paris graduate every year and 60% of them have spent at least three months studying or working outside France. Depending on their specialization, they can attend classes in its 650 m^{2} (7000 ft^{2}) clean room. In 1991, it is known as the first engineering school to have students design and launch an artificial satellite, named SARA - Satellite Amateur de Radio Astronomie, as part of extracurricular work in ESIEESPACE, a student club. During the last two years, students choose a specialization among the following subjects:

- Computer science
- Signal processing and telecommunications
- Network engineering
- Electronics and microelectronics
- Embedded systems
- Manufacturing systems engineering

ESIEE launched several masters of science programs in nano-science, MEMS, electronic engineering and system on a chip, programs to which international students and 4th and 5th-year ESIEE students may participate.

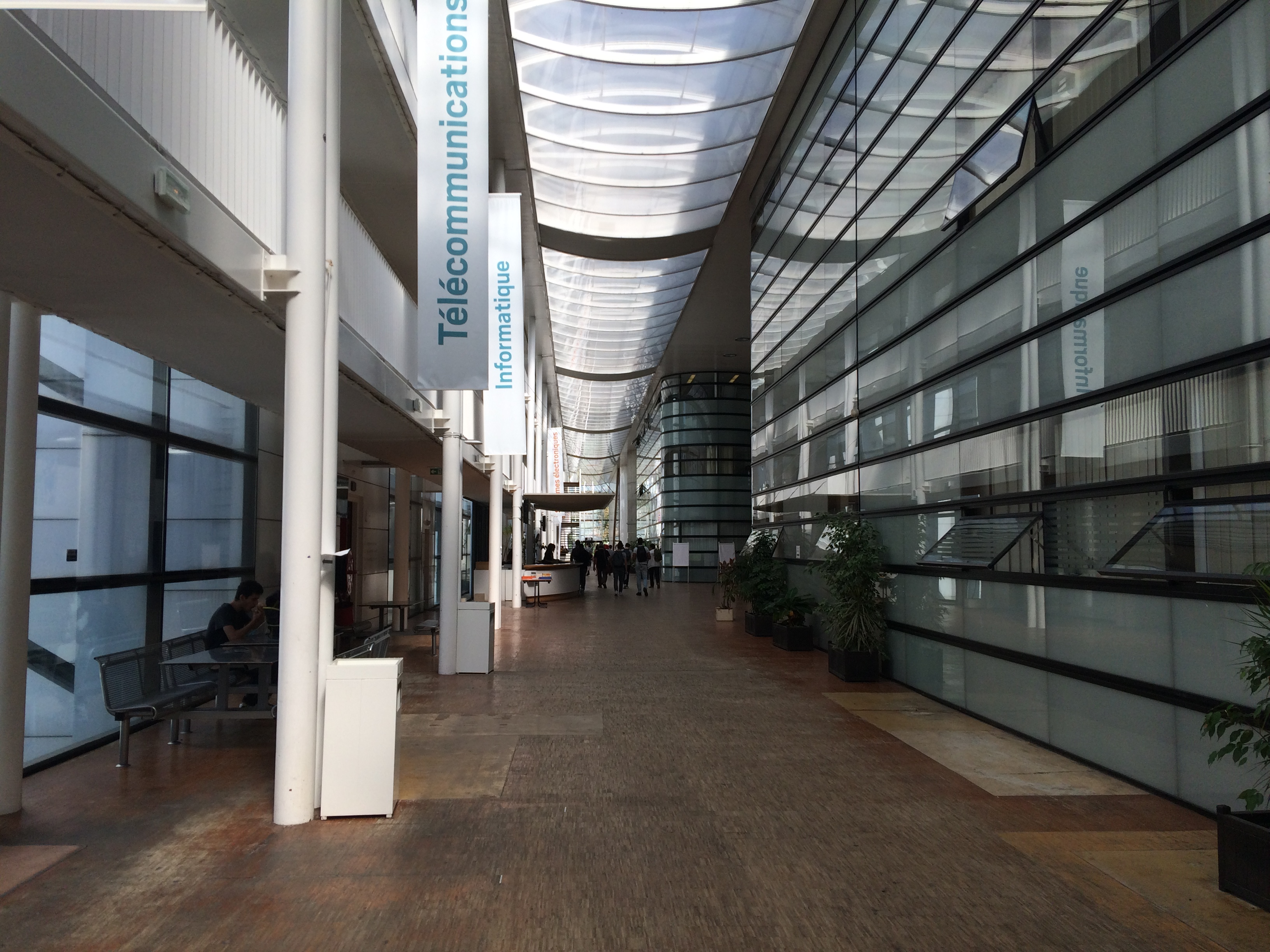
During the last two years at ESIEE Paris, students choose a specialization among the following subjects: Computer science, Signal processing and telecommunications, Network engineering, Electronics and microelectronics, Embedded systems, Manufacturing systems engineering etc.

=== Ranking ===
- L’Etudiant 2020 ranking list – ESIEE Paris is takes/holds 27th place in general ranking list and also makes part of schools in Group A.
- 5th best higher education institution and joint-1st higher education institute of Ile-de-France
- Joint-2nd based on company links
- Joint-1st of higher education institutions of Ile-de-France based on academic excellence
- Eduniversal ranking list of best higher education general engineering schools 2019-2020: no. 1 in Ile-de-France et 6th in general ranking
- L'Usine Nouvelle 2020 ranking list: ESIEE Paris gains 9 places and rises to 23rd position out of 122 ranking schools
- U-Multirank 2019 international ranking list: ESIEE Paris placed as 8th best French establishment in Science and Technology out of 236 globally-ranking universities
- Happy At School® 2020 ranking list: 6th best engineering school in this brand-new ranking list based exclusively on student opinions

=== Partnership agreements with international institutions ===
In addition to the European Erasmus Programme, two main exchange programs are offered to the students:

- The Tripartite Programme, offered to outstanding candidates, operates with the Karlsruhe Institute of Technology, the University of Southampton, and the ICAI in the Universidad Pontificia Comillas. Under this program, students spend their last two years in two universities of their choice.
- The Entree Programme, allows students to transfer to 17 other European universities. Under this program, students spend the first semesters of the last two years in two universities of their choice.

Hereafter is a list of some of the universities where students of ESIEE Paris have the opportunity to study:

- (Brazil) - Federal University of Minas Gerais
- (Canada) - École Polytechnique de Montréal
- (Canada) - Université Laval
- (Canada) - Université du Québec à Montréal
- (Canada) - Université de Sherbrooke
- (China) - Beijing Jiaotong University
- (China) - Xidian University
- (Germany) - University of Freiburg
- (Germany) - University of Ulm
- (Italy) - Politecnico di Milano
- (Italy) - Politecnico di Torino
- (Italy) - Sapienza University of Rome
- (Mexico) - Tecnológico de Monterrey
- (Poland) - Warsaw University of Technology
- (Spain) - UPC - Universitat Politècnica de Catalunya
- (Sweden) - Chalmers University of Technology
- (United Kingdom) - Brunel University
- (United Kingdom) - Heriot-Watt University
- (United Kingdom) - University of Exeter
- (United States) - Georgia Institute of Technology
- (United States) - University of California, Irvine
- (United States) - University of New Mexico

== Research ==
ESIEE Paris is thoroughly invested in 5 primary research areas :

- Informatics, Image Analysis, Signal Depiction
- Sensors, Health, Energy and Environment
- Electronics and Communications
- Embedded Systems, Networks and Manufacturing
- Management of Innovation Technologies

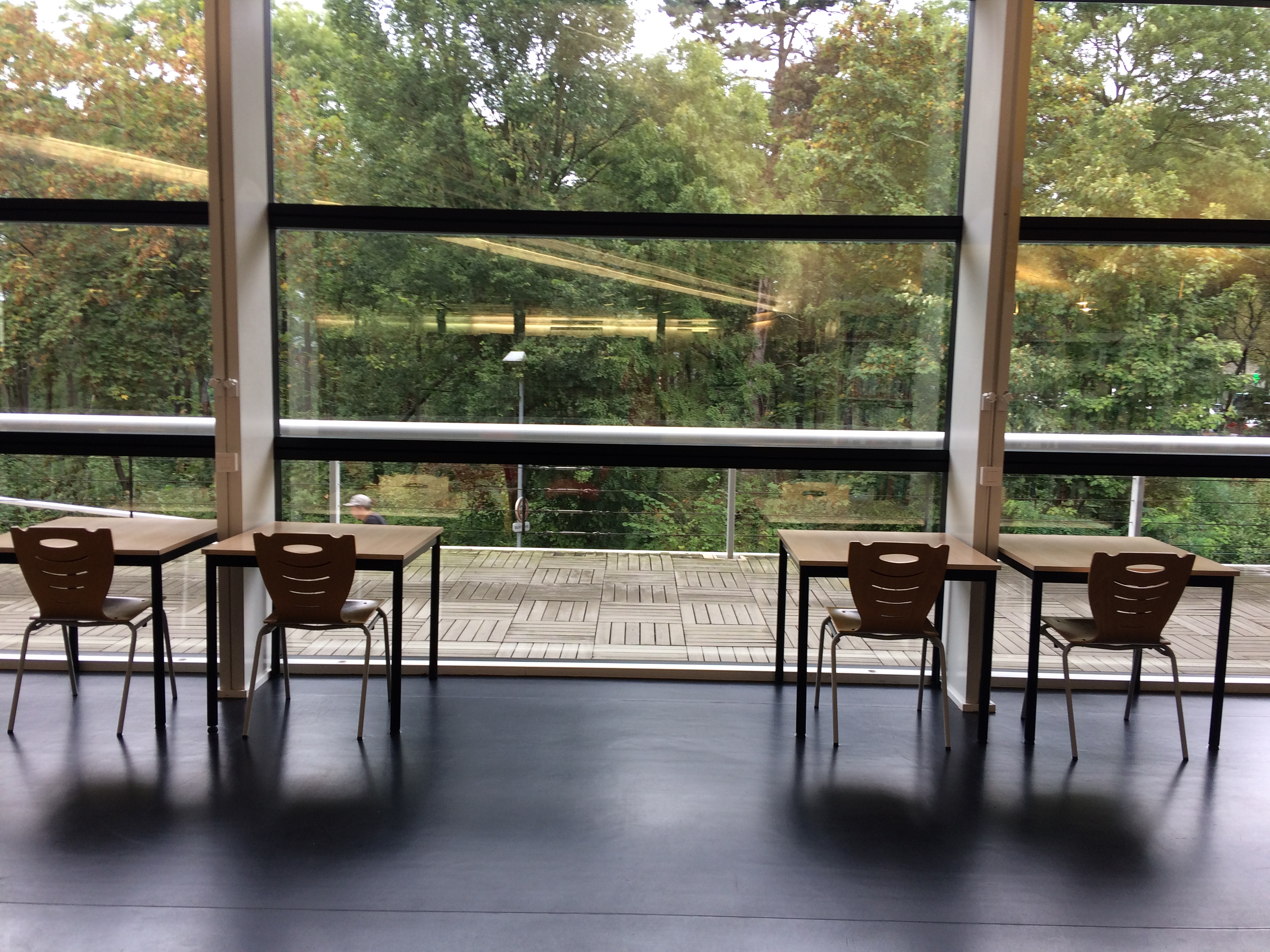
ESIEE Paris Library

=== Informatics, Image Analysis, Signal Depiction ===
Having had many industrial collaborations, with the likes of General Electric, Siemens or Sagem, as well as with high-tech startup companies, the joint work of the Department of Computer Science with Siemens research (Princeton) has been rewarded by three thesis prizes. The department has several research activities including Architecture and parallelism for image processing and virtual reality, Discrete geometry, computational geometry, Mathematical morphology and image processing, Optimisation, modelling and machine learning & Signal processing etc.

=== Sensors, Health, Energy and Environment ===
The research activity in this area is focused, primarily on the issues of sustainable cities and the well-being of the person. While considering the assortment of data that sensors can deliver, 'Examination Microsystems' is more intense than straightforward sensors. At the point when lessened to the 'Lab-on-chip' scaled down configuration, they turn out to be minimal effort and gain a critical place for supportable city instrumentation. The EquipEx ‘SenseCity' project is well-regarded in this context.

== Notable alumni ==
- Marcel Dassault (Breguet 1912), founder of the Dassault Group
- Jacques Becker(Breguet 1920), French film director
- Charles Monier (Breguet, 1925), French aviator and part of Free French Air Forces
- Michel Lechevallier (1971), Director Purchasing, Supply Chain at Schneider Electric
- Gonzague de Blignières (1979), former co-chairman of Barclays Private Equity Europe and former president of Barclays Private Equity France in the Barclays group
- Yann LeCun (1983), Turing Award (known as the Nobel Prize in computer sciences), VP & Director of Artificial Intelligence Facebook
- Jean Michel Karam(1990), Franco-Lebanese engineer, inventor and entrepreneur, CEO of MEMSCAP and INTUISKIN/IOMA.
- Phillippe Carret (1991), Director, Transtechnology
- Michel Platnic(1994), French visual artist and electrical engineer
- Benjamin Bayart (1996), former president of French Data Network (FDN)
- Benoît Joly (1996), SVP Marketing and Smart Home at Technicolor
- Régis Lacote (1997), CEO of Paris Orly Airport
- Frédéric Lepied (1998), French computer scientist and CEO of Mandriva
- Alexis Bédeneau (2004), CIO Deputy at PWC France
- Camelia El Kord (2010), French fencer
- Sreyash Sarkar (2018), Indian poet and researcher
