= École supérieure des affaires =

École Supérieure des Affaires may refer to:

- École supérieure des affaires (Beirut)
- École Supérieure des Affaires (Lille)
