= Breguet =

Breguet may refer to:

- Breguet (watch), watch manufacturer
  - Abraham-Louis Breguet (1747–1823), Swiss watchmaker
  - Louis-François-Clement Breguet (1804–1883), French physicist, watchmaker, electrical and telegraph work
- Breguet Aviation, a defunct French aircraft manufacturer
  - Louis Charles Breguet (1880–1955), French airplane designer
- Breguet School, now known as École supérieure d'ingénieurs en électronique et électrotechnique (ESIEE)
