= École supérieure des affaires (Beirut) =

Business school in Beirut, Lebanon

École Supérieure des Affaires, ESA Business School
- المعهد العالي للأعمال
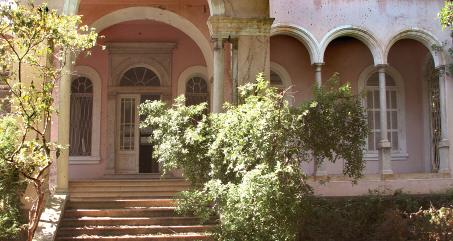
- The Portalis mansion campus building, before its restoration
- Type: Private business school
- Established: 5 April 1996
- Affiliations: ESCP Business School
- President: Maxence Duault
- Academic staff: approx. 250 (visiting)
- Location: 289, rue Clemenceau, Beirut, Lebanon; 33°53′55″N 35°29′21″E
- Campus: Urban 35,000 square metres (8.6 acres)
- Website: www.esa.edu.lb

École supérieure des affaires (ESA Business School) is a business school located in the district of Clemenceau, Beirut, for executives and managers from Lebanon and the Middle East. It holds accreditation from the Association of MBAs, and has obtained the Business Graduate Association (BGA) label. The school enrolls nearly 550 students annually, as along with 510 students in Executive Education programs.

ESA Business School is managed by the Chamber of Commerce and Industry of Paris Ile-de-France Region and is a member of 24 schools.

== History ==
The initiative to establish a business school in Beirut was driven by professor Fayek Abillama, the president of HEC Alumni Association chapter in Lebanon in collaboration with the Paris Chamber of Commerce and Industry.

At early 1995, Jean-Pierre Lafon, former Ambassador of France to Lebanon, advocated for stronger French-Lebanese cooperation in the field of education and training. In May 1995, he approached the Paris Chamber of Commerce and Industry to implement the project with the Bank of Lebanon. A partnership was then set up between the French Ministry of Foreign Affairs, the Bank of Lebanon and the Chamber of Commerce and Industry of Paris.

ESA Business School was officially inaugurated on 5 April 1996, in the presence of the President, Jacques Chirac, Lebanese Prime Minister Rafic Hariri. This was marked by an intergovernmental agreement between France and Lebanon and an agreement between the Bank of Lebanon and the Paris Chamber of Commerce and Industry.

== Campus ==
Under the Ottoman Empire, from 1860, German missions transformed the Levant region into an orphanage and a hospital, built and occupied by the deaconesses of Kaiserswerth on the order of St. John (Johanniterorden) of Jerusalem.

The house of the deaconesses of Beirut, located on what will later be called the “Clemenceau site”, was inaugurated on 10 March 1862. Saint John Hospital received between 9,000 and 12,000 patients per year, then approximately 14,000 patients in 1893, an average of 50 patients per day. When the Chancellery was set up, the assassination of the French ambassador to Lebanon, Louis Delamare, in 1981 pushed the leaders to move the Embassy. The site was later abandoned.

In 1995, when the idea of creating ESA Business School was started, demining operations were carried out by the military; rehabilitation work was launched by Jacques Chirac and Rafic Hariri, who inaugurated the opening of the site on 5 April 1996.

== Academics ==
=== Faculty ===
The Ecole Supérieure des Affaires hosts approximately 250 visiting international academics and professors from the two centers of Business Higher Education of the Paris Chamber of Commerce and Industry: ESCP Business School and HEC group. The ESA is headed by Maxence Duault, who previously served as the deputy director general of ESCP Business School. M. Duault replaced Stéphane Attali in 2019. According to the WBS 2010 ranking, the ESA was ranked first in the MENA region.

=== Academic cooperation ===
- ESCP Europe (École supérieure de commerce de Paris–École européenne des affaires)
- Institut d'Administration des Entreprises at Poitiers
- École supérieure de commerce de Rouen
- HEC Lausanne
- Groupe HEC paris
- Paris Diderot University
- Reims Management School
- Università Commerciale Luigi Bocconi
- Universita Ca' Foscari Venezia
- Skema Business School
- Rotterdam School of Management

== Accolades ==
- ESA’s EMBA, in joint degree with ESCP Business School, is ranked No. 6 worldwide by the Financial Times
- ESA’s BBA, offered as a joint degree with ESSEC BS, is:
  - ranked No. 1 in France in the 2022 ranking of Bachelors in four years by the Challenges
  - ranked No. 1 of the best post-baccalaureate BBAs in business schools in the 2022 L'Etudiant Ranking
