= IOMA =

Skincare brand

- Industry: Skin care
- Founded: 2008
- Headquarters: Paris, France
- Key people: Jean Michel Karam (CEO and creative director)
- Website: ioma-paris.com

IOMA is an evidence-based skincare brand from France. It was founded in 2008 and it is now present in around 300 stores in France and in several other countries including the United States.
