= Continental Square =

Office complex in Tremblay-en-France, France

Coordinates: 49.0089°N 2.5590°E

Continental Square

Continental Square is a 60,000-square-foot (5,600 m^{2}) office complex located in Roissypôle on the grounds of Paris-Charles de Gaulle Airport, in Tremblay-en-France, France, developed by Seifert Architects. The complex has a surface area of 50,000 square metres (540,000 sq ft) and consists of eight buildings. The buildings have underground walkways that link to restaurants and other facilities under pyramid roofs.

== History ==
GA was the builder and owner of Continental Square. Seifert Architects was the architect of the approximately 25,000-square-metre (270,000 sq ft) complex, which was built with off-site manufactured elements.

In 1994, around half of the 24,000 square metres (260,000 sq ft) in the complex was occupied. In 1995, the space was 70% leased, and the owner reduced rent rates. In 1997, the center, then owned by GCI, was 80% occupied.

In 2009, Aéroports de Paris, the operator of CDG Airport, and GE Capital Real Estate France via the subsidiary Foncière Ariane SAS signed an agreement to form a partnership managing the complex. SAS Roissy Continental Square is the name of the partnership. The partnership was finalized in December 2009.

== Tenants ==
ProLogis has offices in the Bâtiment Saturne. Air France operates the Vaccinations Center at Paris-Charles de Gaulle Airport in the Bâtiment Uranus. Servair, an Air France subsidiary, has its head office in Continental Square.
