= Paris Charles de Gaulle Airport =

Main airport serving Paris, France

Paris Charles de Gaulle Airport Roissy Airport Aéroport de Paris-Charles-de-Gaulle Aéroport de Roissy

- View of CDG airport
- IATA: CDG; ICAO: LFPG; WMO: 07157

Summary
- Airport type: Public
- Owner: Groupe ADP
- Operator: Paris Aéroport
- Serves: Paris metropolitan area
- Location: Roissy-en-France, France
- Opened: 8 March 1974; 52 years ago
- Hub for: Air France; Air France Cargo; FedEx Express
- Operating base for: Air France Hop; easyJet
- Elevation AMSL: 119 m (390 ft)
- Coordinates: 49°00′35″N 002°32′52″E
- Public transit access: Réseau Express Régional: Aéroport Charles de Gaulle 1 station Aéroport Charles de Gaulle 2 TGV station
- Website: parisaeroport.fr/en/charles-de-gaulle-airport

Maps
- Location in Île-de-France CDG/LFPG (France)
- Interactive map of Paris Charles de Gaulle Airport; Roissy Airport

Runways
Direction	Length		Surface
Direction	m	ft	Surface
08L/26R	4,142	13,589	Asphalt
08R/26L	2,700	8,858	Asphalt
09L/27R	2,700	8,858	Asphalt
09R/27L	4,200	13,780	Asphalt
FATO 08/26	440	1,444	Turf

Statistics (2025)
- Passengers: 72,029,407
- Aircraft movements: 473,798
- Source: AIP France; Passenger Traffic & Aircraft Movements; Freight Movements

Paris Charles de Gaulle Airport (IATA: CDG, ICAO: LFPG), also known as Roissy Airport, is the primary international airport serving Paris, the capital of France. The airport opened in 1974 and is located in Roissy-en-France, 23 km (14 mi) northeast of the city centre of Paris. It is named after World War II leader and French president Charles de Gaulle, whose initials form its IATA airport code. It is one of two airports to serve the greater Paris area, the other being Orly Airport.

Charles de Gaulle Airport serves as the principal hub for Air France, as well as an operating base for easyJet. It is operated by Groupe ADP (Aéroports de Paris) under the brand Paris Aéroport.

In 2024, the airport handled 70,290,260 passengers and 466,543 aircraft movements, making it the world's fourteenth busiest airport and Europe's third busiest airport (after London–Heathrow and Istanbul) in terms of passenger numbers. Charles de Gaulle is the busiest airport within the European Union. In terms of cargo traffic, the airport is the second busiest in Europe, after Frankfurt, handling 1,914,681 tonnes of cargo in 2024. As of 2025, it was the airport served by the second highest number of airlines, after Suvarnabhumi Airport, with 105 airlines operating from it.

Régis Lacote has been the director of the airport since 14 November 2022.

== Location ==
Paris Charles de Gaulle Airport covers 32.38 square kilometres (12.50 sq mi) of land. The airport area, including terminals and runways, spans over three départements and six communes:

- Seine-et-Marne département: Le Mesnil-Amelot (Terminal 2E, Satellites S3 and S4, and Terminal 2F), Mauregard (Terminals 1, 3), and Mitry-Mory (Terminal 2G) communes;
- Seine-Saint-Denis département: Tremblay-en-France (Terminals 2A, 2B, 2C, 2D and Roissypôle) commune;
- Val-d'Oise département: Roissy-en-France and Épiais-lès-Louvres communes.

The choice of constructing an international aviation hub outside of central Paris was made due to a limited prospect of potential relocations or expropriations and the possibility of further expanding the airport in the future.

Management of the airport lies solely on the authority of Groupe ADP, which also manages Orly (south of Paris), Le Bourget (to the immediate southwest of Charles de Gaulle Airport, now used for general aviation and Paris Air Shows), several smaller airfields in the suburbs of Paris, and other airports directly or indirectly worldwide.

== History ==
=== Development ===
The planning and construction phase of what was known then as Aéroport de Paris Nord (Paris North Airport) began in 1966.

Terminal 2 opened in 1981 with the official inauguration in presence of the then President, François Mitterrand, in March 1982. Unlike Terminal 1, Terminal 2 was designed with a traditional linear layout, but has evolved over time into a series of distinct terminals, designated as 2A through to 2G.

The CDG Express, the direct express rail link from Paris to Charles de Gaulle Airport, is scheduled to open in early 2027.

On 15 December 2025, Groupe ADP announced that each terminal will be renamed in March 2027.

=== Corporate identity ===
On 14 April 2016, the Groupe ADP rolled out the Connect 2020 corporate strategy and the commercial brand Paris Aéroport was applied to all Parisian airports, including Le Bourget airport.

== Terminals ==
Airport diagram

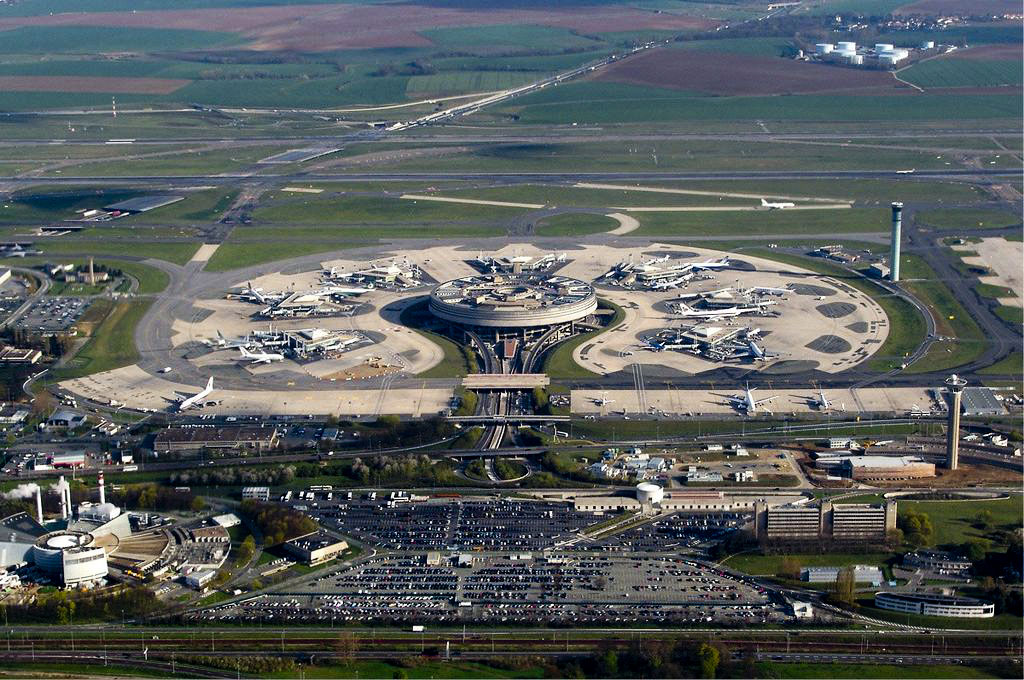
Aerial view of Terminal 1 in 2005 (before refurbishment)

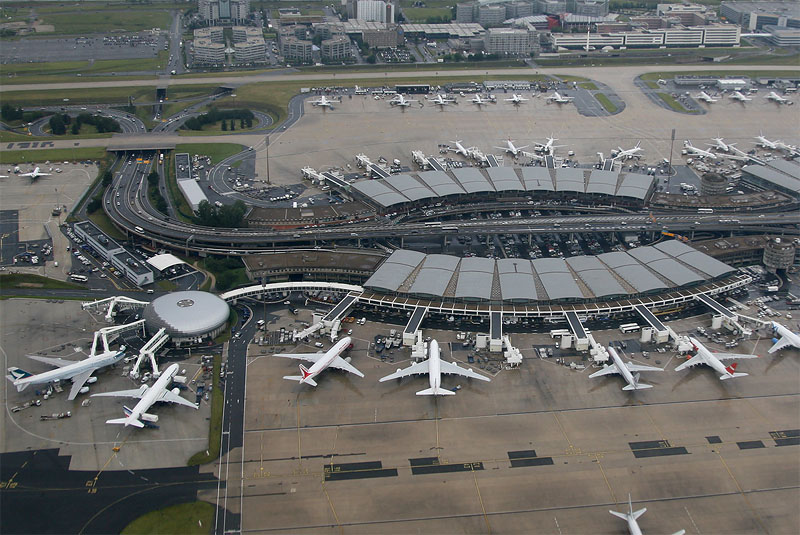
Aerial view of Terminal 2A and 2B in 2007 (before refurbishment)

Charles de Gaulle Airport has three terminals: Terminal 1 is the oldest and situated opposite to Terminal 3; Terminal 2 is located at another side with 7 sub-terminal buildings (2A to 2G). Terminal 2 was originally built exclusively for Air France; since then it has been expanded significantly and now houses other airlines. Terminals 2A to 2F are interconnected by elevated walkways and situated next to each other. Terminal 2G is a satellite building connected by shuttle bus.

=== Terminal 1 ===
Terminal 1 closed in March 2020 in response to the drop in traffic during the COVID-19 pandemic. ADP used this time for a €250 million refurbishment. Completed in 2023, the refurbishment included the creation of a new junction building linking satellites 1, 2 and 3, and modernisation of the central body of the terminal. Various design details in the refurbished terminal pay homage to the circular shape of the original Andreu design. The upgraded Terminal 1 also features a new departure lounge designed by French designers Maxime Liautard and Hugo Toro, which reflects the ambiance of a Parisian bistro.

The terminal is primarily used by Star Alliance airlines with a few exceptions. Other carriers include Oneworld carriers Qatar Airways and SriLankan Airlines; SkyTeam carrier Saudia; and non-alliance carriers including Aer Lingus, Etihad Airways, Eurowings, Icelandair, and Kuwait Airways.

=== Terminal 2 ===
Terminal 2A is used by Oneworld carriers American Airlines, Cathay Pacific, Malaysia Airlines and Qantas; Star Alliance carrier Ethiopian Airlines; SkyTeam carrier XiamenAir; and non-alliance carriers including Air Austral, Air Senegal, Air Côte d'Ivoire and LATAM Airlines.

Terminal 2B is used by Oneworld carrier Royal Air Maroc; Star Alliance carrier ITA Airways; SkyTeam carrier Scandinavian Airlines; and non-alliance airlines including AirBaltic, Air Montenegro, El Al, JetBlue, KM Malta Airlines and Sky Express.

Terminal 2C is used by Oneworld carriers British Airways, Oman Air and Royal Jordanian; Star Alliance carriers Air Canada and Air India; SkyTeam carriers Aeromexico, Kenya Airways, Middle East Airlines and Vietnam Airlines; and non-alliance carriers including Aircalin, Air Seychelles, Emirates, Gulf Air and WestJet.

Terminal 2D is used by Oneworld carrier Finnair; Star Alliance carriers Aegean Airlines, Croatia Airlines and LOT Polish Airlines; and non-alliance carriers including Air Tahiti Nui, Air Serbia, Atlantic Airways, easyJet, Air Algérie, Georgian Airways and Norwegian Air Shuttle.

Terminal 2E is used by Air France and its SkyTeam partners China Eastern Airlines, Delta Air Lines, Korean Air and Middle East Airlines; Oneworld carrier Japan Airlines; and non-alliance carriers including Air Mauritius, China Southern Airlines and Madagascar Airlines.

Terminal 2F is used by Air France and its SkyTeam partners KLM and TAROM.

==== Collapse of Terminal 2E ====
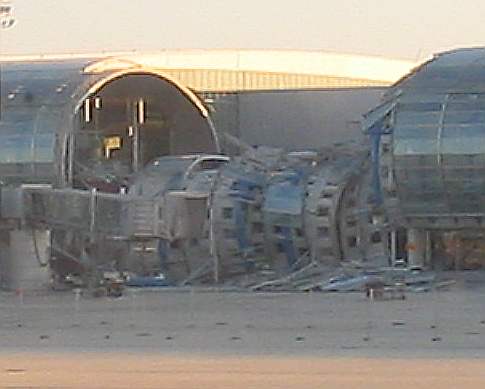
Collapsed Terminal 2E, June 2004

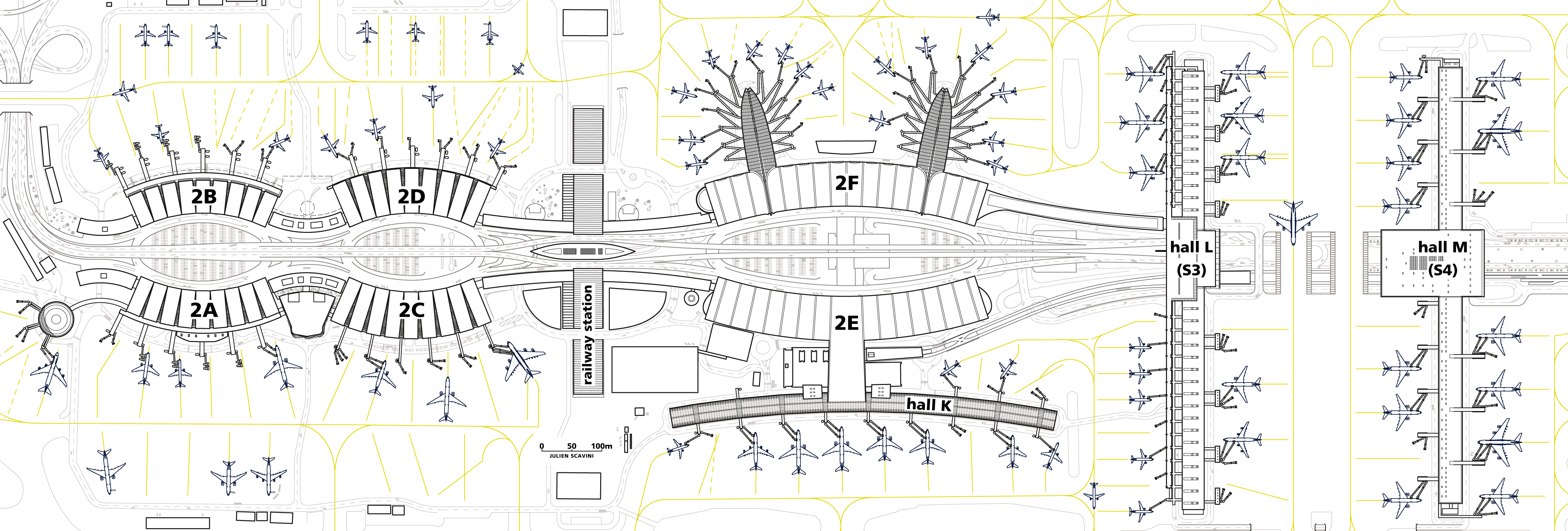
Map of terminal 2 various halls

On 23 May 2004, shortly after the inauguration of terminal 2E, a portion of it collapsed near Gate E50, killing four people. Two of the dead were reported to be Chinese citizens, one Czech and the other Lebanese.

On 17 March 2005, ADP decided to tear down and rebuild the whole part of Terminal 2E (the "jetty") of which a section had collapsed, at a cost of approximately €100 million.

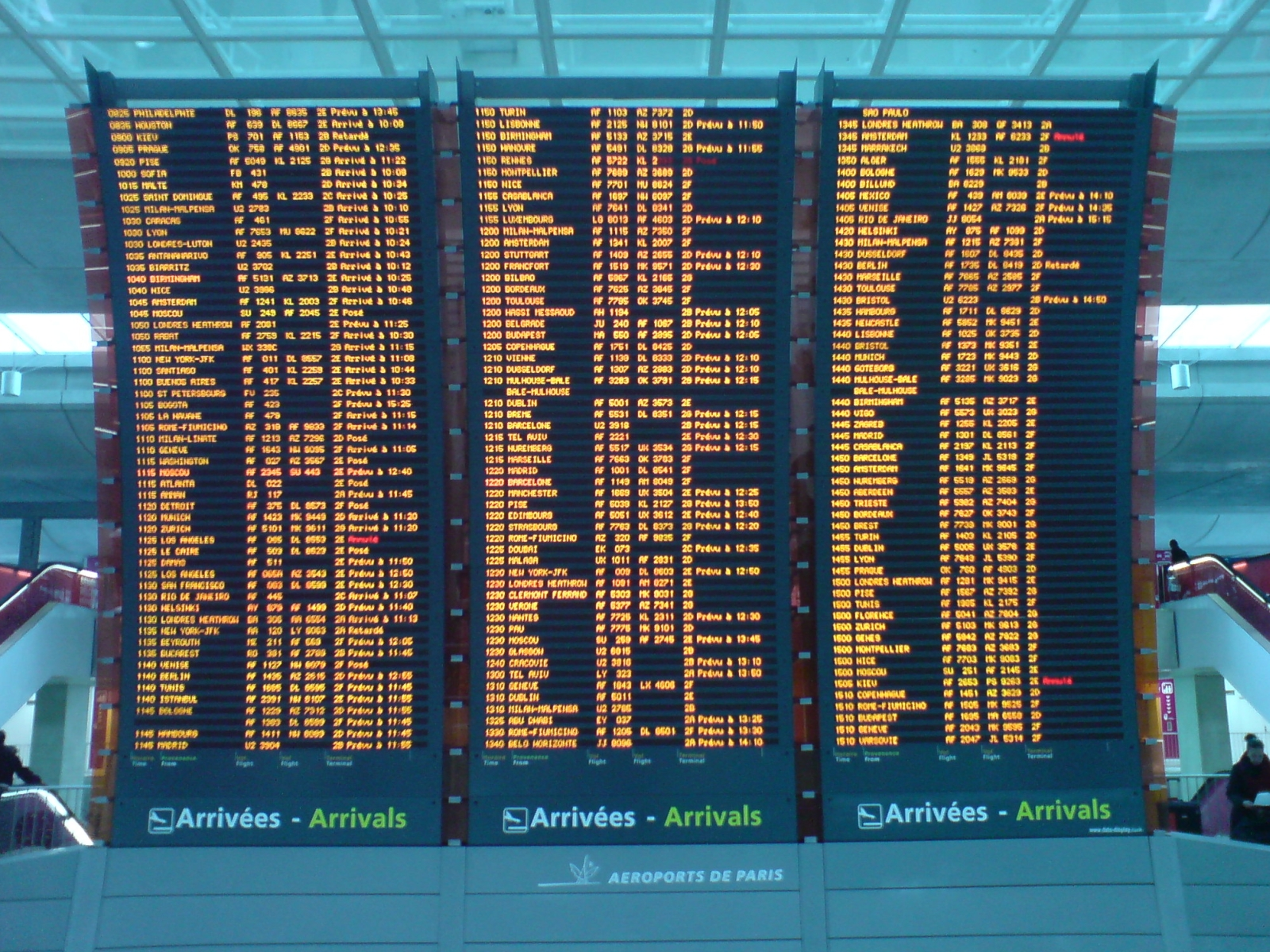
Terminal 2, former display screen

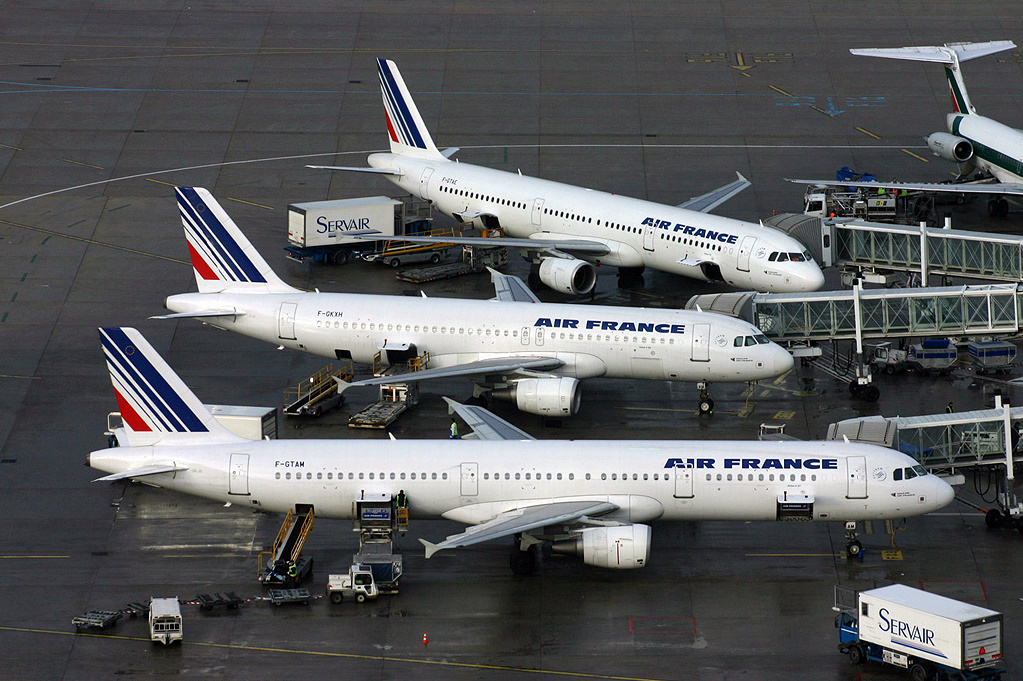
Air France aircraft on stands at Terminal 2F at Charles de Gaulle Airport

==== Recent terminal reassignments ====
Further, in April 2013, Terminal 2B closed for a complete renovation (with all airlines relocating to 2D) and received upgrades including the addition of a second floor completely dedicated to arrivals. Terminal 2B reopened on 2 June 2021. Airlines including the Lufthansa group, Aegean Airlines, easyJet, Icelandair, LOT Polish Airlines, Norwegian Air Shuttle, Play, Royal Air Maroc, and Scandinavian Airlines began operations at Terminal 2B until 2 December 2022, when the airlines except easyJet and Royal Air Maroc moved back to Terminal 1. Low-cost carrier easyJet has shown interest in being the sole carrier at 2B. To facilitate connections, a new boarding area between 2A and 2C was opened in March 2012. It allows for all security and passport control to be handled in a single area, allows for many new shopping opportunities as well as new airline lounges, and eases transfer restrictions between 2A and 2C. Terminal 2D was closed during the pandemic and received the same upgrade including an additional floor. Terminal 2D reopened on 18 April 2023 and some airlines have moved operations to the terminal.

=== Terminal 3 ===
Terminal 3 was voted as the best low-cost airlines terminal in the world by Skytrax in 2024.

=== Terminal usage during COVID-19 pandemic ===
The airport's services during the pandemic were sharply reduced. On 30 March 2020, the airport announced it would temporarily close Terminals 1 and 3, moving all remaining flights to Terminal 2. Terminal 2D was also closed during the pandemic and only Terminals 2A, 2C, 2E, 2F and 2G were opened. At the beginning of the pandemic, airlines were grouped by alliances: Star Alliance airlines operated at Terminal 2A, where Air Canada and Ethiopian Airlines operated prior to the pandemic, Oneworld airlines shifted their operations to Terminal 2C, and SkyTeam airlines operated at Terminals 2E and 2F. Between December 2020 and June 2021, only Terminals 2E and 2F were opened with non-Schengen flights operating at Terminal 2E and Schengen flights operated at Terminal 2F. 2B reopened on 2 June 2021 and some airlines were shifted to that concourse. Terminals 2A, 2C and 2D were then reopened for more space. Between June 2021 and December 2022, Star Alliance airlines operated at Terminals 2A (non-Schengen) and 2B (Schengen), Oneworld airlines operated at Terminals 2C (non-Schengen) and 2D (Schengen) and SkyTeam airlines operated at Terminals 2E (non-Schengen), 2F and 2G (both Schengen). However, Star Alliance airlines flights to Asia except Singapore Airlines, who operated at Terminal 2A were operating at Terminal 2E due to the capacity restrictions at Terminal 2A. Terminal 3 reopened on 3 May 2022 for the use of all charter and low cost airlines. Terminal 1 remained closed for renovation at that time. It reopened on 1 December 2022 to reduce traffic at Terminal 2.

=== Cancelled project for Terminal 4 ===
Plans for a new terminal, Terminal 4, were first announced in 2014. With an estimated cost of €9bn, the new terminal was to be built around 2025, when Charles de Gaulle Airport's maximum capacity of 80 million would have been reached. When constructed, the new terminal would have been able to accommodate 30–40 million passengers per year and would have likely been built north of Terminal 2E. However, the Terminal 4 proposal was cancelled in 2021 due to reduced traffic resulting from the COVID-19 pandemic and new environmental regulations making the project unfeasible. Environmentalist groups hailed the cancellation of the project as a "great victory."

=== Change of Terminal numbering from 16 March 2027 ===
The airport authorities will renumber the terminals from the 16 March 2027. The renumbering will group some terminals together while removing the current situation whereby Terminal 2 has 7 subterminals (2A to 2G) while the other two terminals, 1 and 3, don't have any. From this date:

- Terminal 1 will remain named Terminal 1
- Terminal 3 will become Terminal 2
- Terminals 2A and 2C will be grouped together as Terminal 3
- Terminals 2B and 2D will be grouped together as Terminal 4
- Terminal 2E will become Terminal 5
- Terminal 2F will become Terminal 6
- Terminal 2G will become Terminal 7

Tickets and boarding passes issued for flights after this date may already use the new names.

== Roissypôle ==
Roissypôle is a complex consisting of office buildings, shopping areas, hotels, and a bus coach and RER B station within Charles de Gaulle Airport. The complex includes the head office of Air France, Continental Square, the Hilton Paris Charles de Gaulle Airport, and le Dôme building. Le Dôme includes the head office of Air France Consulting, an Air France subsidiary. Continental Square has the head office of Air France subsidiary Servair and the Air France Vaccinations Centre.

== Airlines and destinations ==
=== Passenger ===
Airlines	Destinations
Aegean Airlines	Athens; Seasonal: Heraklion, Thessaloniki
Aer Lingus	Dublin, Shannon
Aeroméxico	Guadalajara (begins 13 April 2027), Mexico City–Benito Juárez, Monterrey
Air Algérie	Algiers, Annaba, Béjaïa, Biskra, Chlef, Constantine, Oran
Air Arabia	Fès Oujda, Rabat, Tangier
Air Austral	Saint-Denis de la Réunion; Seasonal: Dzaoudzi
Air Cairo	Seasonal: Luxor
Air Canada	Montréal–Trudeau, Toronto–Pearson
Air China	Beijing–Capital, Chengdu–Tianfu
Air Congo	Kinshasa–N'djili
Air Côte d'Ivoire	Abidjan
Air France	Abidjan, Abuja, Algiers, Amsterdam, Antananarivo, Athens, Atlanta, Bangkok–Suvarnabhumi, Barcelona, Basel/Mulhouse, Beijing–Capital, Beirut, Bengaluru, Bergen, Berlin, Biarritz, Bilbao, Billund, Birmingham, Bogotá, Bologna, Bordeaux, Boston, Brazzaville, Brest, Bucharest–Otopeni, Budapest, Buenos Aires–Ezeiza, Cairo, Calvi, Cancún, Casablanca, Cayenne, Chicago–O'Hare, Clermont-Ferrand, Conakry, Copenhagen, Cork, Cotonou, Dakar–Diass, Dallas/Fort Worth, Delhi–Indira Gandhi, Detroit, Djibouti, Douala, Dubai–International, Dublin, Düsseldorf, Edinburgh, Florence, Fort-de-France, Fortaleza, Frankfurt, Geneva, Gothenburg, Hamburg, Hannover, Helsinki, Ho Chi Minh City, Hong Kong, Houston–Intercontinental, Istanbul, Johannesburg–O. R. Tambo, Kilimanjaro, Kinshasa–N'djili, Kraków, Lagos, Libreville, Lima, Lisbon, Ljubljana, Lomé, London–Gatwick, London–Heathrow, Los Angeles, Luanda, Lyon, Madrid, Malabo, Málaga, Manchester, Marrakesh, Marseille, Mauritius, Mexico City–Benito Juárez, Miami, Milan–Linate, Milan–Malpensa, Montpellier, Montréal–Trudeau, Mumbai–Shivaji, Munich, Nairobi–Jomo Kenyatta, Nantes, Naples, Nashville (begins 14 May 2027), N'Djamena, Newcastle upon Tyne, New York–JFK, Newark, Nice, Nouakchott, Nuremberg, Oran, Orlando, Osaka–Kansai, Oslo, Ottawa, Panama City–Tocumen, Papeete, Pau, Phoenix–Sky Harbor, Pointe-à-Pitre, Pointe-Noire, Porto, Prague, Rabat, Raleigh/Durham, Rennes, Rio de Janeiro–Galeão, Riyadh, Rome–Fiumicino, Saint-Denis de la Réunion, Salvador da Bahia, San Diego (begins 3 May 2027), San Francisco, San José (CR), Santiago de Chile, São Paulo–Guarulhos, Seattle/Tacoma, Seoul–Incheon, Seville, Shanghai–Pudong, Singapore, Sint Maarten, Stockholm–Arlanda, Tbilisi, Tel Aviv, Tenerife–South, Tokyo–Haneda, Toronto–Pearson, Toulouse, Tromsø, Tunis, Turin, Valencia, Vancouver, Venice, Vienna, Warsaw–Chopin, Washington–Dulles, Yaoundé, Yerevan, Zagreb, Zurich; Seasonal: Bari, Cagliari, Cape Town, Catania, Corfu, Djerba, Dubrovnik, Faro, Figari, Heraklion, Ibiza, Kalamata, Kiruna, Kittilä, Las Vegas, Malé, Malta, Manila, Minneapolis/St. Paul, Mykonos, Olbia, Palermo, Palma de Mallorca, Phuket, Punta Cana, Québec City, Rhodes, Rovaniemi, Santorini, Split, Tirana, Verona, Zanzibar
Air India	Delhi–Indira Gandhi
Air Mauritius	Mauritius
Air Montenegro	Podgorica
Air Nostrum	Seasonal charter: Palma de Mallorca
Air Saint-Pierre	Seasonal: Saint-Pierre
Air Senegal	Dakar–Diass
Air Serbia	Belgrade
Air Tahiti Nui	Los Angeles, Papeete
Air Transat	Montréal–Trudeau, Québec City,Toronto–Pearson
airBaltic	Riga, Tallinn, Vilnius
Aircalin	Bangkok–Suvarnabhumi, Nouméa
AJet	Ankara, Istanbul–Sabiha Gökçen
Alaska Airlines	Seasonal: Seattle/Tacoma (begins 26 May 2027)
All Nippon Airways	Tokyo–Haneda
American Airlines	Dallas/Fort Worth, New York–JFK, Philadelphia; Seasonal: Charlotte, Chicago–O'Hare
Animawings	Bucharest–Otopeni
arkia	Tel Aviv
Asiana Airlines	Seoul–Incheon
ASL Airlines France	Algiers, Tel Aviv; Seasonal: Annaba, Bejaia, Corfu, Oujda, Pristina
Atlantic Airways	Seasonal: Vágar
Aurigny	Guernsey
Austrian Airlines	Vienna
Avianca	Bogotá
Azerbaijan Airlines	Baku
Azores Airlines	Ponta Delgada
British Airways	London–Heathrow
Brussels Airlines	Brussels
Bulgaria Air	Sofia; Seasonal: Varna
Cabo Verde Airlines	Praia, Sal, São Vicente
Cathay Pacific	Hong Kong
China Eastern Airlines	Nanjing, Shanghai–Pudong
China Southern Airlines	Guangzhou
Condor	Frankfurt
Croatia Airlines	Zagreb; Seasonal: Dubrovnik, Split
Cyprus Airways	Seasonal: Larnaca
Delta Air Lines	Atlanta, Boston, Cincinnati, Detroit, Los Angeles, Minneapolis/St. Paul, New York–JFK, Salt Lake City, Seattle/Tacoma; Seasonal: Austin (begins 28 March 2027)
easyJet	Agadir, Belfast–International, Belgrade, Berlin, Birmingham, Budapest, Catania, Edinburgh, Fuerteventura, Funchal, Giza, Glasgow, Hurghada, Kraków, Lanzarote, Leeds Bradford, Lisbon, Liverpool, London–Gatwick, London–Luton, London–Southend, London–Stansted, Manchester, Marrakesh, Milan–Linate, Milan–Malpensa, Nice, Oslo, Palermo, Rabat, Reykjavík–Keflavík, Southampton (begins 26 October 2026), Venice; Seasonal: Aberdeen, Ajaccio Bari, Calvi, Corfu, Figari, Gran Canaria, Heraklion, Kittilä, Larnaca, Luxor, Menorca, Palma de Mallorca, Rovaniemi, Sharm El Sheikh, Split, Tenerife–South, Tromsø
Egyptair	Cairo
El Al	Tel Aviv
Emirates	Dubai–International
Ethiopian Airlines	Addis Ababa
Etihad Airways	Abu Dhabi
Eurowings	Hamburg
EVA Air	Taipei–Taoyuan
Finnair	Helsinki
FlyOne	Bucharest–Otopeni; Seasonal: Yerevan
FLYYO	Seasonal charter: Tel Aviv
Georgian Airways	Tbilisi
Gulf Air	Bahrain
Hainan Airlines	Chongqing, Shenzhen, Xi'an
HiSky	Bucharest–Otopeni
Iberia	Madrid
Icelandair	Reykjavík–Keflavík
ITA Airways	Milan–Linate
Japan Airlines	Tokyo–Haneda
Jet2.com	East Midlands (begins 26 March 2027), Leeds Bradford, London–Stansted (begins 25 March 2027), Manchester (begins 25 March 2027)
JetBlue	Boston, New York–JFK
Kenya Airways	Nairobi–Jomo Kenyatta
KLM	Amsterdam
KM Malta Airlines	Malta
Korean Air	Seoul–Incheon
Kuwait Airways	Kuwait City
LATAM Brasil	São Paulo–Guarulhos
Loganair	Seasonal: Jersey
LOT Polish Airlines	Warsaw–Chopin
Lufthansa	Frankfurt, Munich
Lufthansa City Airlines	Munich
Luxair	Luxembourg
Malaysia Airlines	Kuala Lumpur–International
Middle East Airlines	Beirut
Norwegian Air Shuttle	Copenhagen, Oslo, Stockholm–Arlanda; Seasonal: Bergen, Stavanger, Tromsø
Nouvelair	Monastir, Tunis
Oman Air	Muscat
Pakistan International Airlines	Islamabad
Pegasus Airlines	Ankara, Istanbul–Sabiha Gökçen
Qantas	Perth, Singapore, Sydney–Kingsford Smith
Qatar Airways	Doha
Royal Air Maroc	Casablanca, Marrakesh, Tétouan; Seasonal: Oujda, Rabat
Royal Jordanian	Amman–Queen Alia
RwandAir	Kigali
Saudia	Riyadh; Seasonal: Medina
Scandinavian Airlines	Copenhagen, Oslo, Stockholm–Arlanda
Singapore Airlines	Singapore
Sky Express	Athens; Seasonal: Heraklion
Smartwings	Prague
SriLankan Airlines	Colombo–Bandaranaike
SunExpress	Ankara, Antalya, Izmir
Swiss International Air Lines	Zurich
TAROM	Bucharest–Otopeni
Thai Airways International	Bangkok–Suvarnabhumi
Trinity Airways	Seoul–Incheon
TUI fly Belgium	Brussels
Turkish Airlines	Istanbul
Tus Airways	Seasonal: Larnaca
United Airlines	Chicago–O'Hare, Denver (begins 28 May 2027), Newark, San Francisco, Washington–Dulles
Uzbekistan Airways	Tashkent, Urgench
Vietnam Airlines	Hanoi, Ho Chi Minh City
Vueling	Barcelona, Gran Canaria, Seville
WestJet	Calgary; Seasonal: Halifax, St. John's (NL)
World2Fly	Seasonal: Madrid
XiamenAir	Xiamen

=== Cargo ===
Airlines	Destinations
Air France Cargo	Bengaluru, Chicago–O'Hare, Dublin, Glasgow–Prestwick, Guadalajara, Hong Kong, Houston–Intercontinental, Tokyo–Narita
ASL Airlines France	Ajaccio, Hannover, Gdańsk, Istanbul, Katowice, Leipzig/Halle, Marseille, Toulouse
Cathay Cargo	Hong Kong
China Cargo Airlines	Shanghai–Pudong
CMA CGM Air Cargo	Abu Dhabi, Baku, Guangzhou, Hong Kong, Mumbai, Shanghai-Pudong
Emirates SkyCargo	Dubai–Al Maktoum
Etihad Cargo	Abu Dhabi
FedEx Express	Beijing–Capital, East Midlands, Frankfurt, Indianapolis, Istanbul, London–Stansted, Memphis, Newark, Osaka–Kansai, Riyadh
Korean Air Cargo	Seoul–Incheon
MNG Airlines	Cologne/Bonn, Istanbul
Singapore Airlines Cargo	Singapore
Turkish Cargo	Istanbul
UPS Airlines	Cologne/Bonn, Hong Kong, Louisville, Philadelphia

== Ground transportation ==
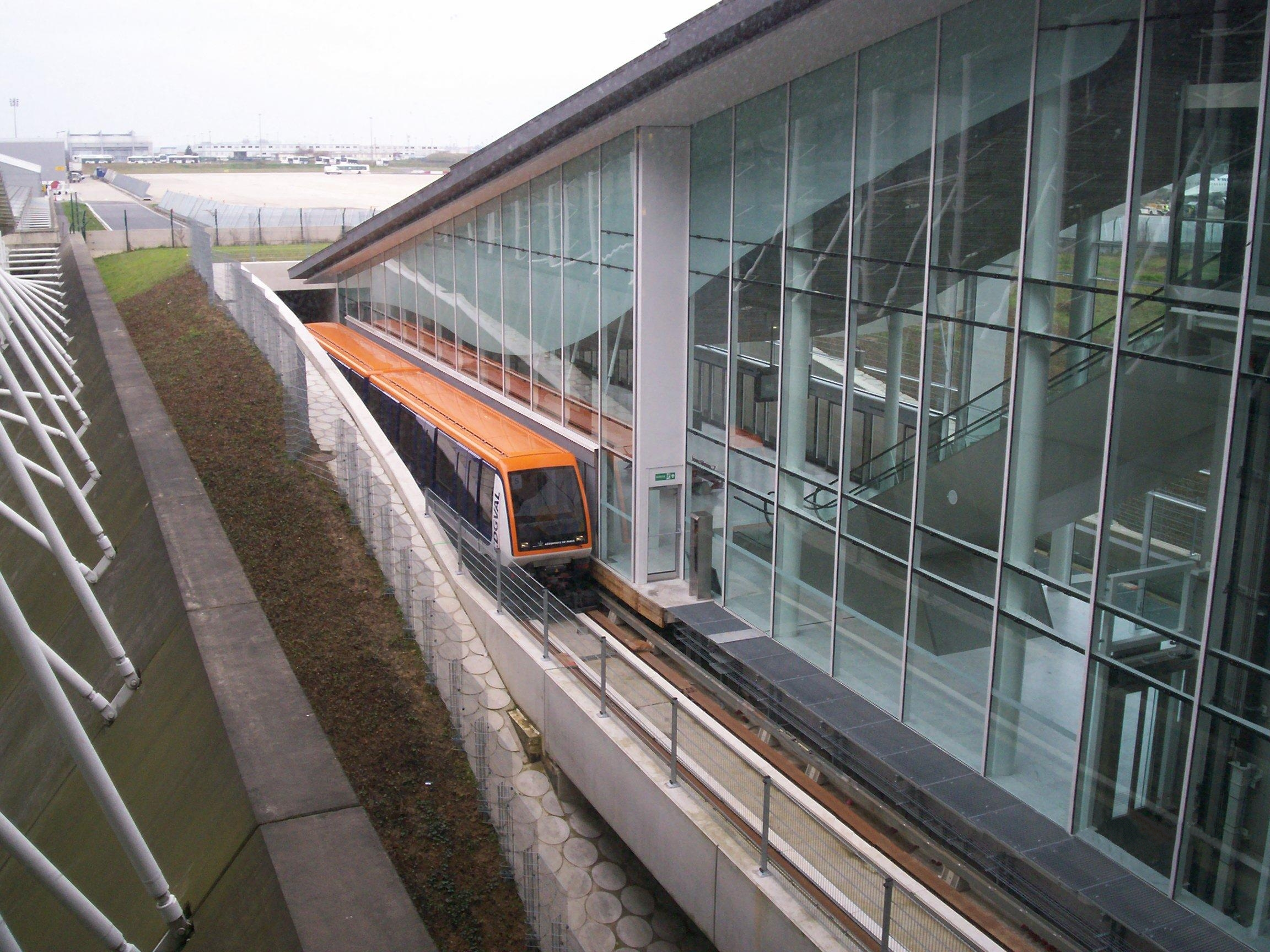
Terminal 2, CDGVAL station

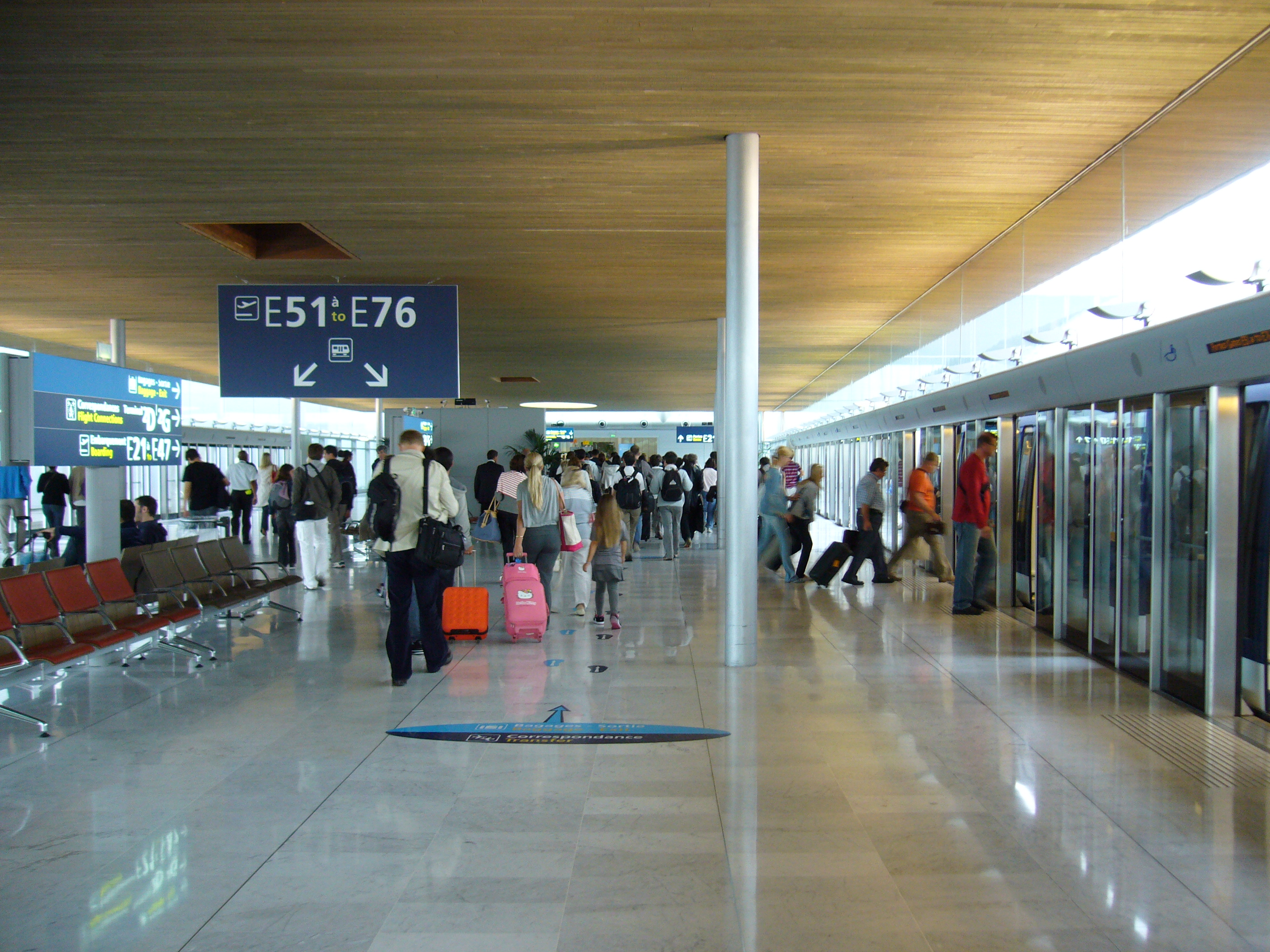
Terminal 2E, LISA station

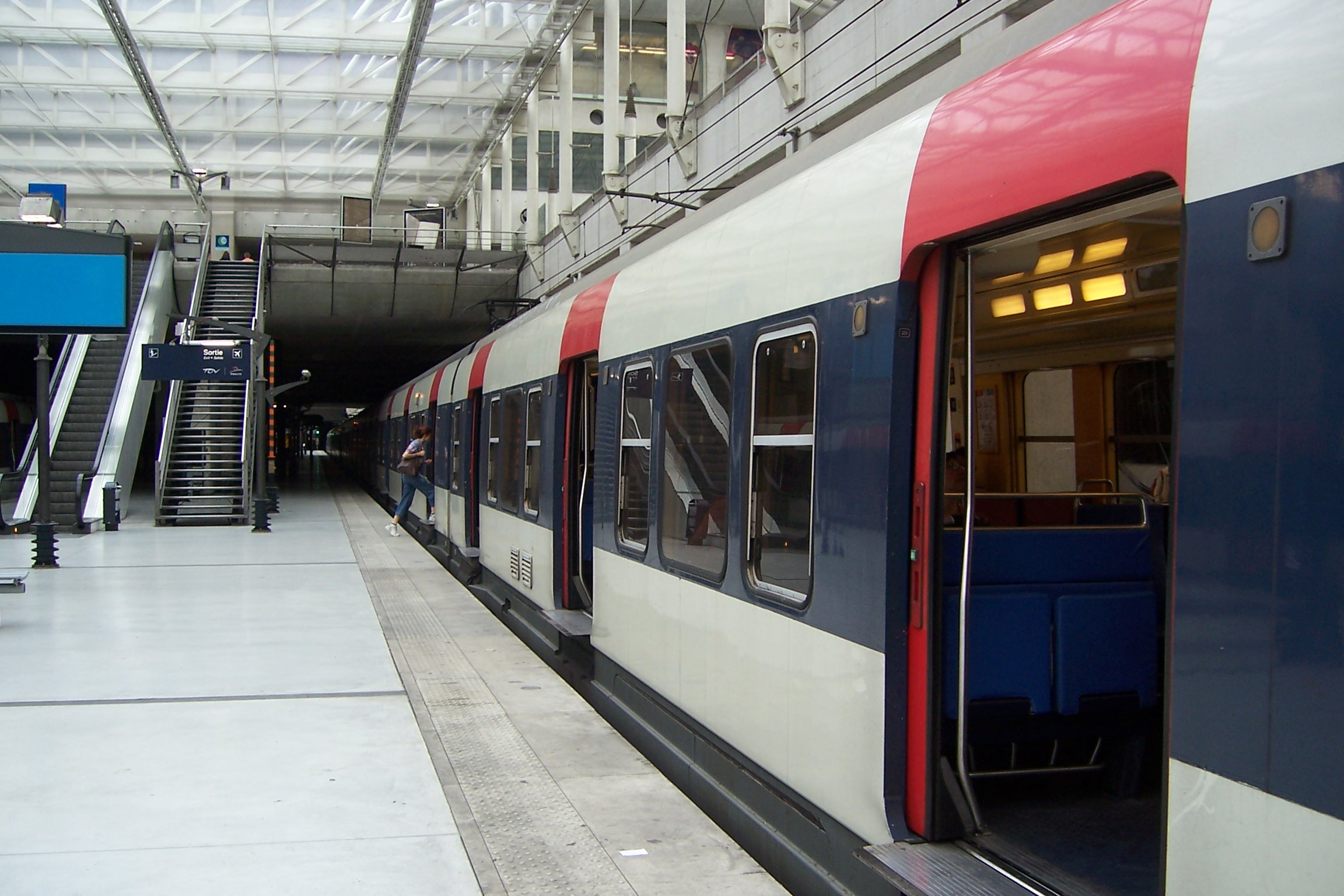
RER station of Aéroport Charles de Gaulle 2 TGV

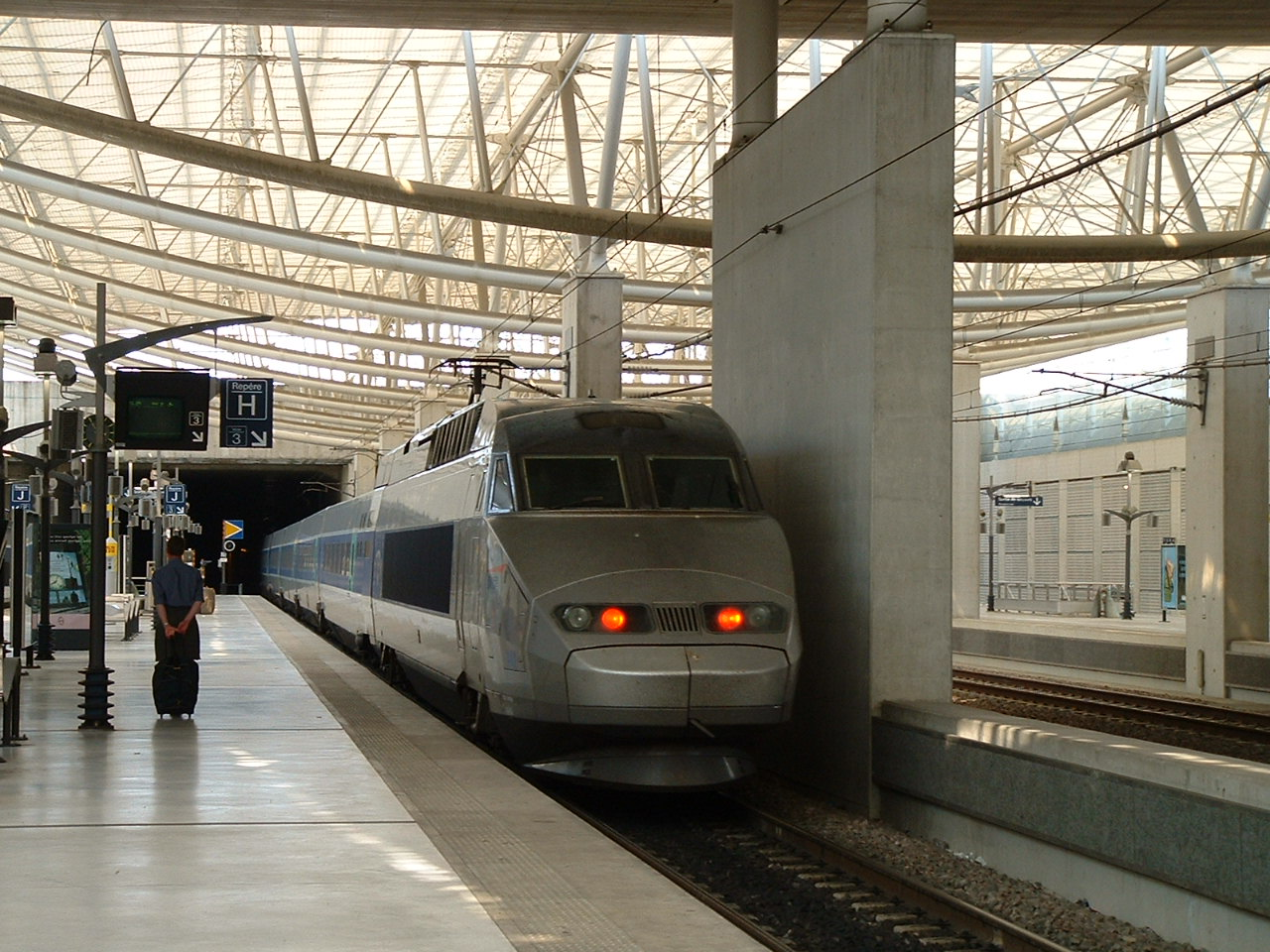
Train station of Aéroport Charles de Gaulle 2 TGV

=== CDGVAL ===
The airport's terminals are served by a free automated shuttle rail system, consisting of two lines (CDGVAL and LISA).

CDGVAL (Charles de Gaulle Véhicule Automatique Léger, English: Charles de Gaulle light automatic vehicle) links Terminal 1, parking lot PR, Aéroport Charles de Gaulle 1 RER station (located inside Roissypôle and next to Terminal 3), Parking lot PX, and the Aéroport Charles de Gaulle 2 TGV and RER station located between Terminals 2C, 2D, 2E, and 2F

LISA (Liaison Interne Satellite Aérogare, English: Connection internal satellite terminal) links Terminal 2E to the Satellite S3 (L Gates) and Satellite S4 (M Gates).

=== RER ===
Charles de Gaulle Airport is connected to central Paris by the RER B, a hybrid suburban commuter and rapid transit line. The service has two stations on the airport grounds:

- Aéroport Charles de Gaulle 1 station, located inside Roissypôle and next to Terminal 3. The station provides the fastest access to Terminal 1 via a connection on CDGVAL.
- Aéroport Charles de Gaulle 2 TGV station, located between Terminals 2C, 2D, 2E, and 2F.

During most times, there are two types of services that operate on the RER B between Charles de Gaulle airport and Paris:

- 4 trains per hour making all stops between Charles de Gaulle airport and Saint-Rémy-lès-Chevreuse
- 4 trains per hour that offer non-stop express service between Charles de Gaulle airport, Aulnay-sous-Bois, and Gare du Nord, and then all stops to Massy–Palaiseau

The RER B has historically suffered from slowness and overcrowding, so French authorities are building CDG Express, a train service that will operate non-stop from Charles de Gaulle Airport to Paris Gare de l'Est railway station (next to Gare du Nord) starting on 28 March 2027. It will share some of the same tracks, and is expected to offer a 20-minute non-stop ride every half hour from 5am to midnight. The new line is expected to take airline customers off RER B, making room for local passengers, and divert to rail 15% of automobile trips to the airport.

=== TGV ===
Terminal 2 includes a TGV station on the LGV Interconnexion Est line. TGV inOui, Ouigo and Eurostar high-speed services operate from the station offering services to stations across France and into Belgium and the Netherlands.

=== Bus ===
The following bus routes serve the airport:

- "Magical Shuttle" offers express service between Disneyland Paris and Charles de Gaulle airport, stopping at Terminal 1 and Terminal 2E/2F.
- "Parc Astérix Shuttle" offers express service between Parc Astérix and Charles de Gaulle airport, stopping at Terminal 3 (Roissypôle).
- Transdev bus 9517 offers express service between Gare d'Argenteuil and Charles de Gaulle airport, stopping at Terminal 3 (Roissypôle).
- Transdev bus 350 offers local service between Porte de la Chapelle in Paris and Charles de Gaulle airport, stopping at all terminals (except 2G) and other areas of the airport.
- Transdev bus 351 offers local service between Nation in Paris and Charles de Gaulle airport, stopping at all terminals (except 2G) and other areas of the airport.
- Noctilien bus N140 offers local service during the overnight hours between Gare de l'Est in Paris and Charles de Gaulle airport, stopping at all terminals (except 2G) and other areas of the airport.
- Noctilien bus N143 offers local service during the overnight hours between Gare de l'Est in Paris and Charles de Gaulle airport, stopping at all terminals (except 2G) and other areas of the airport.

=== Long-distance bus ===
BlaBlaCar Bus and Flixbus all offer services to international and domestic destinations from the bus station outside of the Aéroport Charles de Gaulle 1 RER station.

=== Car ===
Charles de Gaulle Airport is directly connected to Autoroute A1 which connects Paris and Lille.

== Alternative airports ==
The two other airports serving Paris are Orly Airport (south of Paris, the other major airport in Paris) and Paris–Le Bourget Airport (north-northeast of Paris, for general aviation and private jets).

Several low-cost airlines also advertise Beauvais–Tillé Airport and Châlons Vatry Airport, respectively 85 kilometres (53 mi) and 165 kilometres (103 mi) from Paris proper, as serving "Paris" with Paris–Beauvais and Paris–Vatry. Beauvais airport has no railway connections, but there is a shuttle bus to central Paris 15 times daily.

== Reception ==
Charles de Gaulle Airport has the reputation of being one of Europe's worst airports regarding missed connections, delayed flights, passenger experience, and lost luggage.

== Accidents and incidents ==
- On 6 January 1993, Lufthansa Flight 5634 from Bremen to Paris, which was carried out under the Lufthansa CityLine brand using a Contact Air Dash 8–300 (registered D-BEAT), hit the ground 1,800 metres (5,900 ft) short of the runway of Charles de Gaulle Airport, resulting in the death of four out of the 23 passengers on board. The four crew members survived. The accident occurred after the pilot had to abort the final approach to the airport because the runway had been closed: the aircraft immediately ahead, a Korean Air Boeing 747, had lost an engine pod upon landing.
- On 25 May 2000, a freight-carrying Shorts 330-200 (operated as Streamline flight 200), departing to Luton, England, collided on the runway with departing Air Liberté Flight 8807, an MD-83 jet. The first officer of the SH36 was killed when the wing tip of the MD-83 tore through his side of the flight deck. The captain was slightly injured and all others aboard survived.
- On 25 July 2000, a Concorde, Air France Flight 4590 from Charles de Gaulle to John F. Kennedy International Airport in New York, crashed into Les Relais Bleus Hotel in Gonesse, killing all 109 people on the aircraft and four people on the ground. Investigations concluded that a tire burst during take-off roll, after running over a metal strip on the runway that had detached from a McDonnell Douglas DC-10-30 operating as Continental Airlines Flight 55, which departed shortly before, leading to a ruptured fuel tank and resulting in engine failure and other damage. Concorde was conducting a charter flight for a German tour company.
- On 5 November 2000, a Boeing 747-200 operating as Cameroon Airlines Flight 070 from Douala International Airport, veered off the runway on landing, causing the nose gear to be ripped off. The thrust lever for the no. 1 engine was not moved to idle on touchdown, and then was inadvertently moved forward, creating uneven thrust and preventing the automatic braking systems from activating. The 203 occupants were evacuated, and the aircraft was written off.

== Statistics ==
The following table shows total passenger numbers.

Year	Passengers	Change
2024	70,290,260	+4.3%
2023	67,421,316	+17.3%
2022	57,474,033	+119.4%
2021	26,196,575	+17.7%
2020	22,257,469	−70.8%
2019	76,150,007	+5.4%
2018	72,229,723	+4.0%
2017	69,471,442	+5.4%
2016	65,933,145	+0.3%
2015	65,766,986	+3.1%
2014	63,813,756	+2.8%
2013	62,052,917	+0.7%
2012	61,611,934	+1.1%
2011	60,970,551	+4.8%
2010	58,167,062	+0.5%
2009	57,906,866	−4.3%
2008	60,874,681	+1.5%

Busiest domestic routes from Paris Charles de Gaulle Airport (2024)
Rank	Airport	Passengers	Change %
1	Nice–Côte d'Azur	1,108,669	▼5.8
2	Toulouse–Blagnac	787,964	▲1.7
3	Marseille–Provence	740,749	▲0.7
4	Bordeaux–Mérignac	630,162	▼3.0
5	Réunion–Roland Garros	576,483	▼3.3
6	Lyon–Saint-Exupéry	561,623	▲1.8
7	Nantes–Atlantique	436,605	▼7.6
8	Montpellier–Méditerranée	427,282	▼8.8
9	Brest–Bretagne	326,758	▼1.5
10	Guadeloupe–Pointe-à-Pitre	263,735	▼1.8

Busiest European routes from Paris Charles de Gaulle Airport (2024)
Rank	Airport	Passengers	Change %
1	Barcelona	1,286,465	▲15.1
2	London LHR	1,122,742	▲6.6
3	Amsterdam	1,120,710	▲2.5
4	Madrid	1,052,673	▲22.2
5	Istanbul IST	1,011,226	▲6.0
6	Rome FCO	966,175	▲4.0
7	Milan MXP	897,240	▲9.4
8	Copenhagen	835,906	▲0.5
9	Munich	830,929	▲7.3
10	Athens	762,757	▼1.1

Busiest intercontinental routes from Paris Charles de Gaulle Airport (2024)
Rank	Airport	Passengers	Change %
1	New York JFK	1,853,571	▲4.7
2	Montreal	1,362,065	▼4.4
3	Dubai DXB	1,268,474	▲2.8
4	Algiers	1,046,531	▲16.6
5	Atlanta	927,429	▲4.9
6	Los Angeles	912,335	▲9.2
7	Doha	795,948	▲16.8
8	Tokyo-Haneda	653,823	▲38.9
9	Tel Aviv	646,225	▼15.3
10	Toronto	619,504	▲2.6

== See also ==
- CDG Express
- Groupe ADP
- Paris Aéroport
- Transportation in France
- List of airports in France
- List of the busiest airports in France
- Mehran Karimi Nasseri
