= Tripartite Programme =

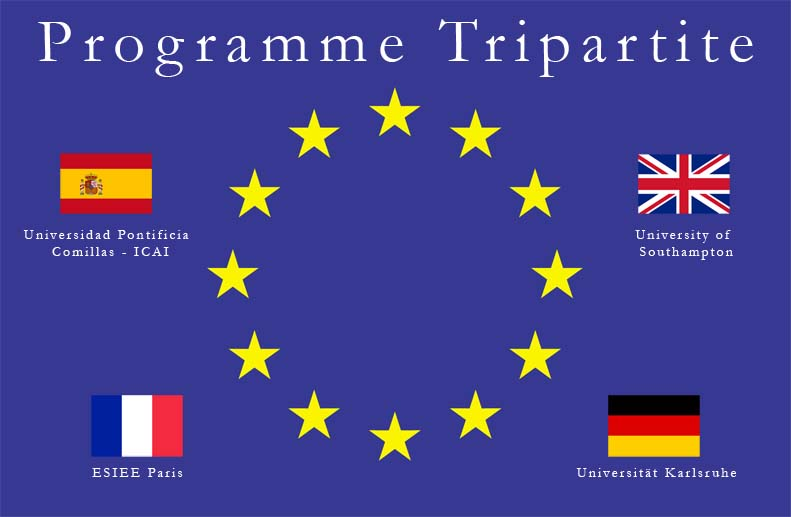

The Tripartite programme was created in 1980. It allows French, German, English and Spanish outstanding students to spend two years of their university studies in two partner universities and thus obtain a tricultural scientific, technical and linguistic profile.

== Programme Description ==
After a high selection based on technical training, language skills and motivation, selected students gain access to the tripartite programme.

Having previously studied for three years in their home universities, students continue their studies for two years in two of the four partner universities. Lectures are conducted in the language of the country and final year students must complete a project lasting a minimum of one semester.

Studies are recognized in each partner universities. This programme is sanctioned by a diploma from the university, and the Tripartite certificate signed by the three host universities for the student.

== Partner universities ==
The tripartite programme includes four European establishments:

- Spain - Pontifical University of Comillas - ICAI - Madrid
- France - ESIEE Paris
- Germany - University of Karlsruhe (TH)
- United Kingdom - University of Southampton
