= Jean Michel Karam =

Franco-Lebanese engineer and inventor (b. 1969)

- Born: 1969 (age 56–57); Lebanon
- Education: Electrical engineering Master's degree in microelectronics
- Alma mater: ESIEE Paris; Université de Paris VII
- Occupations: Engineer and inventor

Jean-Michel Karam (born 1969) is a Lebanese engineer, inventor, and entrepreneur. He has worked with microelectronics, telecommunications, information technology, mobile device repair software, hardware engineering, and cosmetics.

== Education ==
Karam was born in Lebanon, the third of four children. His father was in the army before going into business.

In 1990, he moved to France. He obtained an electrical engineering degree in 1993 from ESIEE Paris and a master's degree in microelectronics from Université de Paris VII. In 1996, he completed a PhD in microelectronics at the INPG.

== Career ==
In 1994, Karam became a research engineer at the TIMA-CM (Techniques de l'Informatique et de la Micro-électronique pour l'Architecture Informatique) laboratory in Grenoble, France. He later became a Research Director and led a team that developed microelectromechanical systems (MEMS).

In November 1997, Karam founded his first company, MEMSCAP, a supplier of products based on MEMS technology.

On 2 March 2001, MEMSCAP became a publicly traded company on Eurolist C of the NYSE Euronext, Paris.

In 2010, Karam spun off INTUISKIN from MEMSCAP, launching the skincare brand IOMA. Véra Strubi, former president of Thierry Mugler, joined the board of directors of MEMSCAP in 2007.

As of 2024, Karam is the Chairman and CEO of both MEMSCAP and INTUISKIN/IOMA. He is also the president of the LEYLA charity, a non-profit association focused on combating orphan and rare diseases.

Karam currently holds over 80 patents and has worked on several scientific and economic publications.

== IEVA ==
In 2016, Karam founded IEVA alongside David Moulinier, who is currently the managing director. IEVA works in combining microelectronics, sensors, and artificial intelligence with personalized cosmetics research.

== Awards ==
Karam and his company have received awards including:

- EU Business News award for ‘Best Personalised Beauty CEO’ in 2023
- U.S. Commercial Service (USCS) of the United States Department of Commerce – Award of Excellence for international commercial development (2012)
- SEMICON MicroNanoSystems Innovation Award (2009)
