= Versailles-Val-d'Oise-Yvelines Chamber of Commerce =

Chamber of Commerce of the Paris region

- Chambre de commerce et d'industrie de Versailles-Val-d'Oise-Yvelines
- Abbreviation: CCIV
- Type: Chamber of Commerce
- Headquarters: 21, avenue de Paris
- Location: Versailles, France
- Region served: Val-d'Oise, Yvelines, Paris region
- Chairman: Yves Fouchet (since 2011)
- Parent organization: Paris - Île-de-France Regional Chamber of Commerce and Industry

The Versailles-Val-d'Oise-Yvelines Chamber of Commerce (Chambre de commerce et d'industrie de Versailles-Val-d'Oise-Yvelines or CCIV) is a Chamber of Commerce of the Paris region, concerning the departments of Val-d'Oise and Yvelines.

It is the second chamber of Commerce in France in term of numbers. It is composed of two delegations : one per department (Versailles, Pontoise). The headquarters of the CCIV are at Versailles 21, avenue de Paris. It is part of the Paris - Ile-de-France Regional Chamber of Commerce and Industry (Chambre régionale de commerce et d'industrie Paris - Île-de-France).

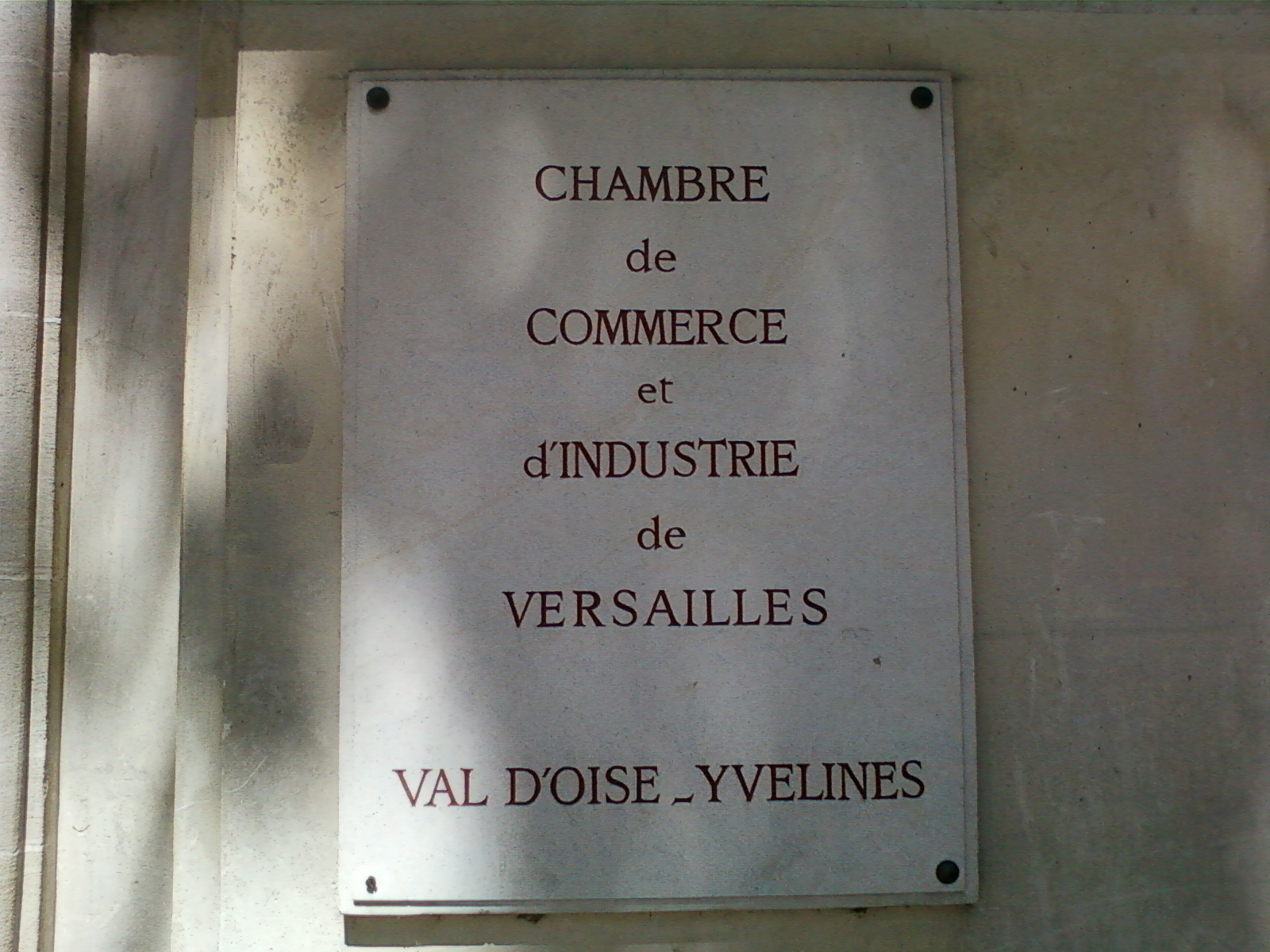

== History ==
The CCIV is chaired since January 6, 2011 by Yves Fouchet, also President of the Regional Chamber of Commerce and Industry (Chambre régionale de commerce et d'industrie or CRCI). From January 2013 it has been part of the Paris Île-de-France Regional Chamber of Commerce and Industry.

== Goals ==
CCIV provides various missions to serve member companies and promote economic development in the Yvelines and Val d'Oise. Like all CCI, it is under the dual supervision of the Ministry of Industry and the Ministry of SMEs, Trade and Handicrafts.
