= Emanuela Potocka =

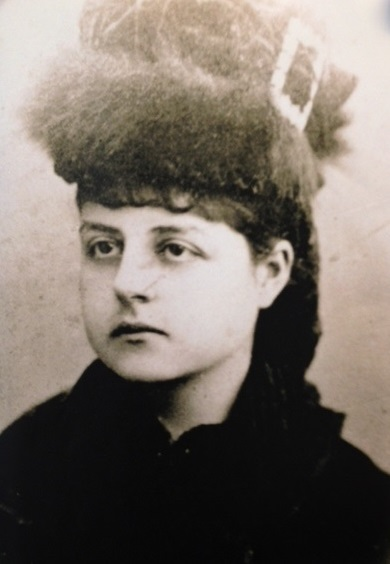
Emmanuela Potocka by Nadar

Countess Emanuela Potocka, born Princess Emanuela Pignatelli di Cerchiara (1852–1930), was an Italian-Polish noblewoman and fashionable salonière in Paris during the 19th century.

She was a descendant of a high noble family from Italy. She married the Polish Count Potocki and established herself at the Hôtel Potocki in the 8th arrondissement of Paris. Her salon became fashionable and was visited and written about by Proust, Maupassant, Barrès, Bourget, Robert de Montesquiou, Reynaldo Hahn, Widor and others. Jean Béraud also painted her salon.

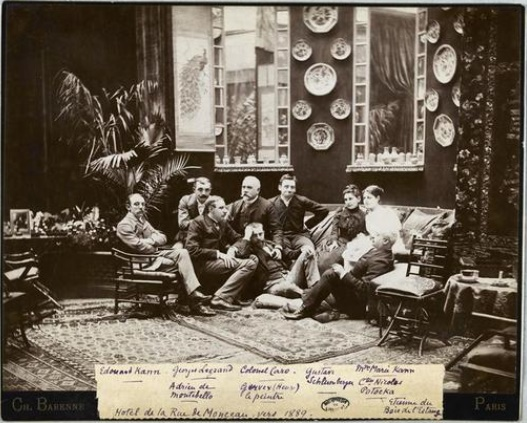
Macchabées 1889
