= Frédéric Lepied =

French computer engineer (born 1967)

- Born: 1967 (age 58–59)
- Occupation: Software engineer
- Employer: Red Hat
- Known for: X Window

Frédéric Lepied (born 1967) is a French computer engineer, and was the CTO of Mandriva until January 2006.

== Biography ==
Born in 1967, Frédéric Lepied took an early interest in computer science and was educated at the Bréguet school in Noisy-le-Grand, France.

In 1999, he joined the Mandrakesoft Research and Development team. He was known as the author of rpmlint, an RPM packages checker (similar to Debian's lintian program), and the maintainer of several core packages, including XFree86 and the initscripts. At that time he wrote an O'Reilly book on CVS (2000) and maintained the wacom tablet driver in XFree86 and in X.Org (2001). He then spent one year in Canada in the Mandrakesoft Montreal office, and became Mandrakesoft CTO when he came back to France in 2002.

Frédéric Lepied left Mandriva on February 3, 2006. He then joined Intel Corporation to manage Software manufacturers relationships. Late 2008, he joined Splitted Desktop Systems, an innovative hardware company, as chief of strategy. In 2013, he became VP Software Engineering at eNovance before joining Red Hat in 2015.
