= Paris Chamber of Commerce =

Chamber of commerce of the Paris region

- Chambre de commerce et d'industrie de Paris
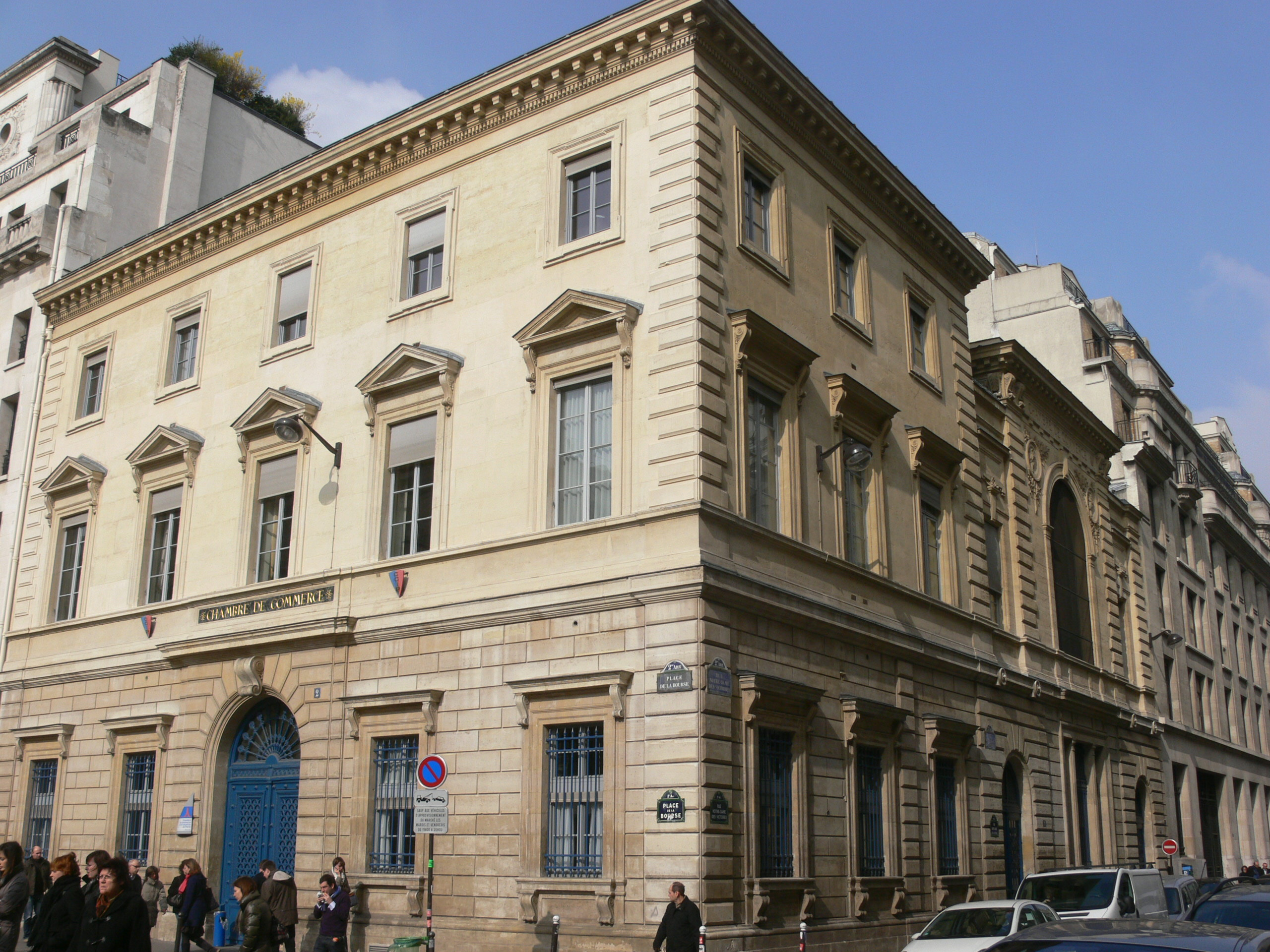
- Chamber of Commerce, Place de la Bourse
- Abbreviation: CCIP
- Formation: 25 February 1803
- Founder: Napoléon I
- Headquarters: 2, place de la Bourse
- Location: Paris, France
- Coordinates: 48.869624°N 2.342144°E
- Official language: French
- Parent organization: Paris Île-de-France Regional Chamber of Commerce and Industry
- Staff: 125 (2015)
- Website: Official website (archived)

The Paris Chamber of Commerce (French: Chambre de commerce et d'industrie de Paris or CCIP) is a chamber of commerce of the Paris region. It defends the interests of companies of the city of Paris, and provides services to these companies. Since 2013 it has been a division of the Paris Île-de-France Regional Chamber of Commerce and Industry.

== History ==
The CCIP was created on 25 February 1803 by Napoleon and is the successor to the Guilds of the Ancien Régime. It was initially located in the préfecture, before transferring to the building now occupied by the Paris Bourse, and then to the Hôtel Potocki.

On 1 January 2013 the Paris Île-de-France Regional Chamber of Commerce and Industry was created, combining eight chambers of commerce of the area in and around Paris. The merger brought together the six departmental CCI (Paris, Hauts-de-Seine, Seine-Saint-Denis, Val-de-Marne, Val d'Oise, Yvelines Versailles) and the two territorial CCI (Seine-et -Marne and Essonne).

On 1 January 2013 the CCI départementale de Paris was created as a division of the CCI de région Paris Ile-de-France. It has its headquarters at 2 Place de la Bourse and provides operational services at the Bourse de commerce. As of 2015 there were 36 elected officials and a staff of 125 people. The CCI Paris acts as an advocate for business in Paris, and provides support to company creators, marketers and business leaders.

== Universities managed by the CCIP ==
The Paris Chamber of Commerce owns many of the city's leading Grandes écoles. The Chamber's full list includes many of France's most famous graduate business schools and engineering schools.

Some of the better known schools include:

- École Supérieure d'Ingénieurs en Électronique et Électrotechnique
- ESCP Business School
- HEC Paris
- ISTM Institut Supérieur de Technologie et de Management

== See also ==
- Paris Île-de-France Regional Chamber of Commerce and Industry

== Sources ==
- "Les missions de la CCI Paris". CCI Paris Ile-de-France.
- Flamand, Philippe (9 January 2013). "La CCI Paris Île-de-France enfin créée" (in French). L'Express.
