= ESIEE Management =

Business school in Paris, France

- Type: Business School (Grande École)
- Established: 1995
- President: Dominique Perrin
- Students: 250
- Postgraduates: French equivalent of a Master's Degree
- Location: Paris, France
- Website: http://www.esiee-management.fr/

ESIEE Management (previously named ISTM or Institut Supérieur de Technologie et de Management) is a French business school created in 1995. ESIEE Management is operated by the Paris Chamber of Commerce. It is located in the east of Paris in Marne-la-Vallée. The school is part of the ESIEE network of graduate schools.

== Institution ==
=== ESIEE Management ===
ESIEE Management is a business school for high tech projects where management and technologies are inseparable. Courses are based on learning management concepts and the knowledge of a technical subject. The academic disciplines and the 10 months of internship allow graduate students to be quickly effective in companies. The possibility to spend the third year in a foreign country gives the opportunity to students to pursue an international career.

The academic specializations are:

- Management and Biotechnology or Bioindustry:

This specialisation gives the opportunity to students to acquire knowledge in life sciences.

- Management and Computer Science or Digital Communications:

This specialization was created to respond to the need for versatility in the fields of data processing, telecommunications and finance.

- Management and Advanced Materials or Integrated Engineering:

This specialization takes place in the automobile and aeronautics field and associated services to accompany the major changes to these industries.

=== Admissions ===
ESIEE Management is one of the French Grandes écoles, and as such it requires passing a selective entrance examination. Students are admitted to ESIEE Management with a scientific or technical degree. Admission in the first year is also possible after two years of university.

=== Accreditations ===
- International accreditations

The ESIEE Management is accredited by the Conférence des Grandes Ecoles and by the Chapitre des écoles de management. It confers a master's degree.

== International partnerships ==
The ESIEE Management has signed partnership agreements with foreign schools and universities. The school is a member of the Erasmus Programme, the European Union's Socrates Programme and it is a partner of the CREPUQ, the official body in charge of student exchanges concerning universities in Quebec and Canada.

Some of the partners of the school are:

- (Canada) - Université du Québec à Montréal
- (Canada) - Université Laval
- (Denmark) - Engineering College of Copenhagen
- (Finland) - Turku School of Economics and Business Administration
- (Italy) - Politecnico di Milano
- (Mexico) - Universidad Nacional Autónoma de México
- (Netherlands) - Inholland University of Applied Sciences in Alkmaar
- (England) - University of Exeter
- (England) - University of Liverpool

== Research ==
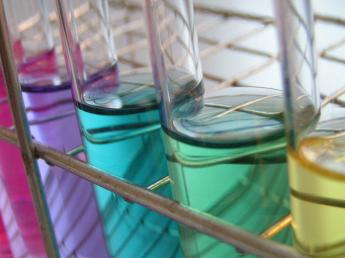

Research is a priority to the management school. First, it contributes to the increase of knowledge and then, in management as in the other scientific disciplines, competitive research is a key factor to economic development, which supports innovation.

ESIEE Management has a search Committee, made up of teacher-researchers. This committee is in charge of orientating the research and evaluates the work in adequacy with the research goals of the ISTM.

The research programs offer the students academic and practical lessons based on academic research and observation of companies.

== Student life ==
=== Campus ===
Created in 1983, the Campus Descartes city is the largest center for higher education and research of the East of Paris. It is composed of 18 high education establishments such as the École des Ponts ParisTech, Engineers 2000, the university of Marne-the-Valley and of course its school of technology, ESIEE Paris.

More than 15,000 students work in this area and the campus is located at 20mn from the heart of Paris by RER.

=== Sport ===
The students have quality facilities including a gymnasium covering 2000 m², a weight training room and a climbing wall. More than 20 sport activities are offered, among them, martial arts, handball, tennis, rugby and volleyball.

=== Clubs ===
- BDE : Students' Union in charge of the organization of social activities and sports events.
- Energie ISTM : Junior Enterprise managed by students who offer consulting services to companies, related to their field of studies.
- 4L Trophy : Humanitarian association.

== See also ==
- Education in France
- Grandes Écoles
