= Hôtel Potocki =

Coordinates: 48.8741°N 2.3014°E

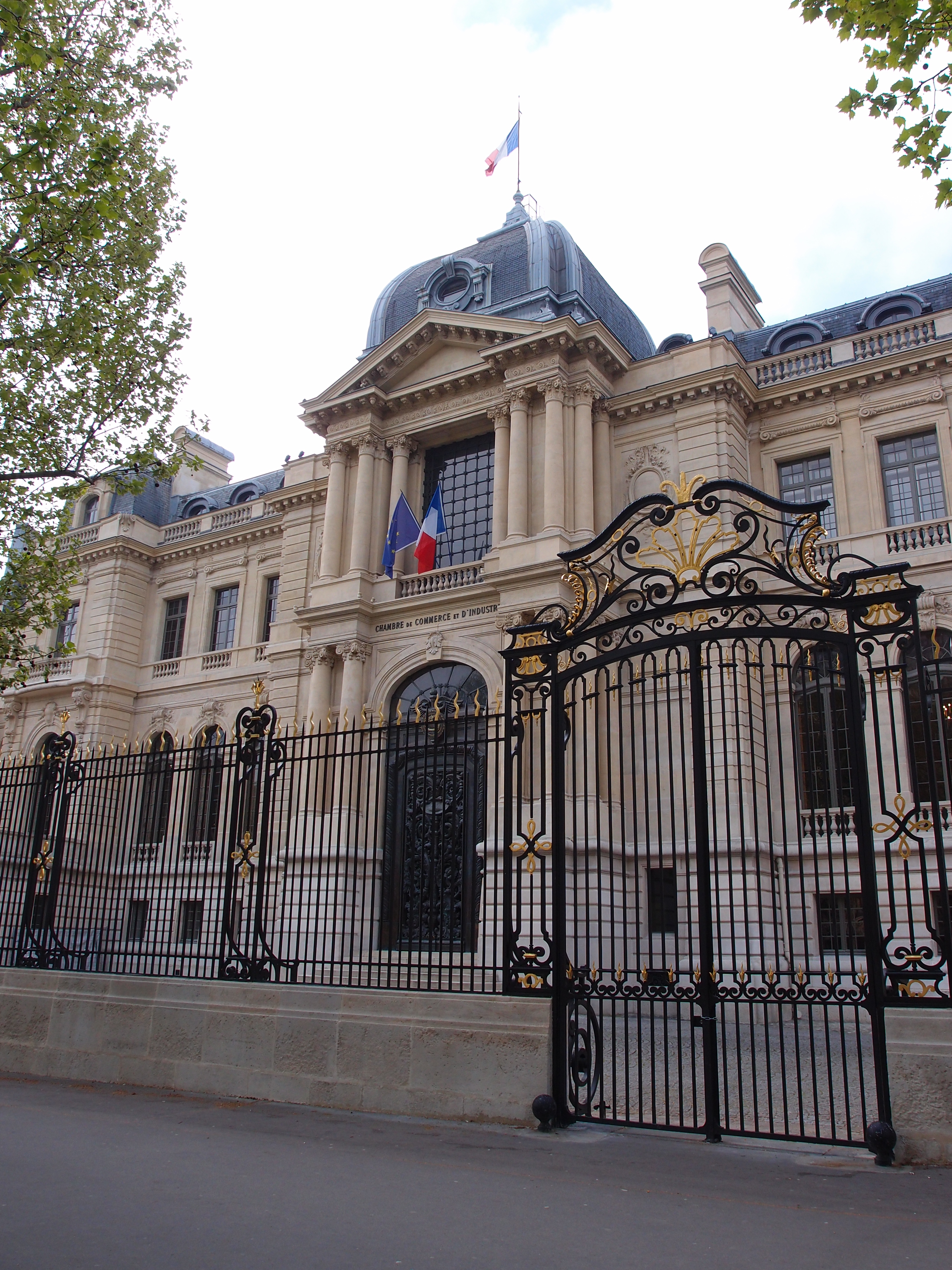
Hôtel Potocki

The hôtel Potocki is an hôtel particulier built in the Art Deco architectural style and located in the 8th arrondissement of Paris. It was built by the architect Jules Reboul for the Polish count Mikołaj Szczęsny Potocki of the Potocki family.

It has been the property of the Paris Île-de-France Regional Chamber of Commerce and Industry since 1923.

== History ==
The palace was once the location of the fashionable salon of Countess Emanuela Potocka. After the death of Potocka's son in 1923, the hôtel was bought by the Paris Île-de-France Regional Chamber of Commerce and Industry. The stables (made of pink marble) were replaced by two new wings for the building.

Since 2019, the hôtel Potocki is open to the public. In 2023, the Chamber of Commerce and Industry announced it was moving to a new building by 2025.
