= ESIEE =

Network of French graduate schools

ESIEE (École supérieure d'ingénieurs en électrotechnique et électronique) is a network of French graduate schools (grande école) composed of two graduate schools of engineering known as ESIEE Paris, ESIEE Amiens, and one graduate school of management called ESIEE Management.

== History ==
In 1904 the Breguet school was founded and kept this name until the 1960s. It was a graduate school of engineering in the field of electronics and electricity. In 1968 the school was renamed ESIEE Paris and is operated by the Paris Chamber of Commerce. In 1992 another branch of the school opened in Amiens; ESIEE Amiens. In 1995 the ESIEE Management was created (formerly known as the Institut Supérieur de Technologie et de Management).

== ESIEE Paris ==
ESIEE Paris
- École Supérieure d'Ingénieurs en Électrotechnique et Électronique
- Motto: L'école de l'innovation technologique
- Motto in English: The Schools of technological innovation
- Type: Grande école
- Established: 1904
- Affiliations: Université Gustave Eiffel, Paris Île-de-France Regional Chamber of Commerce and Industry, Conférence des Grandes Écoles
- Director: Jean Mairesse
- Students: 2,000
- Postgraduates: 500 engineers / year
- Location: Marne-la-Vallée, France
- Website: esiee.fr

ESIEE Paris is a general engineering school. All engineering students of ESIEE Paris hold the same degree : "Diplôme d'ingénieur ESIEE Paris" (master of Engineering ESIEE Paris). The school is accredited by Cti and Eur-Ace. Approximately 500 of the 2,200 students in Paris graduate every year and 60% of them spent at least 1 semester studying or working outside France. Depending on their specialization, they can attend classes in its 650 m^{2} (7000 ft^{2}) clean room. It is known as the first engineering school to have students design and launch an artificial satellite, named SARA, in 1991, as part of extracurricular work in ESIEESPACE, a student club.

During the last two years, students in Paris choose a specialization among the following subjects:

- Computer science
- Biotechnology & e-healthcare
- Energies
- Manufacturing
- Industrial engineering - Supply chain and digital
- Signal processing & telecommunications
- Network engineering
- Electronics and microelectronics
- Embedded systems
- Data science & artificial intelligence
- Cyber security
- Manufacturing systems engineering

ESIEE launched master of science programs in nano-science MEMS, electronic engineering and system on a chip, programs to which international students and 4th and 5th year ESIEE students may participate.

=== Rankings ===
ESIEE Paris is one amongst the top 10 Grandes écoles in the post-bac category (as opposed to post-prépa) according to the French magazine L'Étudiant in 2013 and the school is graduated as first in Paris Region in 2020.

== ESIEE Amiens ==
ESIEE Amiens
- École Supérieure d'Ingénieurs en Électrotechnique et Électronique d'Amiens
- Motto: Inventer le futur
- Motto in English: Let's invent the future
- Type: Grande école
- Established: 1992
- Director: Pierre Loonis
- Students: 450
- Postgraduates: 100 engineers / year
- Location: Amiens, France
- Website: Official website in French

Approximately 80 of the 450 students in Amiens graduate every year. During the last two years, students in Amiens choose a specialization among the following subjects:

- Building services engineering
- Computer networks and telecommunications
- Electrical engineering and sustainable development
- Manufacturing systems

== ESIEE Management ==
ESIEE Management is a business school for high tech projects where management and technologies are inseparable. Courses are based on learning management concepts and the knowledge of a technical subject. The academic disciplines and the 10 months of internship allow graduate students to be quickly effective in companies. The possibility to spend the third year in a foreign country gives the opportunity for students to pursue an international career.

The academic specializations are:

- Management and Biotechnology or Bioindustry
- Management and Computer Science or Digital Communications
- Management and Advanced Materials or Integrated Engineering

== Alumni ==
The three schools share the same alumni association called AA-ESIEE. The mission of the association is to strengthen and support the alumni network of ESIEE by developing contacts, friendship and mutual assistance among its members. The AA-ESIEE is headquartered in the 17th arrondissement of Paris.
