= Régis Lacote =

French CEO (born 1972)

- Born: Régis Lacote; 25 April 1972 (age 54)
- Education: Master of Science; Mastère spécialisé
- Alma mater: ESIEE Amiens; École nationale de l'aviation civile
- Occupation: CEO of Charles de Gaulle Airport
- Predecessor: Marc Houalla

Régis Lacote (born 25 April 1972) is a French airport executive. He has served as the director of Charles de Gaulle Airport since November 2022.

== Biography ==
A graduate from the ESIEE Amiens (1997) and the ENAC (Mastère spécialisé in airport management 1997), he began his career in 1998 as Safety Manager of the Roland Garros Airport. He joined the Paris Aéroport group in 2002, where he performed several jobs. In February 2018, he became CEO of the Orly Airport. In November 2022, he was appointed CEO of Paris Charles de Gaulle Airport, replacing Marc Houalla.
