= Paris Île-de-France Regional Chamber of Commerce and Industry =

French chamber of commerce

- Chambre de commerce et d'industrie de région Paris - Île-de-France
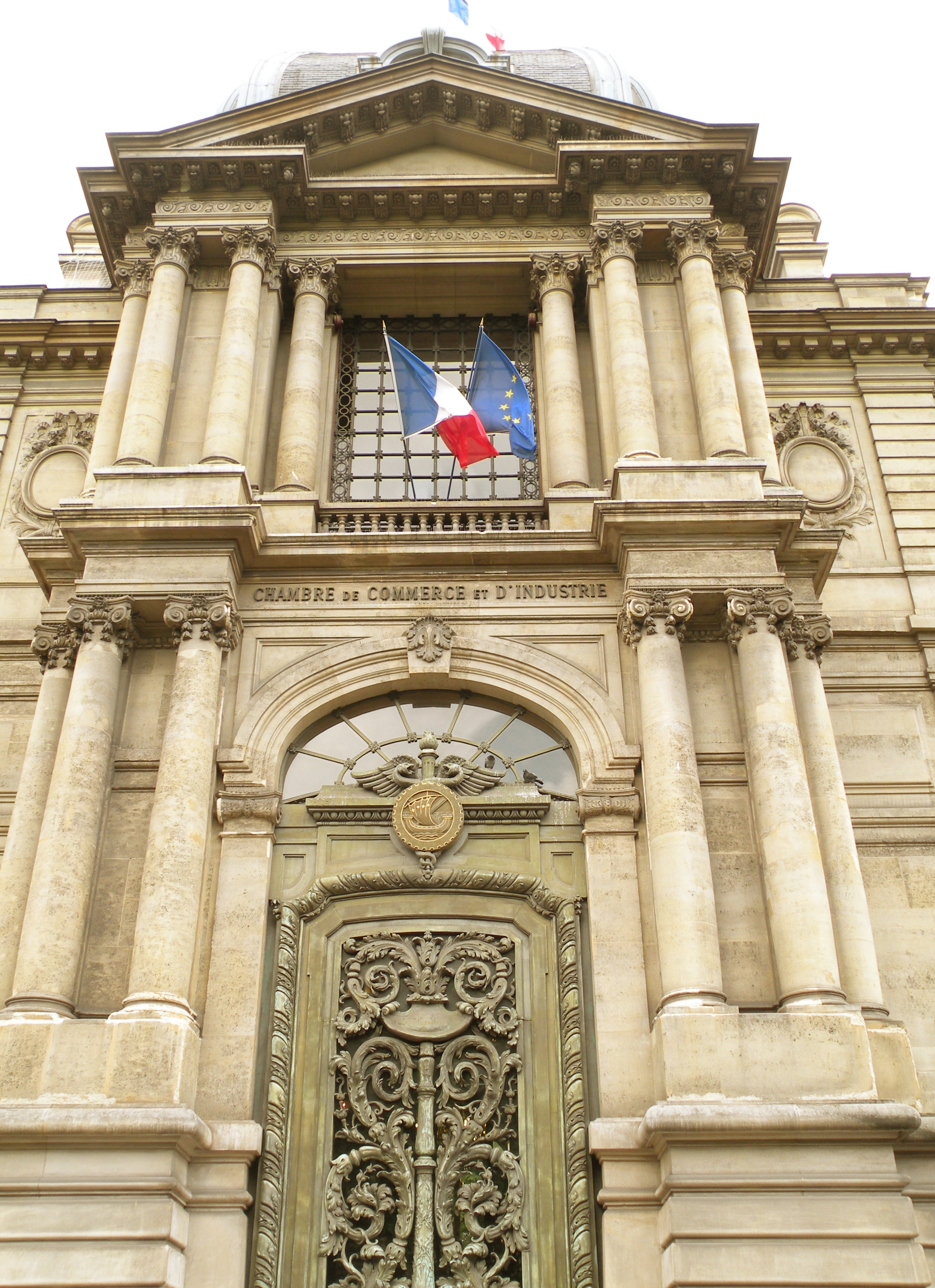
- Hôtel Potocki, headquarters on the Avenue de Frieldland.
- Formation: 1 January 2013
- Headquarters: 27 Avenue de Friedland, 75008 Paris
- Location: Paris, France
- Coordinates: 48.8741°N 2.30144°E
- Official language: French
- Website: Official website

The Paris Île-de-France Regional Chamber of Commerce and Industry (French: Chambre de commerce et d'industrie de région Paris - Île-de-France) is a French chamber of commerce that supports businesses in Paris and the Île-de-France, created on 1 January 2013 through a merger of several smaller chambers of commerce.

== Predecessors ==
The Paris Chamber of Commerce (Chambre de commerce de Paris) was created on 25 February 1803 by the Consulate. It succeeded the Council of Commerce, Arts and Manufactures of the Seine (Conseil de Commerce, Arts et Manufactures de la Seine), created in 1801 as a successor to the six Corps des Marchands de Paris which provided some of the functions of the Chamber of Commerce under the Ancien Régime before the French Revolution. In 1970 it became the Paris Chamber of Commerce of Industry (Chambre de commerce et d’industrie de Paris, CCIP). In 1966, in addition to the Department of the Seine, the constituency of the CCIP was extended to cover the Departments of Paris, Hauts-de-Seine, Seine-Saint-Denis and Val-de-Marne.

The Chamber of Commerce and Industry of Versailles was created on 22 November 1899. In 1966 it was expanded to cover the departments of Yvelines and Val-d'Oise, as the Versailles-Val-d'Oise-Yvelines Chamber of Commerce. The Corbeil Chamber of Commerce was established on 22 November 1899. It became the Chamber of Commerce and Industry of Essonne in 1969. The Chamber of Commerce and Industry of Seine-et-Marne industry was founded in 2004 following the merger of CCIs of Meaux and Melun.

The Regional Chamber of Commerce and Industry (RCCI) Paris Ile-de-France was created in 1964. It covered the eight departments of the Île-de-France region.

== Creation ==
The Chambre de commerce et d'industrie de région Paris - Île-de-France was created on 1 January 2013, combining eight chambers of commerce of the area in and around Paris. The merger brought together six departmental CCI (Paris, Hauts-de-Seine, Seine-Saint-Denis, Val-de-Marne, Val d'Oise, Yvelines Versailles) and the two territorial CCI (Seine-et -Marne and Essonne). That day the Chambre de commerce et d'industrie départementale de Paris became a division of the CCI de région Paris Ile-de-France. It has its headquarters at 2 Place de la Bourse and provides operational services at the Bourse de commerce.

== See also ==
- Paris Chamber of Commerce

== Sources ==
- "Décret n°66-571 du 30 juillet 1966 relatif à la chambre de commerce et d'industrie de Versailles". Legifrance (in French).
- "Historique" (in French). CCI Essonne. 8 June 2010. Archived from the original on 14 October 2013.
- "Les missions de la CCI Paris" (in French). CCI Paris Ile-de-France.
- Flamand, Philippe (9 January 2013). "La CCI Paris Île-de-France enfin créée" (in French). L'Express.
