= Amiens =

Capital of Somme, France

Amiens Anmien(s) / Anmyin (Picard)
- Prefecture and commune
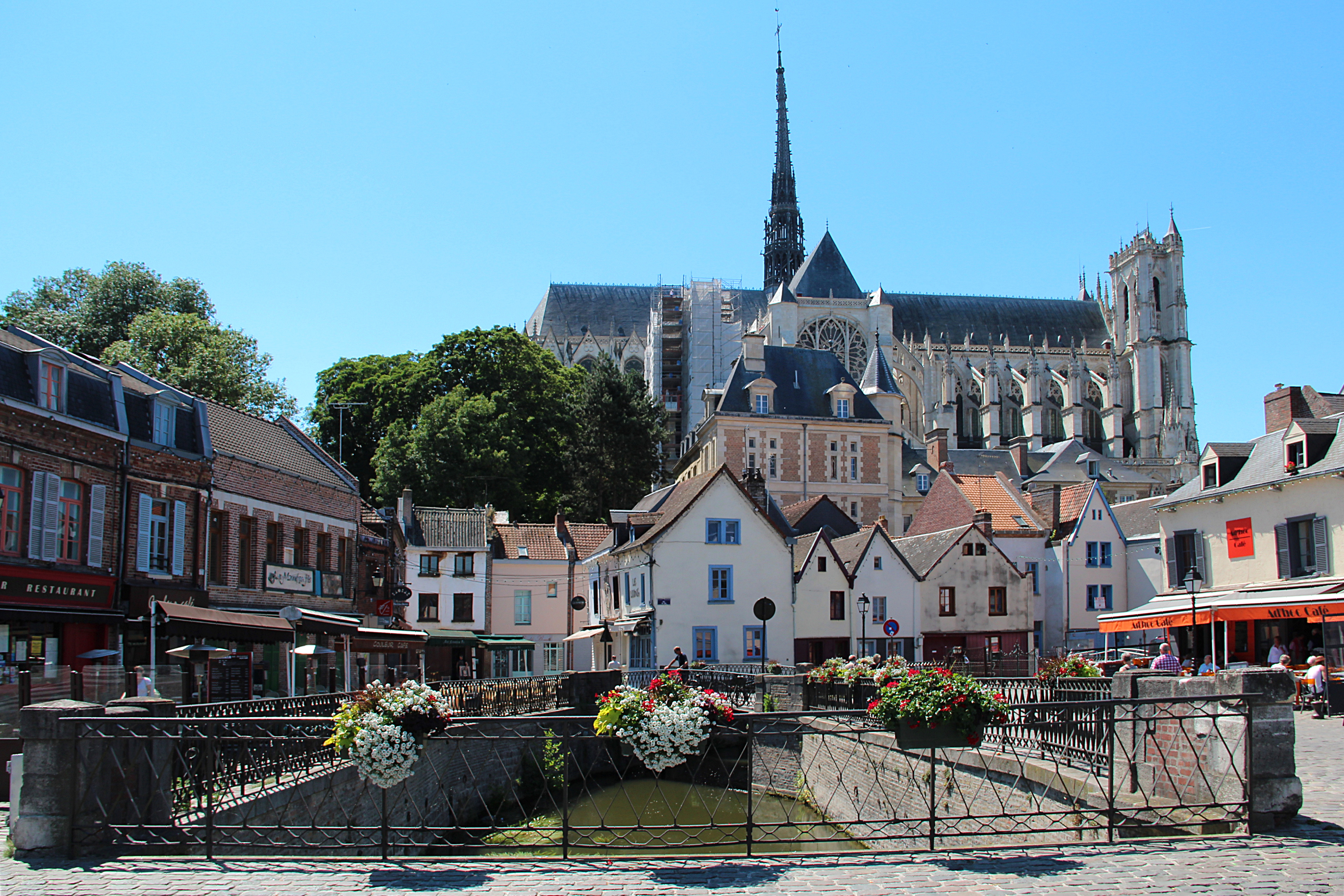
- City centre, with Amiens Cathedral in the background

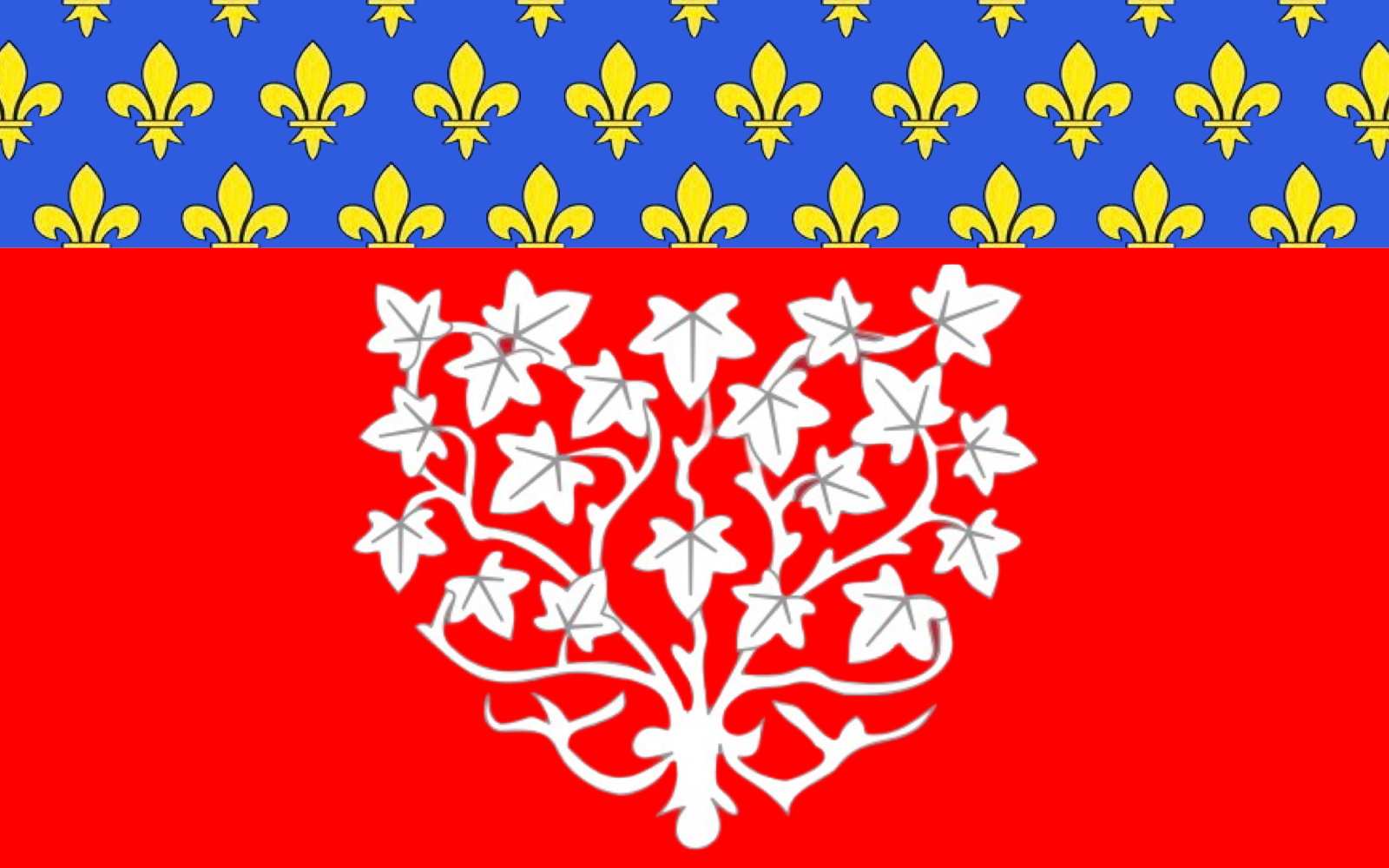
- Flag Coat of arms

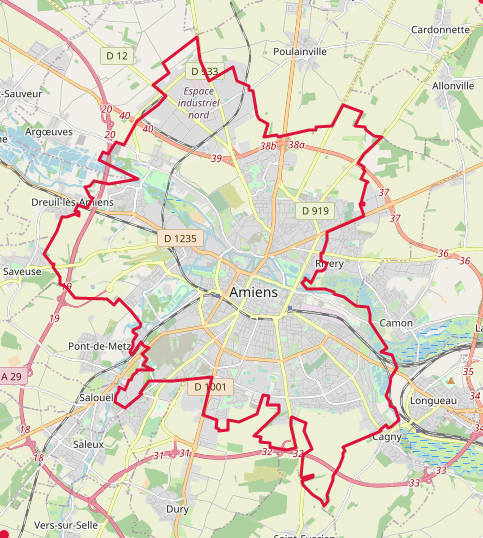
- Location of Amiens
- Location within France Location within Hauts-de-France
- Coordinates: 49°53′31″N 2°17′56″E
- Country: France
- Region: Hauts-de-France
- Department: Somme
- Arrondissement: Amiens
- Canton: Amiens-1, 2, 3, 4, 5, 6 and 7
- Intercommunality: Amiens Métropole

Government
  - Mayor (2026–32): Frédéric Fauvet
- Area^{1}: 49.46 km^{2} (19.10 sq mi)
- Elevation: 33 m (108 ft)
- Highest elevation: 106 m (348 ft)
- Lowest elevation: 14 m (46 ft)
- Population (2023): 136,449
  - Density: 2,759/km^{2} (7,145/sq mi)
  - Urban (2017): 163,876
  - Metro (2018): 387 354
- Demonym: Amiénois
- Time zone: UTC+01:00 (CET)
  - Summer (DST): UTC+02:00 (CEST)
- INSEE/Postal code: 80021 /80000
- Website: www.amiens.fr
- ^{1} French Land Register data, which excludes lakes, ponds, glaciers > 1 km^{2} (0.386 sq mi or 247 acres) and river estuaries.

Amiens (English: /æˈmjæ̃/ or /ˈæmiənz/ AM-ee-ənz; French: [amjɛ̃]; Picard: Anmien, Anmiens or Anmyin) is a city and commune in northern France, located 120 km (75 mi) north of Paris and 100 km (62 mi) southwest of Lille. With 136,449 inhabitants (2023), it is the prefecture of the Somme department in the Hauts-de-France region. A central landmark of the city is Amiens Cathedral, the largest Gothic cathedral in France. Amiens also has one of the largest university hospitals in France, with a capacity of 1,200 beds. The author Jules Verne lived in Amiens from 1871 until his death in 1905, and served on the city council for 15 years. Amiens is the birthplace of current French president Emmanuel Macron.

The town was fought over during both World Wars, suffering significant damage, and was repeatedly occupied by both sides. The 1918 Battle of Amiens was the opening phase of the Hundred Days Offensive which directly led to the Armistice with Germany. The Royal Air Force heavily bombed the town during the Second World War. In the aftermath, the city was rebuilt according to Pierre Dufau's plans with wider streets to ease traffic congestion. These newer structures were primarily built of brick, concrete and white stone with slate roofs. The architect Auguste Perret designed the Gare d'Amiens train station and nearby Tour Perret.

Amiens has an important historical and cultural heritage, on which a significant amount of tourism is based. Apart from the cathedral, there are the hortillonnages, the Jules Verne House, the Tour Perret, the Musée de Picardie, the zoo, and the Saint-Leu and Saint-Maurice neighborhoods. A total of 60 monuments are listed in the inventory of monuments historiques, over 1600 places and monuments listed in the general inventory of cultural heritage, and 187 objects listed in the inventory of monuments historiques. During December, the town hosts the largest Christmas market in northern France. It is known for a few local foods, including "macarons d'Amiens", almond paste biscuits; "tuiles amienoises", chocolate and orange curved biscuits; "pâté de canard d'Amiens", duck pâté in pastry; "la ficelle Picarde", an oven-baked cheese-topped crêpe; and "flamiche aux poireaux", a puff pastry tart made with leeks and cream.

== History ==
The first known settlement at this location was Samarobriva ("Somme bridge"), the central settlement of the Ambiani tribe, one of the principal tribes of Gaul. The Romans named the town Ambianum, meaning settlement of the Ambiani people. Amiens was part of Francia starting from the 5th century. The Normans sacked the city in 859 and again in 882.

In 1113, the city was recognized by King Louis VI of France, and in 1185 it was linked to the Crown of France. In 1597, Spanish soldiers held the city during the six-month Siege of Amiens, before Henry IV regained control. During the 18th and 19th century, the textile tradition of Amiens became famous for its velours. As a result of the French Revolution, the provinces of France were dismantled and the territory was organised into departments. Much of Picardy became the newly created department of Somme with Amiens as the departmental capital. During the Industrial Revolution, the city walls were demolished, opening up space for large boulevards around the town center. The Henriville neighborhood in the south of the city was developed around this time. In 1848, the first railway arrived in Amiens, linking the city to Boulogne-sur-Mer. During the 1870 Battle of Amiens, the city was occupied by invading Prussian forces.

The town was fought over during both the First and Second World Wars, suffering significant damage and being occupied several times by both sides. The 1918 Battle of Amiens was the opening phase of the Hundred Days Offensive which led directly to the Armistice with Germany that ended the war. In June 1944 following D-Day, Amiens was heavily bombed by the Royal Air Force. The town was liberated by British forces on 31 August. The city was rebuilt according to Pierre Dufau's plans with a focus on widening the streets to ease traffic congestion. These newer structures were primarily built of brick, concrete and white stone with slate roofs. The architect Auguste Perret designed the Gare d'Amiens train station and nearby Tour Perret.

== Geography ==
=== Location ===
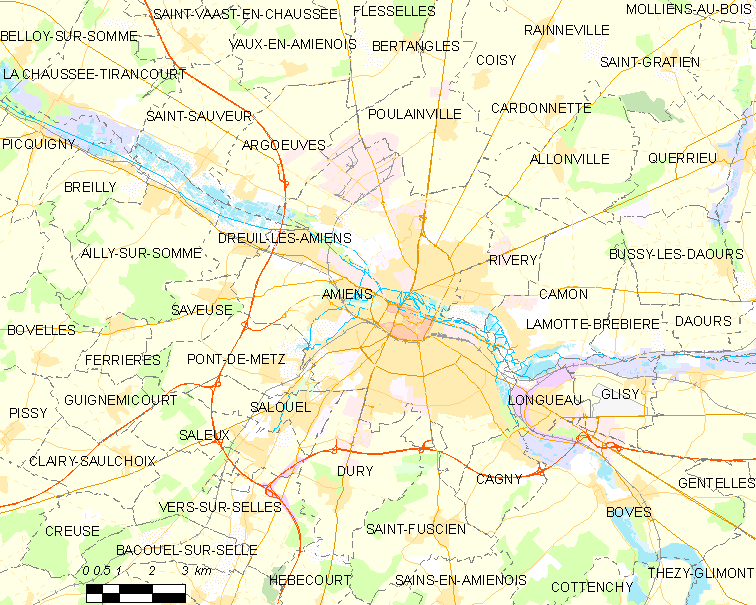
Map of the Amiens and its surrounding communes

Amiens, once regional prefecture of the former Picardy Region, is the prefecture of the Somme department, one of the three departments (with Oise and Aisne) in the region. Located in the Paris Basin, the city benefits from a privileged geographical position, with close proximity to Paris, Lille, Rouen, London and Brussels. At the crossroads of major European routes of travel (A1, A16 and A29), the city is also at the heart of a major rail star.

As the crow flies, the city is 115 kilometres (71 mi) north of Paris, 97 kilometres (60 mi) south-west of Lille, 100 kilometres (62 mi) north-east of Rouen, 162 kilometres (101 mi) east-north-east of Le Havre and 144 kilometres (89 mi) north-west of Reims. At the regional level, Amiens is located 53 kilometres (33 mi) north of Beauvais, 71 kilometres (44 mi) west of Saint-Quentin, 66 kilometres (41 mi) from Compiègne and 102 kilometres (63 mi) from Laon.

In area, Amiens is the third-largest settlement in the Somme, after Crécy-en-Ponthieu and Hornoy-le-Bourg.

=== Geography and relief ===
The area of the commune is 4,946 hectares (12,220 acres); the altitude varies between 14 and 106 metres (46 and 348 ft).

=== Hydrography: Somme and canal, Avre and Selle ===
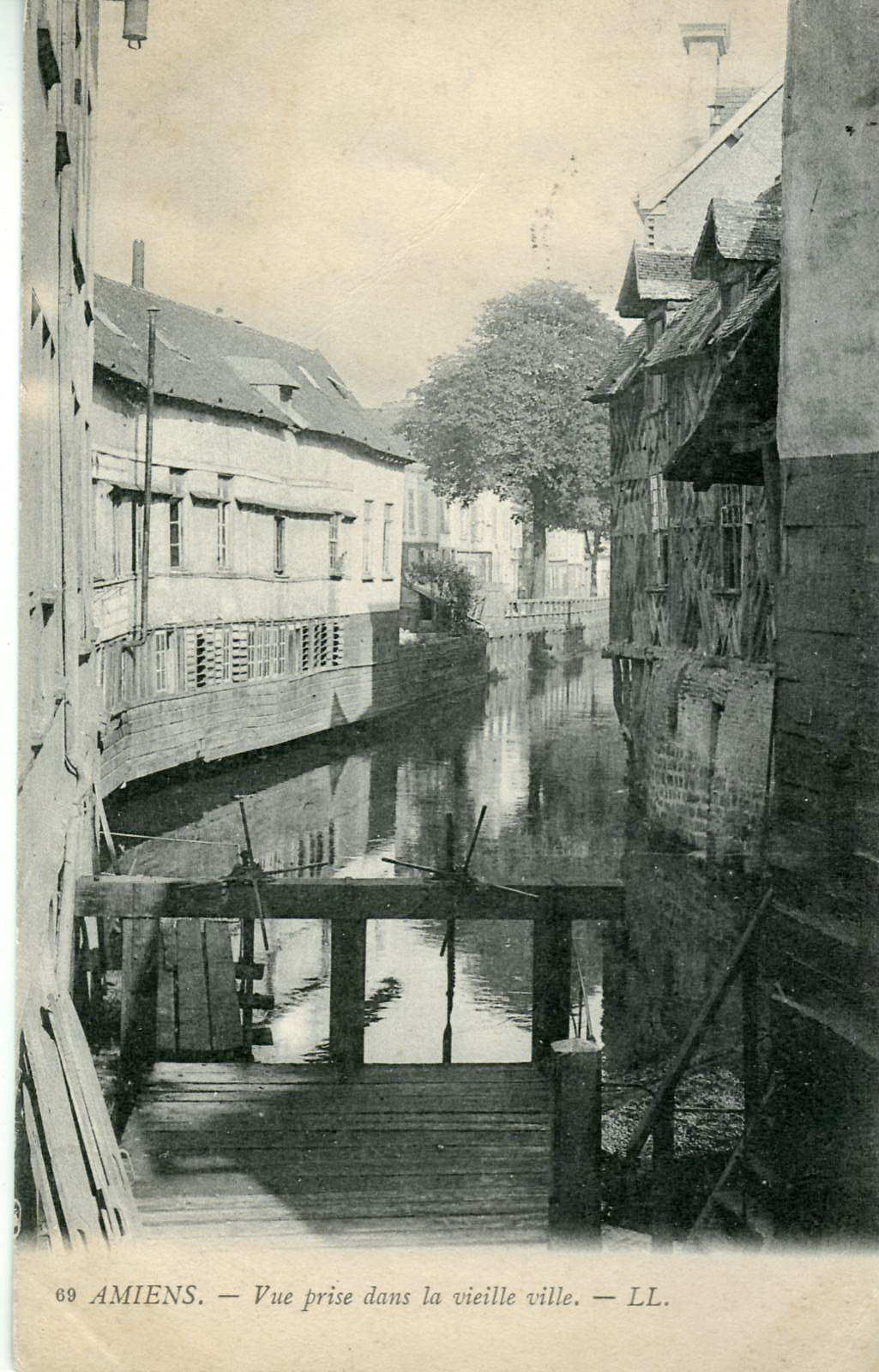
The Somme in the old town at the beginning of the 20th century

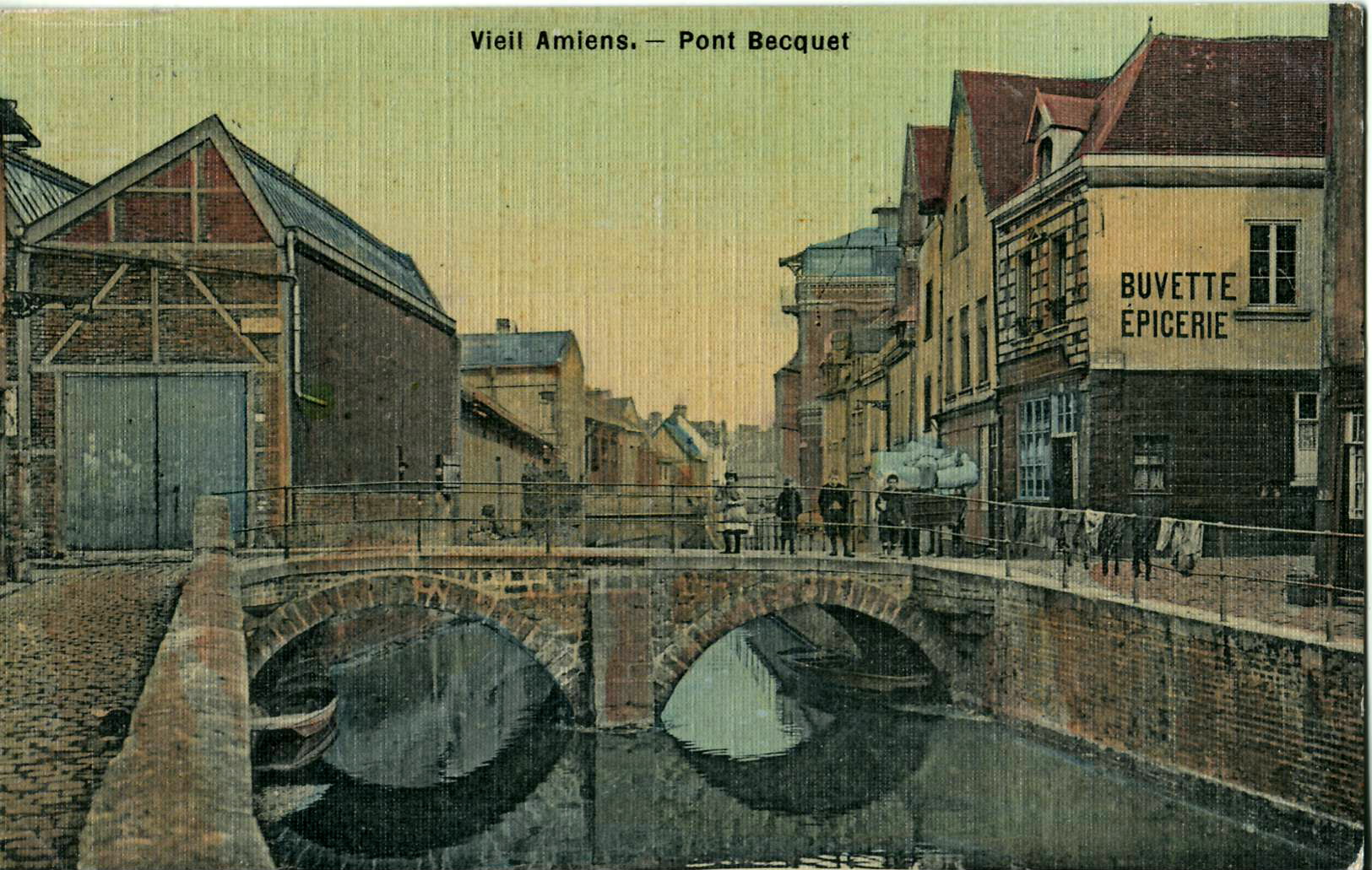
The Becquet Bridge, at the start of the 20th century

The main stem of the River Somme passes through Amiens and is generally benign, except during exceptional floods that can last up to several weeks (such as in spring 2001). It is also, on its southeastern outskirts, close to Camon and Longueau, the confluence with its main tributary on the left bank (to the south), and the Avre. The Selle enters from the northwest of Amiens, with two arms (including the Haute Selle) passing behind the Unicorn Stadium, the exhibition park, the megacity and horse racing track, then passing the end of the Promenade de la Hotoie and the zoo of Amiens, and to the right of the water treatment plant, in front of the island Sainte-Aragone, opposite the cemetery of La Madeleine in Amiens.

The city developed in a natural narrowing of the river due to the advance of the rim of the Picard plateau in Saint-Pierre (ford crossing). The Amiens citadel is built on this limestone butte of the Picard plateau and Rue Saint-Pierre is a slightly inclined path to leave the city from the north. At this narrowing, a network of narrow canals led to the construction of bridges and buildings including textile mills in the Middle Ages.

The marshes of the old bed of the river Somme was used to dig peat. Farmers maintained rieux, canals and ditches by cleaning out the silt and used it to append to their vegetable garden plot. During the 20th century maintenance of the canals was stopped and gardens were gradually left to lie fallow or sold to private individuals who created pleasure gardens accessible by boat.

The hydrographic network has always been an important city-operated asset. The river helped shape the identity of the landscape, urban and economic territory. It is around the Saint-Leu and Saint-Maurice neighborhoods that border the River Somme, as well as most of the administrative and civil area of the current city center which the city has developed since antiquity.

The Canal de la Somme dates from the beginning of the 19th century and the bridge at the foot of the citadel was built after World War II.

=== Climate ===
Amiens has the typical oceanic climate of the north of France, with relatively mild winters, cool summers, and rainfall well distributed throughout the year.

Climate data for Amiens(Amiens – Glisy Aerodrome), elevation: 60 m (197 ft), 1991–2020 normals, extremes since 1988
Month	Jan	Feb	Mar	Apr	May	Jun	Jul	Aug	Sep	Oct	Nov	Dec	Year
Record high °C (°F)	15.8 (60.4)	19.4 (66.9)	24.1 (75.4)	26.7 (80.1)	31.5 (88.7)	36.0 (96.8)	41.7 (107.1)	38.1 (100.6)	34.2 (93.6)	28.0 (82.4)	20.7 (69.3)	17.1 (62.8)	41.7 (107.1)
Mean daily maximum °C (°F)	6.7 (44.1)	7.8 (46.0)	11.5 (52.7)	15.2 (59.4)	18.5 (65.3)	21.6 (70.9)	23.9 (75.0)	24.0 (75.2)	20.5 (68.9)	15.6 (60.1)	10.5 (50.9)	7.1 (44.8)	15.2 (59.4)
Daily mean °C (°F)	4.2 (39.6)	4.7 (40.5)	7.5 (45.5)	10.1 (50.2)	13.5 (56.3)	16.5 (61.7)	18.7 (65.7)	18.7 (65.7)	15.6 (60.1)	11.8 (53.2)	7.6 (45.7)	4.7 (40.5)	11.1 (52.0)
Mean daily minimum °C (°F)	1.6 (34.9)	1.6 (34.9)	3.4 (38.1)	5.1 (41.2)	8.4 (47.1)	11.4 (52.5)	13.4 (56.1)	13.3 (55.9)	10.7 (51.3)	8.0 (46.4)	4.7 (40.5)	2.2 (36.0)	7.0 (44.6)
Record low °C (°F)	−14.6 (5.7)	−12.7 (9.1)	−10.0 (14.0)	−3.9 (25.0)	−1.2 (29.8)	0.1 (32.2)	4.5 (40.1)	5.2 (41.4)	1.0 (33.8)	−5.4 (22.3)	−9.5 (14.9)	−13.5 (7.7)	−14.6 (5.7)
Average precipitation mm (inches)	48.8 (1.92)	45.0 (1.77)	45.3 (1.78)	39.4 (1.55)	55.9 (2.20)	54.6 (2.15)	58.9 (2.32)	59.9 (2.36)	48.4 (1.91)	57.7 (2.27)	60.4 (2.38)	72.3 (2.85)	646.6 (25.46)
Average precipitation days (≥ 1.0 mm)	10.1	9.7	9.8	8.3	9.6	8.7	8.2	9.0	8.1	10.4	11.1	11.8	114.9
Mean monthly sunshine hours	63.7	86.5	146.9	206.3	202.7	220.3	224.0	188.1	168.0	116.9	71.1	66.5	1,760.9
Source: Meteociel

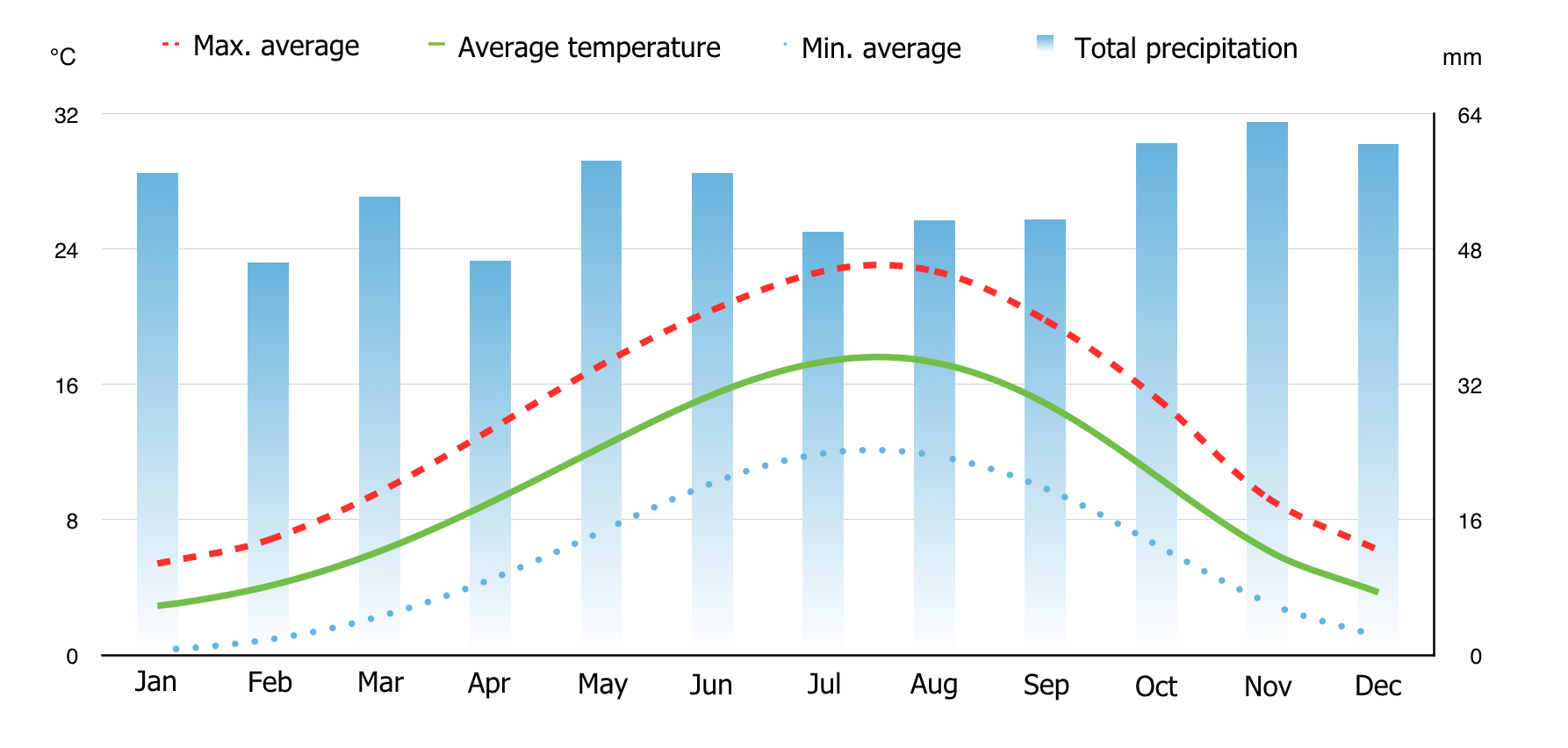

=== Transport ===
Amiens is a hub between the Île de France and the rest of northern France; Normandy and Benelux; and France and Great Britain. Amiens is not directly on principal European road and rail arteries, such as the A1 motorway and the Paris-Lille TGV train line, at present.

However, due to its position halfway between the urban areas of Lille and Paris, Amiens has good conditions for service and accessibility, including motorways (at the junction of the A16 and A29).

==== Rail ====
Amiens station is served by regional train services to destinations that include Rouen, Calais, Lille, Reims, Compiègne and Paris-Nord. Saint-Roch (Somme) station in the western part of the city is served by local trains towards Rouen and Abbeville. A regular bus route with the TGV Haute-Picardie station also provides access to the Charles-de-Gaulle Airport station. On the horizon of 2025, the Roissy–Picardie Link will put Amiens 55 minutes from Paris Charles-de-Gaulle Airport and its TGV station.

By train, Amiens is located at:

- 1 hour 5 minutes from Paris (16 round-trip trains per day)
- 1 hour 15 minutes from Lille
- 1 hour 15 minutes from Rouen
- 2 hours 30 minutes from Brussels
- 3 hours 30 minutes from Lyon
- 3 hours from London

==== Roads ====
Since antiquity, Amiens has been a crossroads of important routes. The contemporary city is served by the A16 and A29 autoroutes. The Jules Verne Viaduct, 943 metres (3,094 ft) long, crosses the River Somme to the east of the city and allows circumvention of the city by motorway-type roads. The A16 and A29 autoroutes, the RN1 and the RN25 form a bypass-type motorway around the city that the population has called the Rocade d'Amiens or Amiens ring road. Initially constituting national roads which are downgraded today, mostly as departmental roads, the greater urban area of Amiens is served by:

- RN 1 to Beauvais and Paris, to the South, and towards Abbeville, Calais, Dunkirk and the Belgian border, northwest.
- RN 25 towards Doullens, Saint-Pol-sur-Ternoise and Arras
- RD 1029 towards Yvetot and Neufchâtel-en-Bray to the west, Saint-Quentin and La Capelle in the east.
- RD 929 to Albert and Bapaume and Cambrai.
- RD 935 towards Compiègne.
- RD 919 to Mailly-Maillet and Arras.
- RD 933 to Bernaville and Auxi-le-Château.
- RD 934 to Roye and Noyon.

Amiens is served by several motorways:

- A16 to Calais via Abbeville and Boulogne-sur-Mer
- A16 to Paris via Beauvais
- A29 to Rouen and Le Havre via Neufchâtel-en-Bray
- A29 to Reims via Saint-Quentin and Laon
- The proposed A24 autoroute from Amiens to Lille via Doullens was cancelled in 2006.

==== Parking ====
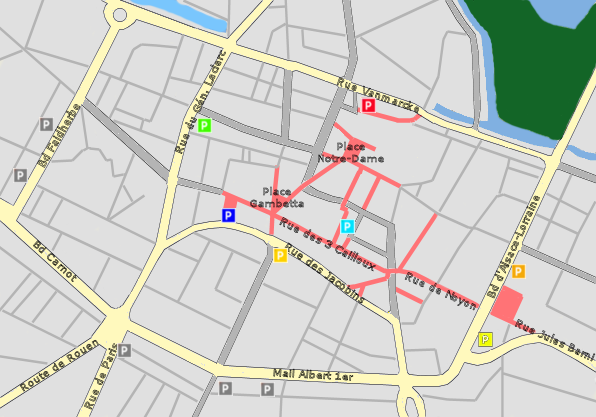
Map of parking in the city center of Amiens in 2009 Town Hall Halles Jacobins Trois Cailloux Saint-Leu Amiens 2 Perret Free outdoor parking

According to the urban transport plan (PDU) approved 19 December 2013 for the period 2013–2023 parking supply is considered abundant in Amiens. Although important, demand for parking is less than what is available (capacity reserves are still 20% minimum: If the road is sometimes saturated, the occupancy rate of the underground parking remains globally less than 100%).

In 2013, the city counted approximately 70,000 public parking spaces, including 8,400 in the city center and in its immediate vicinity, where 70% of places are paid.

- 4,400 spaces on highways (1,950 in the inner city, including 1,600 paid)
- 4,000 spaces in underground parking (620 other new places are programmed in a project for the Gare La Vallée development zone).

As of 2007, a residential parking system has been deployed in Saint-Anne ward to cope with congestion in the streets caused by SNCF railway station users. During the campaign for the municipal election of 2008, parking was one of the important topics of debate. A year after the change of majority, the Gilles Demailly team launched a consultation with the population. From 2011, residential parking was extended to the Gare-La-Vallée and Riolan neighborhoods, then in 2012 to the Noyon neighborhood and the area east of the Riolan sector. In 2014, 2,600 parking spaces were affected by this system which allowed city residents more parking near their homes in order to promote a better rotation of vehicles in the streets and reduce permanent occupation of public space by the cars cluttering the highway.

==== Public transport ====
Amiens was once served by two tram lines with a combined length of 10.7 kilometres (6.6 mi), opened in 1887. They intersected at Place Gambetta, one linking La Madeleine Cemetery, the Church of Saint-Acheul, Cagnard bridge, Rue de Noyon and Rue Jules-Barni; the other from the Church of Saint-Pierre at the racecourse, by the streets of Saint-Leu, Frédéric-Petit and Colbert. Electrified in 1899, the network grew to seven lines totaling 19 kilometres (12 mi) in 1906. From 1932, Longueau was linked to Amiens by a bus service. German bombing in 1940 destroyed most of the city center and hit the Jules-Ferry Road tram depot, totally destroying the tram fleet. Only the Longueau bus survived. A few old Parisian buses were also used in an extremely reduced service. These buses as well as the surviving bus were then converted to city gas and equipped with tanks on the roof covered by a huge white dome. This service continued until approximately 1946. There were only two urban lines: An east–west line (Saint-Acheul – Montieres) and a northeast–southwest line (Beauville – road to Rouen). It was decided after the war to serve the city by a trolleybus with one route to Longueau. This was only in part realized, serving Saint-Acheul, Rouen, La Madeleine and Saint-Pierre. In 1964, trolleybuses were abandoned and the bus became ubiquitous in Amiens transportation.

The current public transport network consists of a bus network managed by the Ametis mixed economy company, whose network covers Amiens Métropole, the agglomeration of Amiens. The establishment of dedicated bus lanes began in 2006. Former Mayor Gilles de Robien had envisioned the creation of a tram, but the choice of dedicated bus lanes had been preferred for reasons of cost and patronage. His successor, Mayor Gilles Demailly, had been considering the development of a TSCP in the metropolitan area. As a result of numerous studies and conferences, elected representatives voted for the creation of a tram at the municipal Council of 15 November 2012. The project had been endorsed by the Communauté d'agglomération Amiens Métropole on 18 December 2012 and the commissioning of a first north–south tram route was scheduled for 2018/2019. Following the elections of 2014, which were a defeat for most municipal and community carriers of the project, the new mayor of Amiens Brigitte Fouré, and by extension the new president of Amiens Métropole Alain Gest, decided to suspend the project at least during the time of their respective mandates, thus applying a campaign promise (the tram was at the heart of debate) and despite a project announcement of trams on tyres (of TVR type). Improvement of public transit would then be only by that of the bus network. Indeed, in December of the same year, the Community Council approved funding for a study (the sixth in 20 years) relating to the establishment of a rapid transit bus network (BHNS), which should enter into service in March 2019, and whose vehicles could be electric.

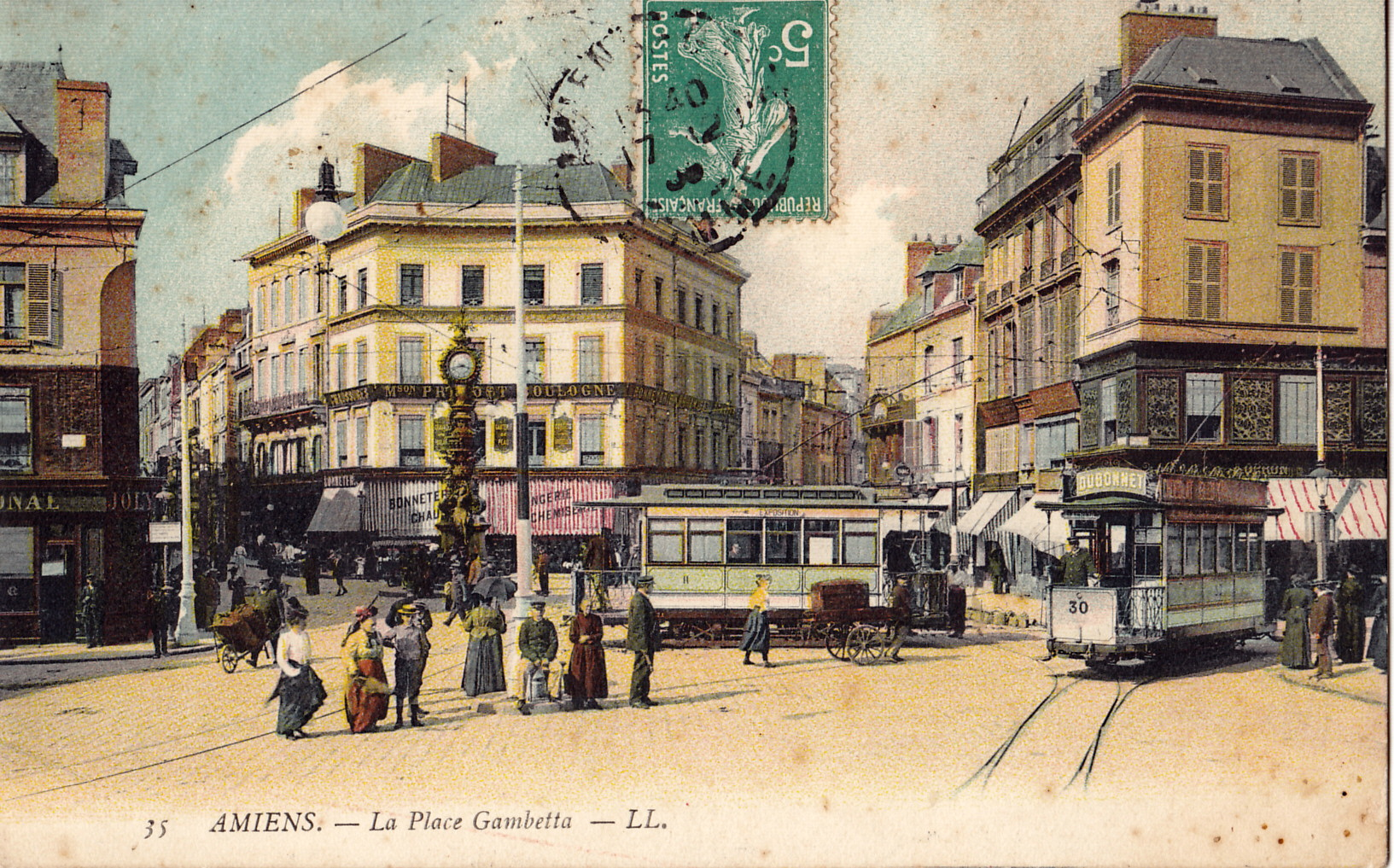
The Place Gambetta: An important hub of the former tram network of Amiens at the beginning of the 20th century

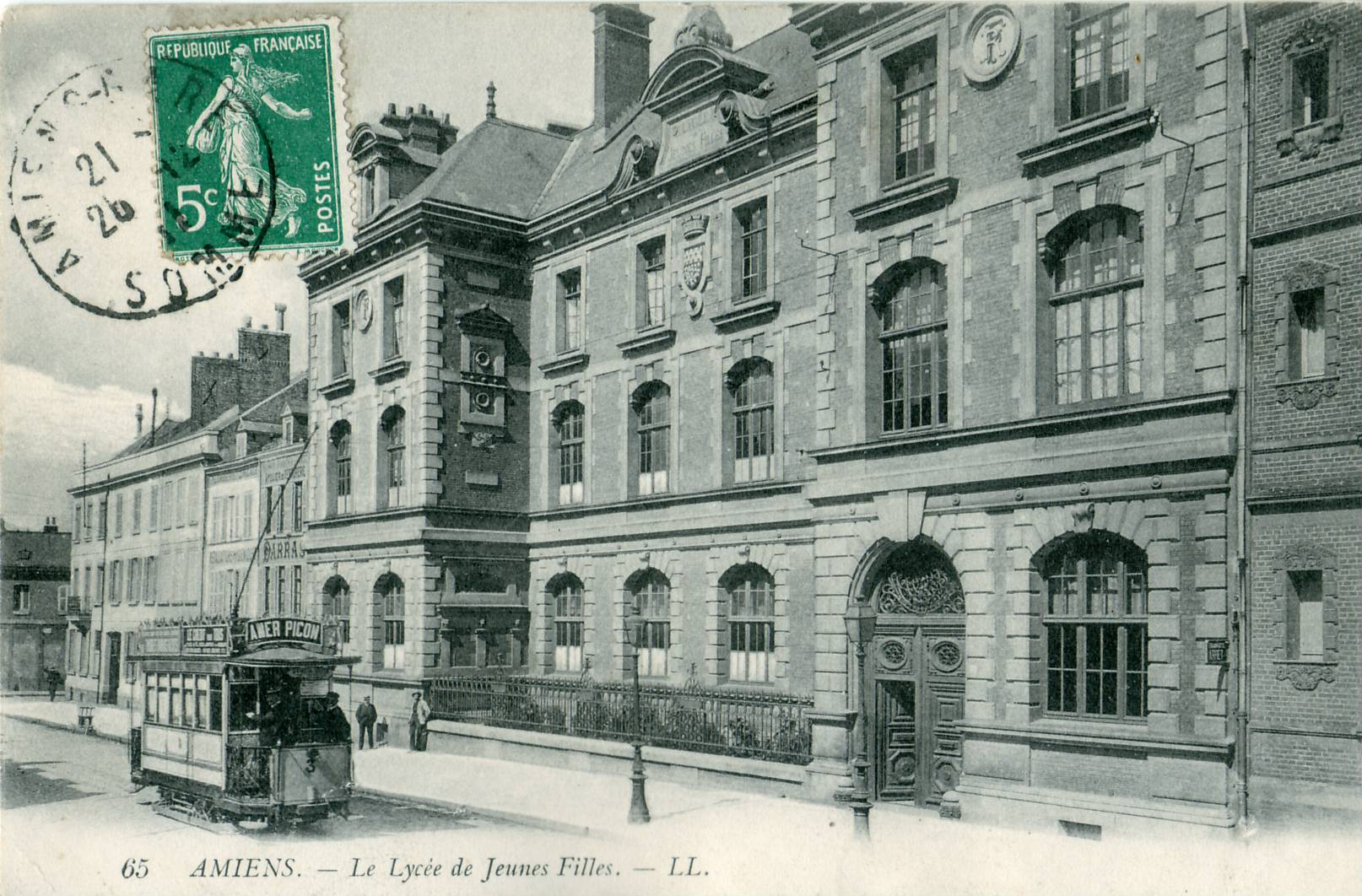
The lycée de jeunes filles and tramway, Rue des Otages, now Lycée Madeleine-Michelis

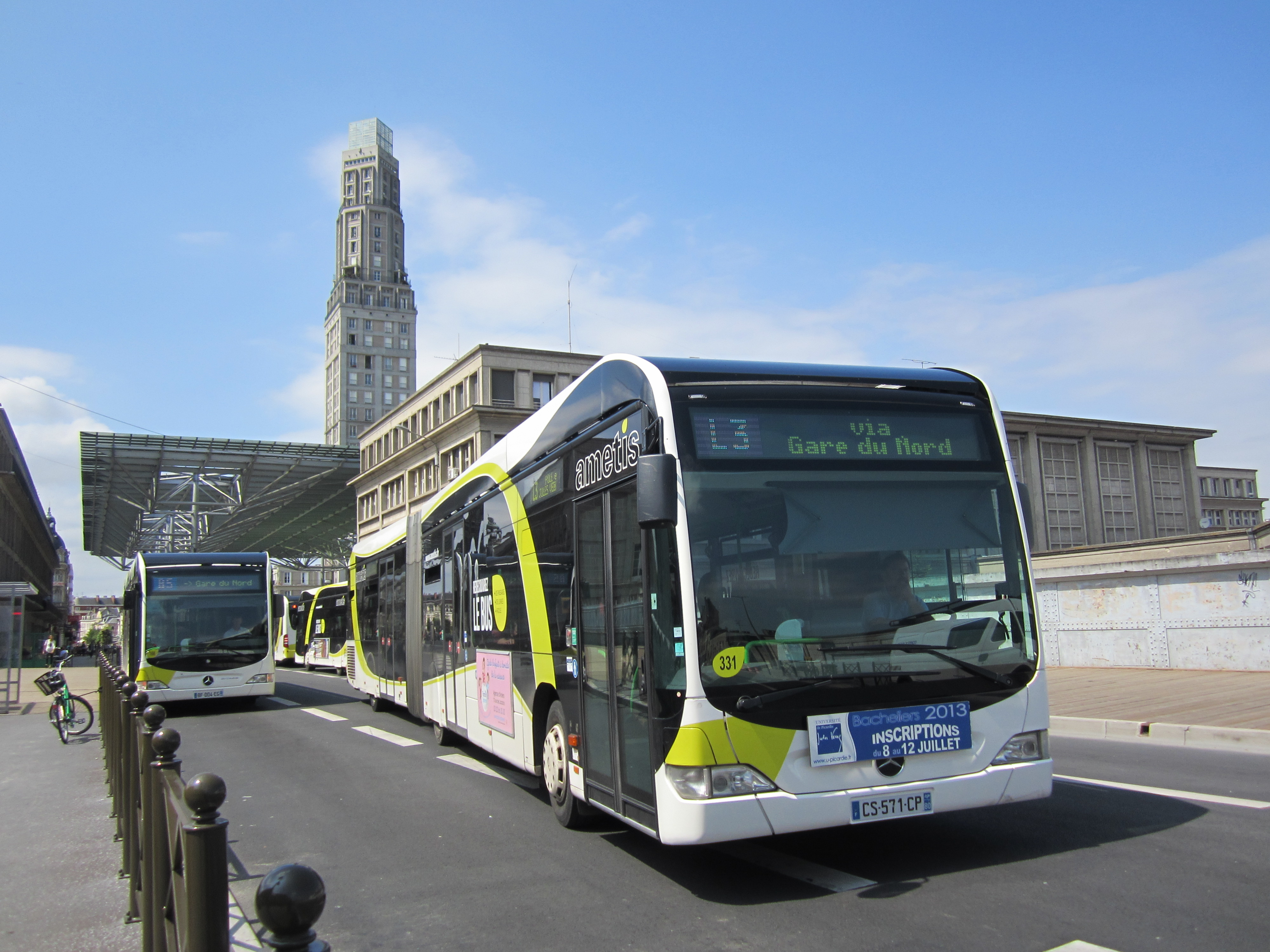
A bus of the Amiens public transport network

==== Cycle networks ====
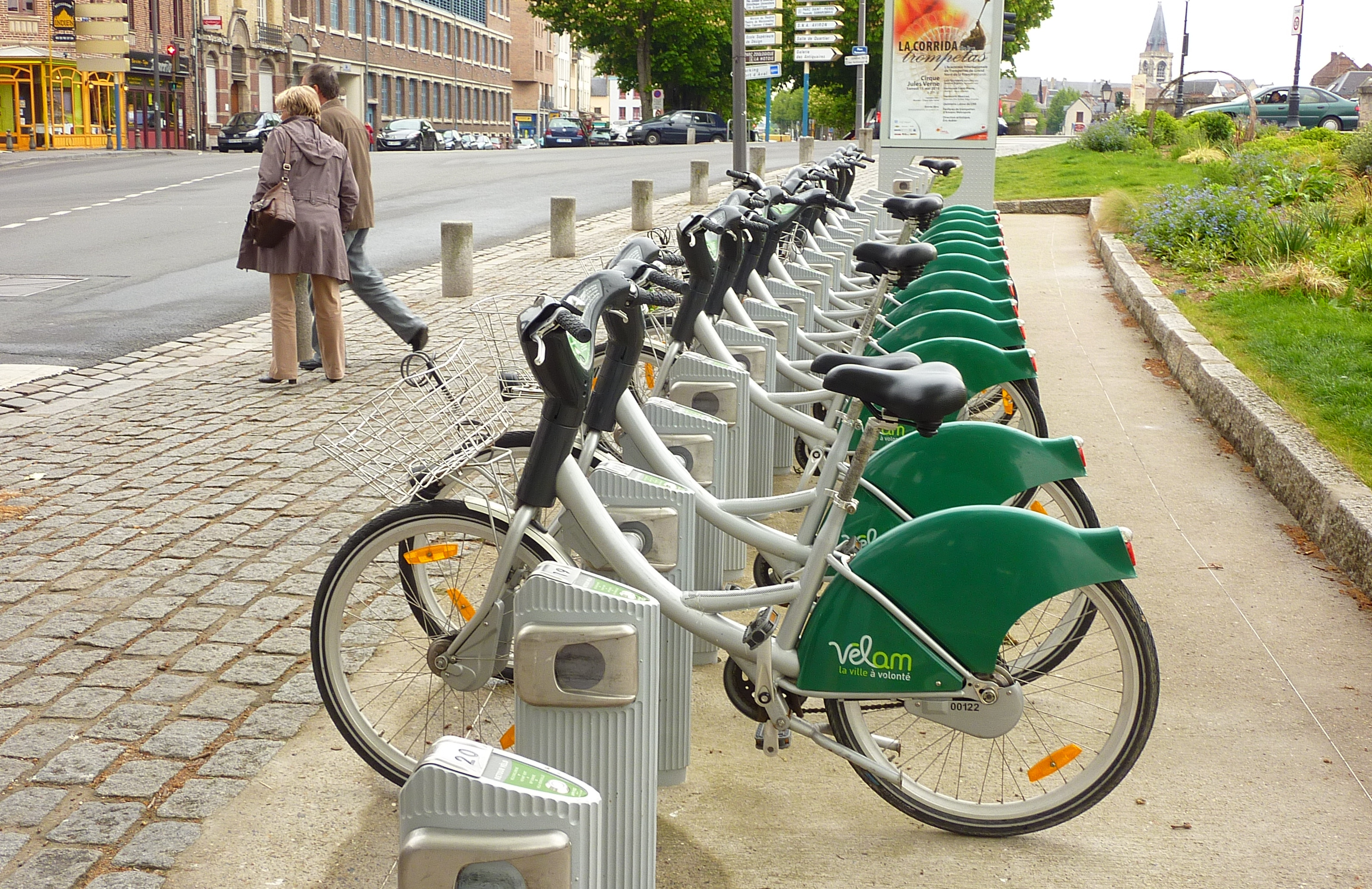
Vélam public bicycle sharing system in Amiens

Amiens has developed two bike services: Buscyclette and Velam.

- Buscyclette is a service of rental bikes on demand, created in May 1999. In 2014, nearly 2,400 "green bikes" are available for rent, essentially city bikes but also electric bikes (VAE), folding bicycles and specific bikes (such as kids bikes, child trailers, mountain bikes, cargo bikes, tandems). The rental period varies from half a day to one year.
- Velam is a bike sharing system created on 16 February 2008, an adaptation of the Cyclocity system managed by JCDecaux, similar to Vélo'v in Lyon and Vélib' in Paris. Velam offers 313 bikes distributed every 300 to 400 metres in the center of Amiens and 26 stations.

In 2012, Amiens Métropole had 100 kilometres (62 mi) of routes for cyclists. Despite the development of a bicycle plan in 1997 which was planning the development of 500 kilometres (310 mi) of equipped cycleways, the network of the territory in terms of paths is still incomplete.

The blueprint of the bicycle facilities of the agglomeration (SDAC) provides, over a period of 10 years (2014–2024), for 188 kilometres (117 mi) of cycle routes and equips 490 sites for the parking of bikes. This plan also includes the deployment of parking facilities over the entire territory of the city, close to the facilities frequented by bikers, as well as cyclist right-turns at traffic lights or even the maintenance of existing facilities.

==== Railways ====
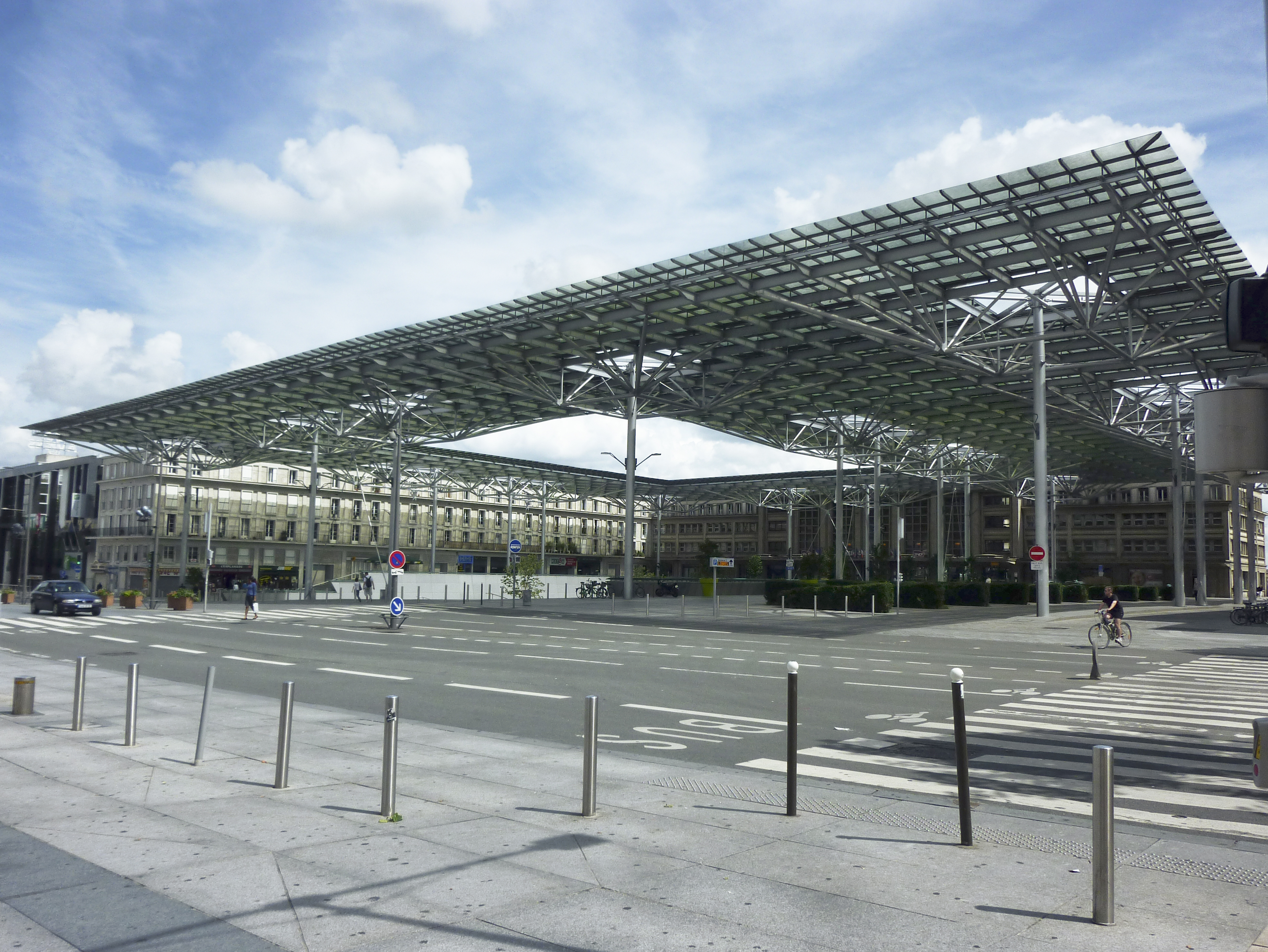
Gare du Nord and its canopy in August 2012

There are three railway stations:

- Two stations on the Paris-Boulogne and Amiens – Rouen lines:
- The Amiens station, main station, known as Gare du Nord, in memory of the Compagnie du Nord who created it. Every day, 15,000 travelers use its seven lines.
- The station of Saint-Roch

Connections from these two stations include to Lille via Arras and Douai, to Boulogne via Abbeville, to Paris-Nord via Creil or Compiègne, to Reims via Tergnier, and to Rouen.

- A station located on the Paris – Lille line in Longueau serving the south of Amiens and the communes of Longueau, Cagny, and Boves
- Longueau station, a passenger station of the historic railway hub in Longueau. Every day, 2,500 travellers use its two lines.
- Montieres station, station assigned to the freight traffic, it serves only the industrial zone of Amiens. This station is located on the former railway line of Doullens.

Many regional and extra regional links (Normandie, Grand Est and Île-de-France) pass through Amiens, especially by TER Hauts-de-France.

A station located 45 kilometres (28 mi) from Amiens, the Haute-Picardie TGV station, allows access to the TGV network. It is served by buses from Amiens. Its isolated character earned it the name of gare des betteraves, or gare betteraves, at the time of its construction.

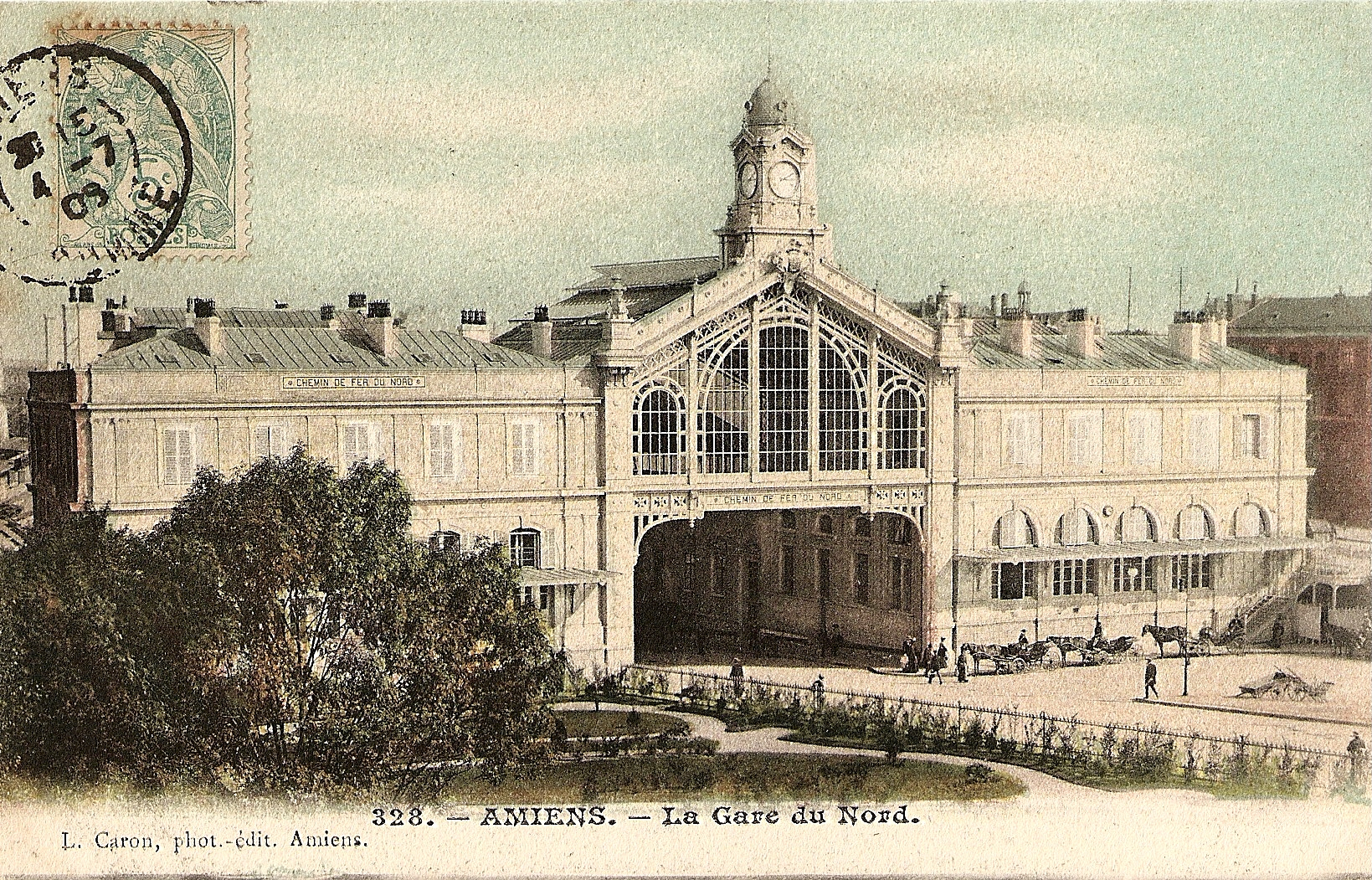
Gare du Nord (old postcard published by Caron No. 328, postmarked in 1909)

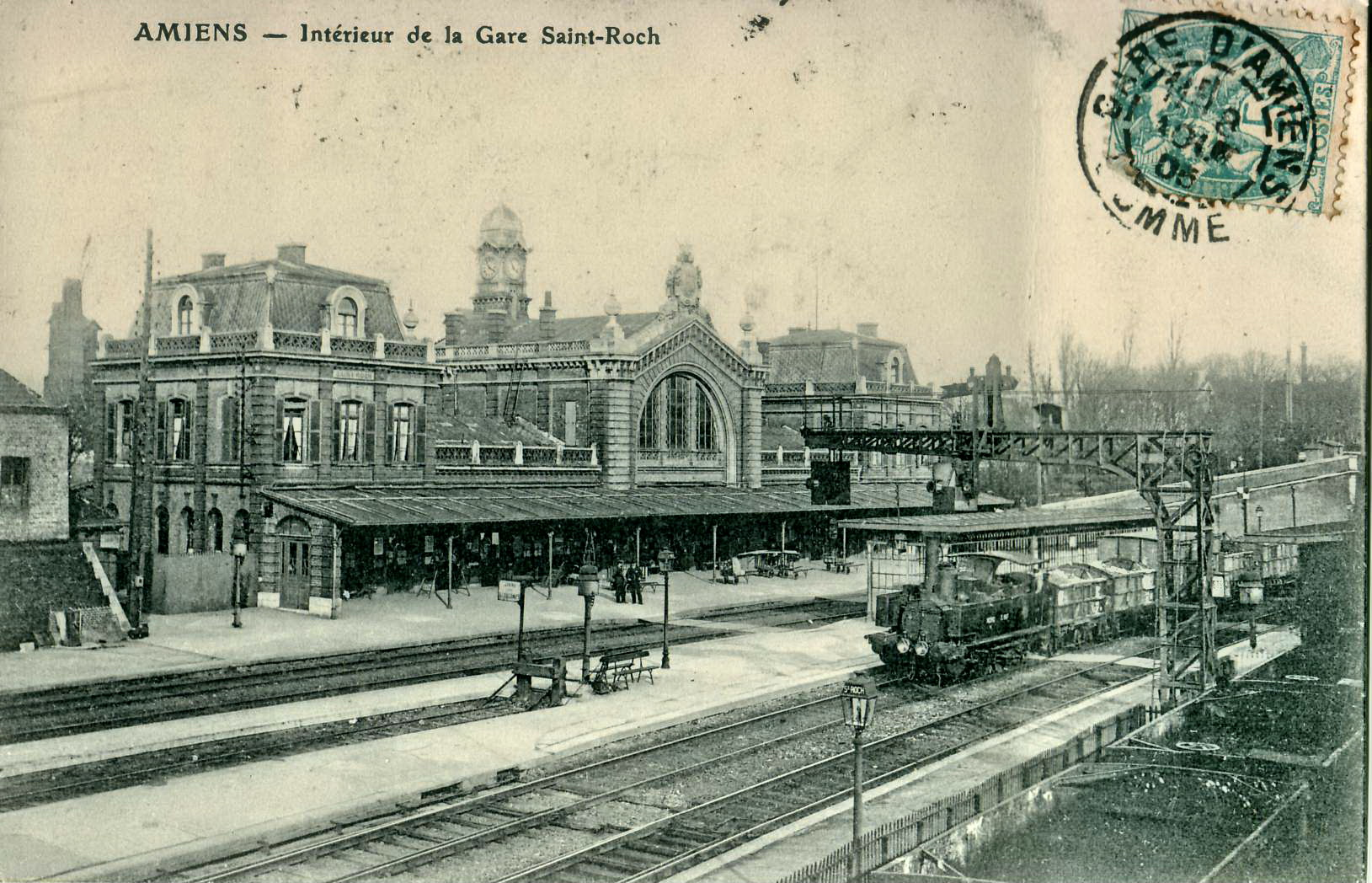
Inside Saint-Roch railway station (postcard postmarked in 1905)

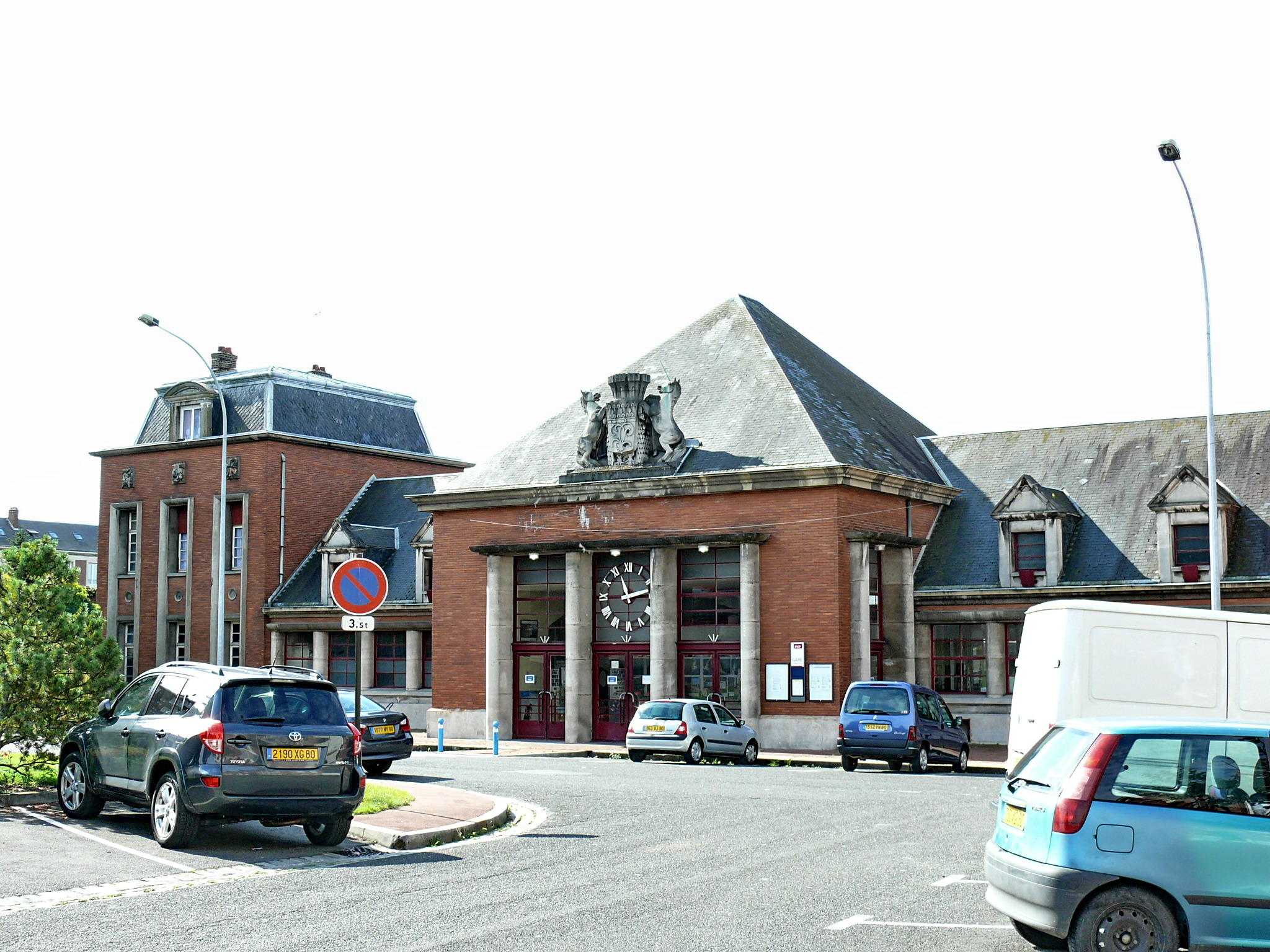
Gare Saint-Roch

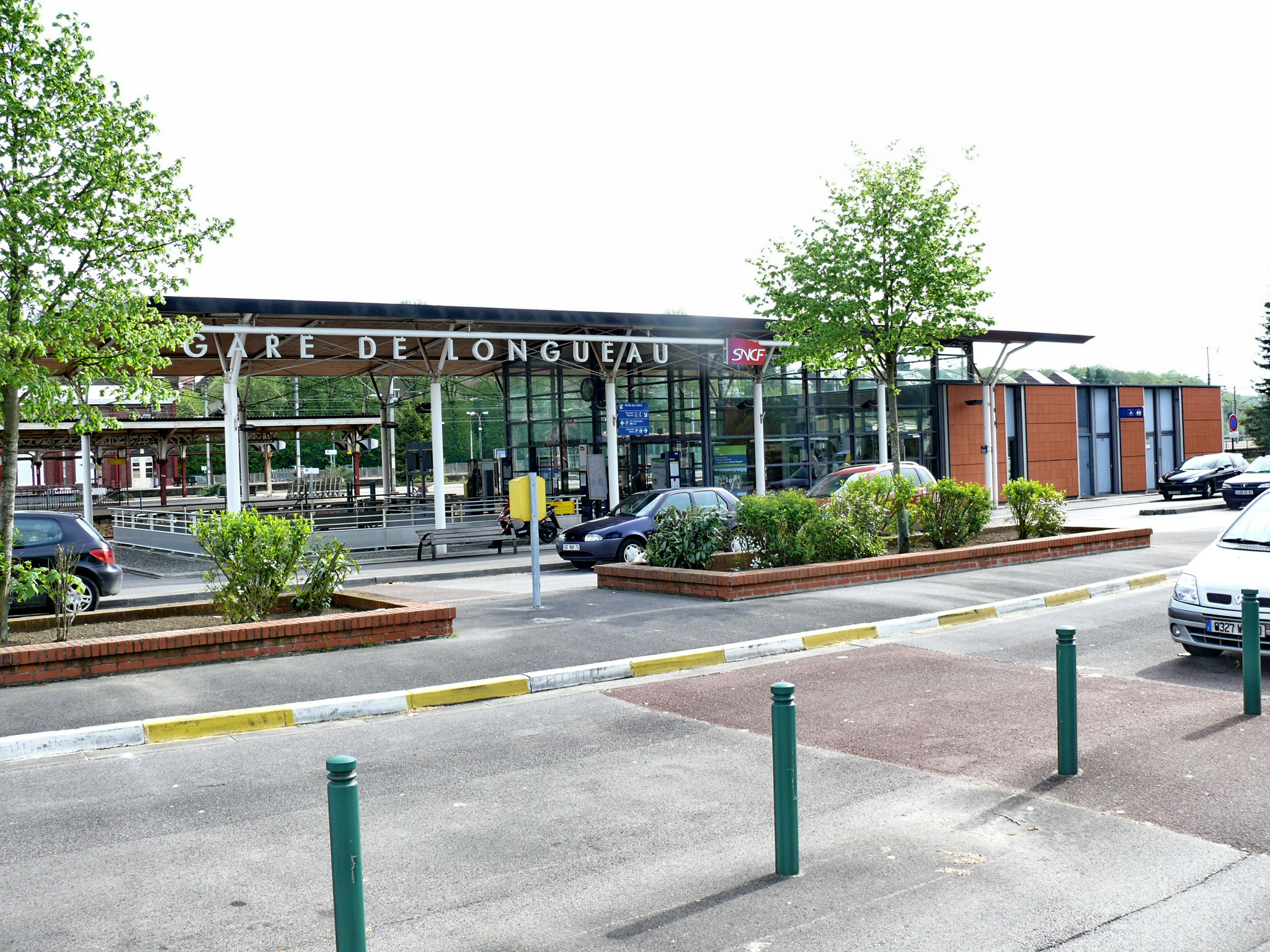
Gare de Longueau

==== Air transport ====
In addition to Amiens – Glisy Aerodrome, bordering the town's eastern edge 5 kilometres (3.1 mi) from the center, there are several airports nearby.

- Albert – Picardie Airport is located 20 minutes northeast of the city.
- Beauvais-Tillé Airport, the ninth largest French airport by usage, located 45 minutes by car south of the city, and served by a bus service from Amiens.
- Lille Airport, reachable by train or by road using the A29 and A1.
- Paris-Charles de Gaulle Airport, reachable by train or by road using the A29 and A1, or A16 and N104. The creation of a railway between Creil and Roissy will put Amiens 55 minutes from Paris Charles de Gaulle airport by 2020.

==== Waterways ====
The Somme canal runs through the town to the English Channel. This canal is linked to the Canal du Nord (Paris to Lille metropolitan area).

== Urbanism ==
=== Urban morphology ===
Amiens comprises a number of neighborhoods (French: quartiers) with their own characteristics, including Saint-Leu, St-Maurice, Henriville, and Saint-Acheul.

==== Saint-Leu neighborhood ====
St-Leu forms part of Amiens, north of the city center. It has many older wooden and brick houses and several canals. At the foot of the cathedral, traversed by canals, this picturesque area was largely rehabilitated during the 1990s. It extends to the Somme canal, located more to the north, at the foot of the Coteau Saint-Pierre on which the fortress of Jean Errard, called Citadelle, was built. Historically, it was the poor neighborhood of the city, where butchers, tanners and dyers gathered.

Amiens University's Faculty of Sciences, present since the 1960s, has been renovated and expanded on occasion. The Faculty of Law and Economics has also been transferred since the mid-1990s from the campus (offset to the south of the city) to its new location at the foot of the cathedral. (Note: Work had also been delayed, because some people wanted to "preserve the cathedral".) The open-air parking it replaces was a "gap" in the landscape dating from World War II. Nonetheless, it allowed an unobstructed view of the cathedral. Most of the buildings have been renovated and transformed into housing much of which is for students.

The area became the heart of the Amiens people's evenings, with many establishments (bars, restaurants, etc.) on Place du Don and Quai Bélu.

The church is found at Rue Saint-Leu, located just between the Faculty of Science and Law-Economy (UPJV).

Two theatres were established in the neighborhood, that of the Chés Cabotans (puppet shows in the Picard language) and the Maison du Théâtre at the foot of the Saint-Leu Church. There is also La Lune des Pirates, a concert hall.

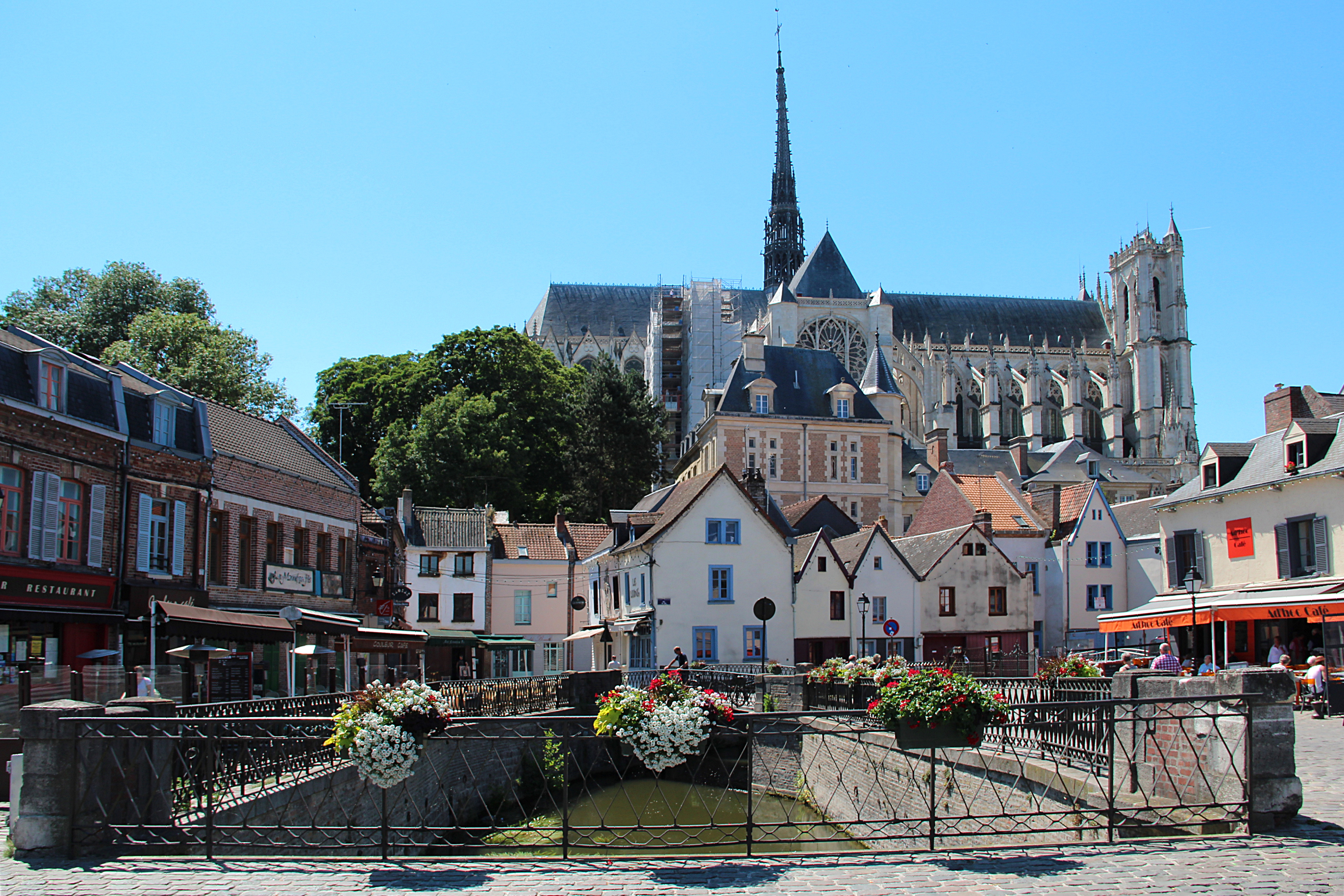
Place du Don: The River Somme and cathedral

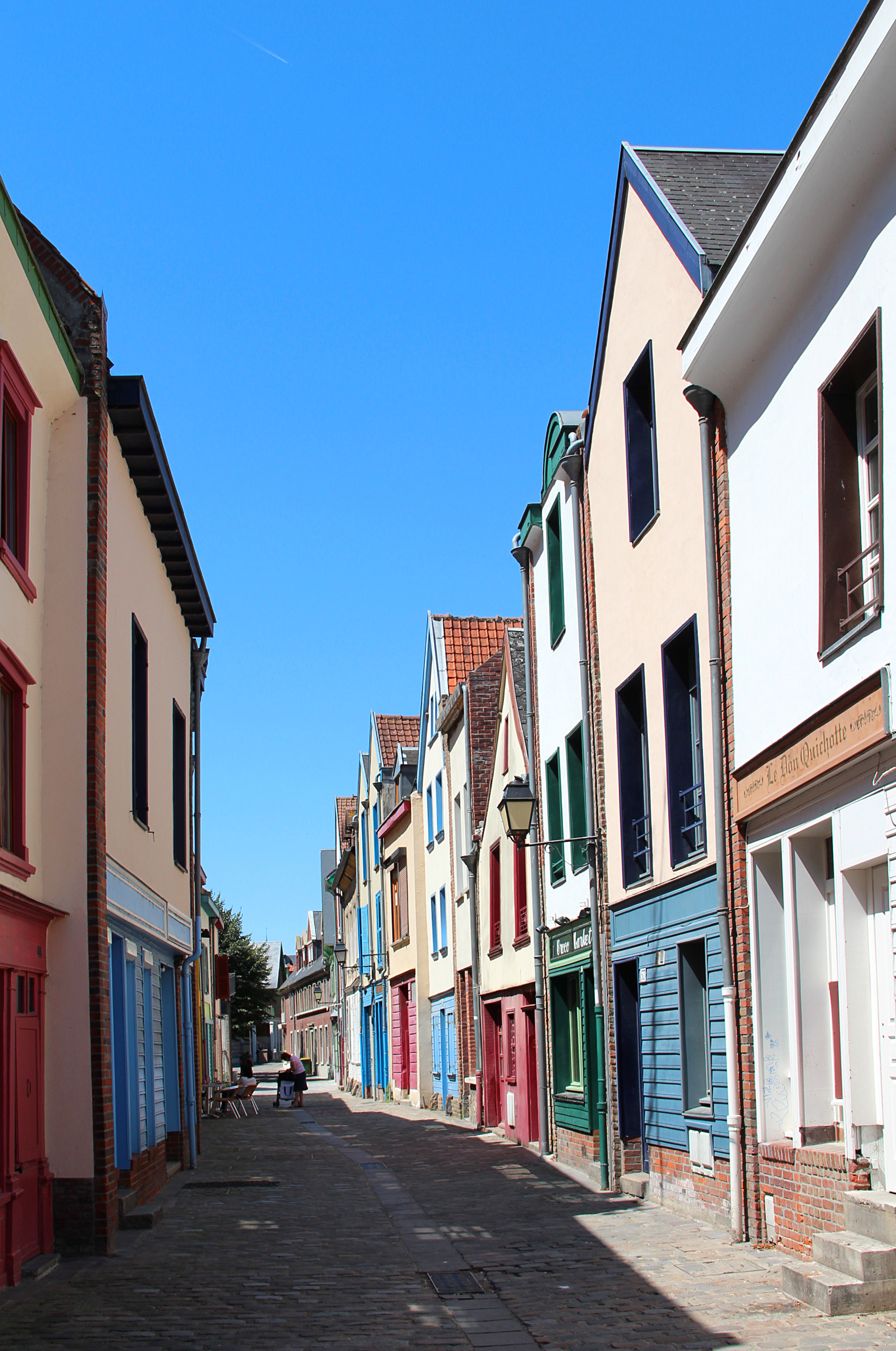
Saint-Leu: Rue du Hocquet

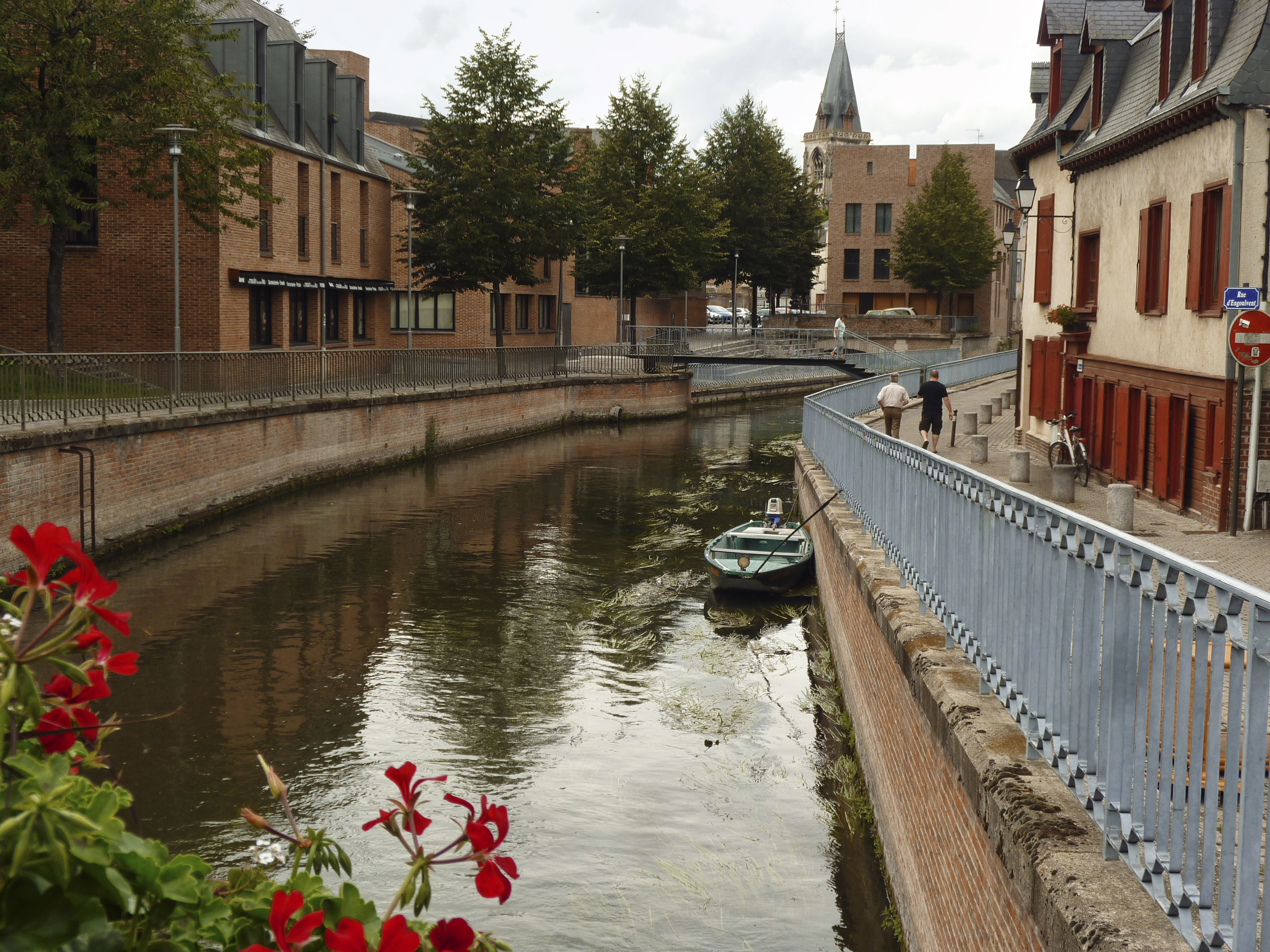
Saint-Leu: Rue d'Engoulvent and Rue des Majots

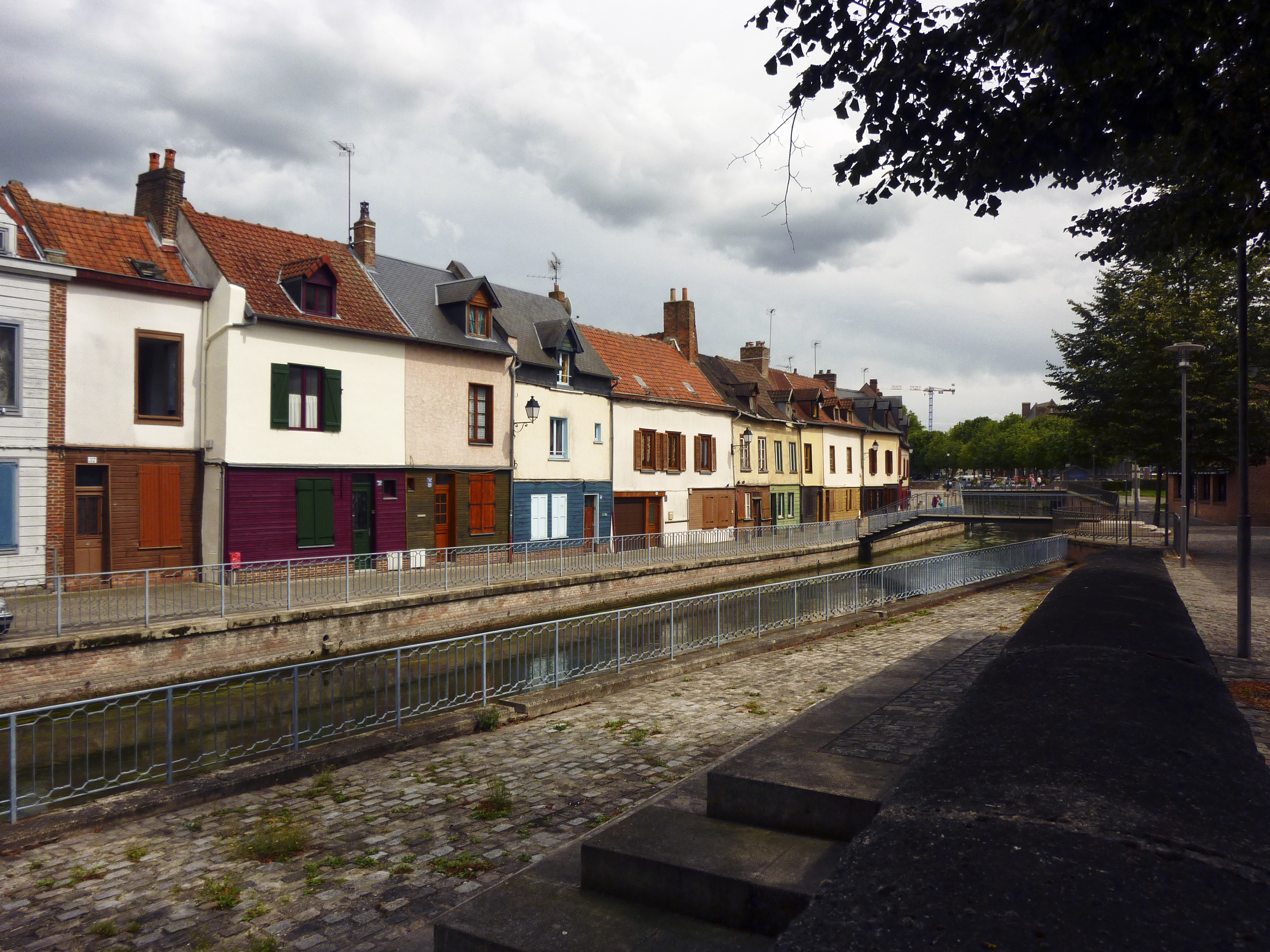
Saint-Leu: Rue d'Engoulvent

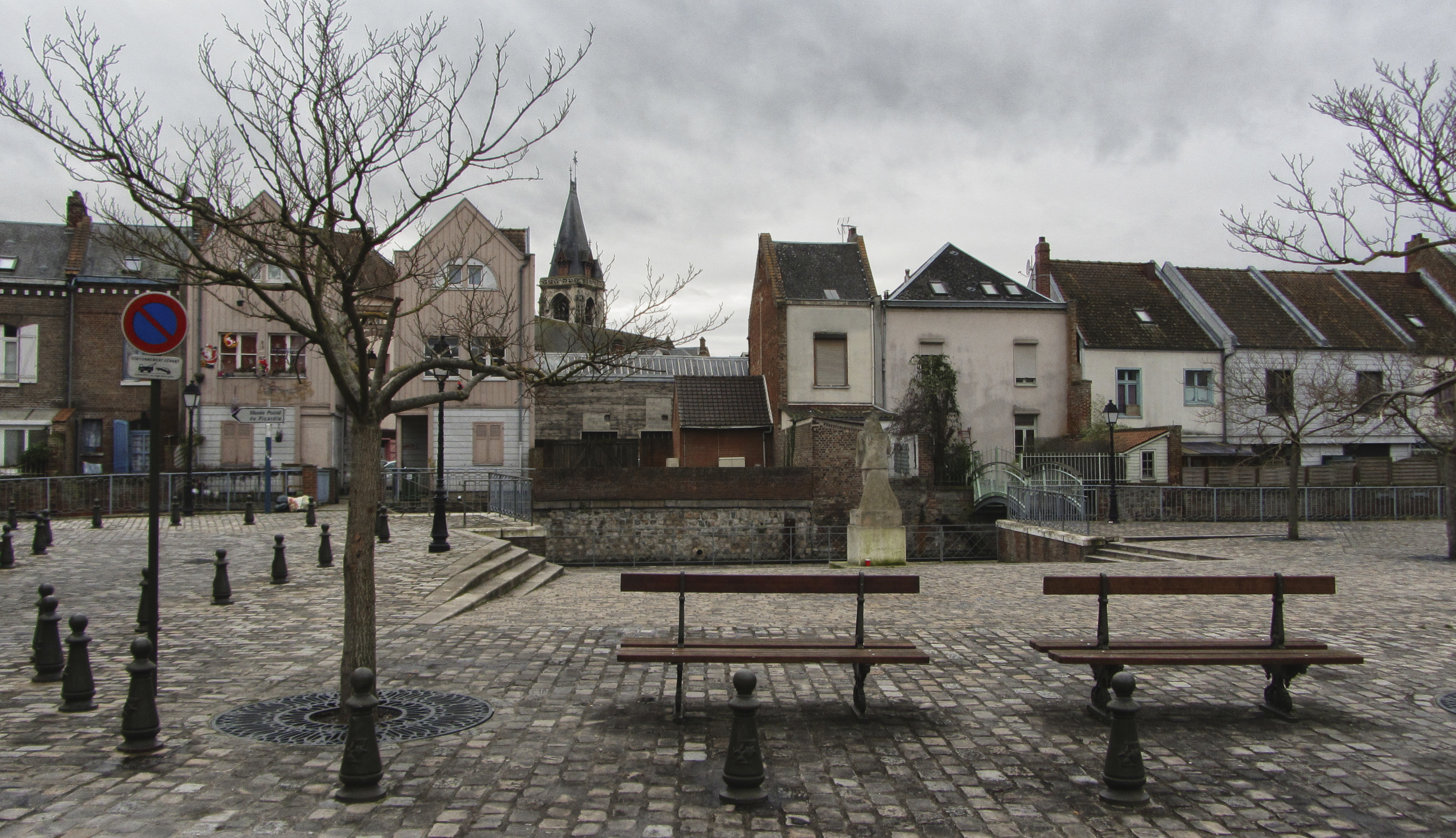
Saint-Leu: Place Aristide Briand

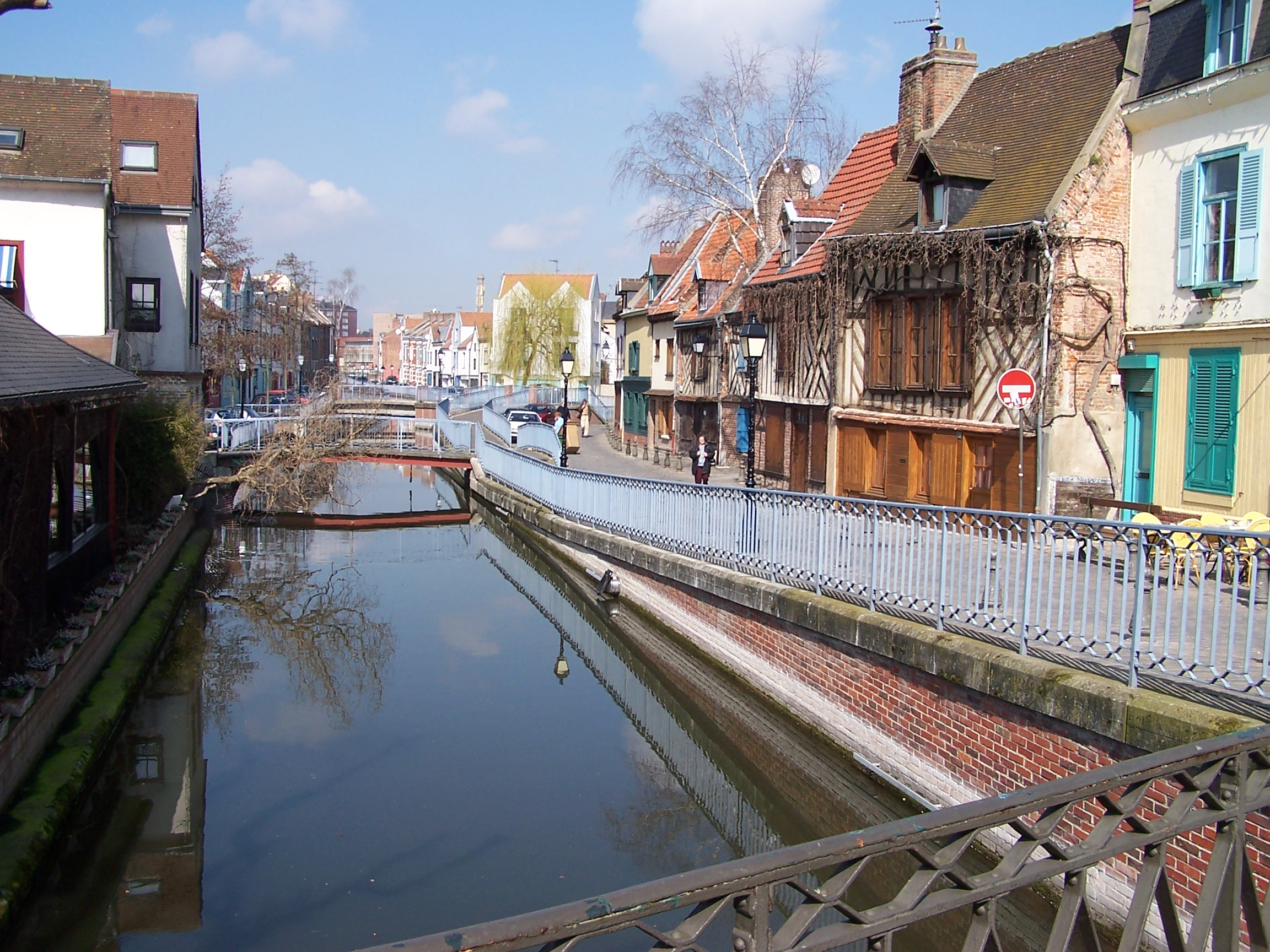
Canal in the Saint-Leu neighborhood

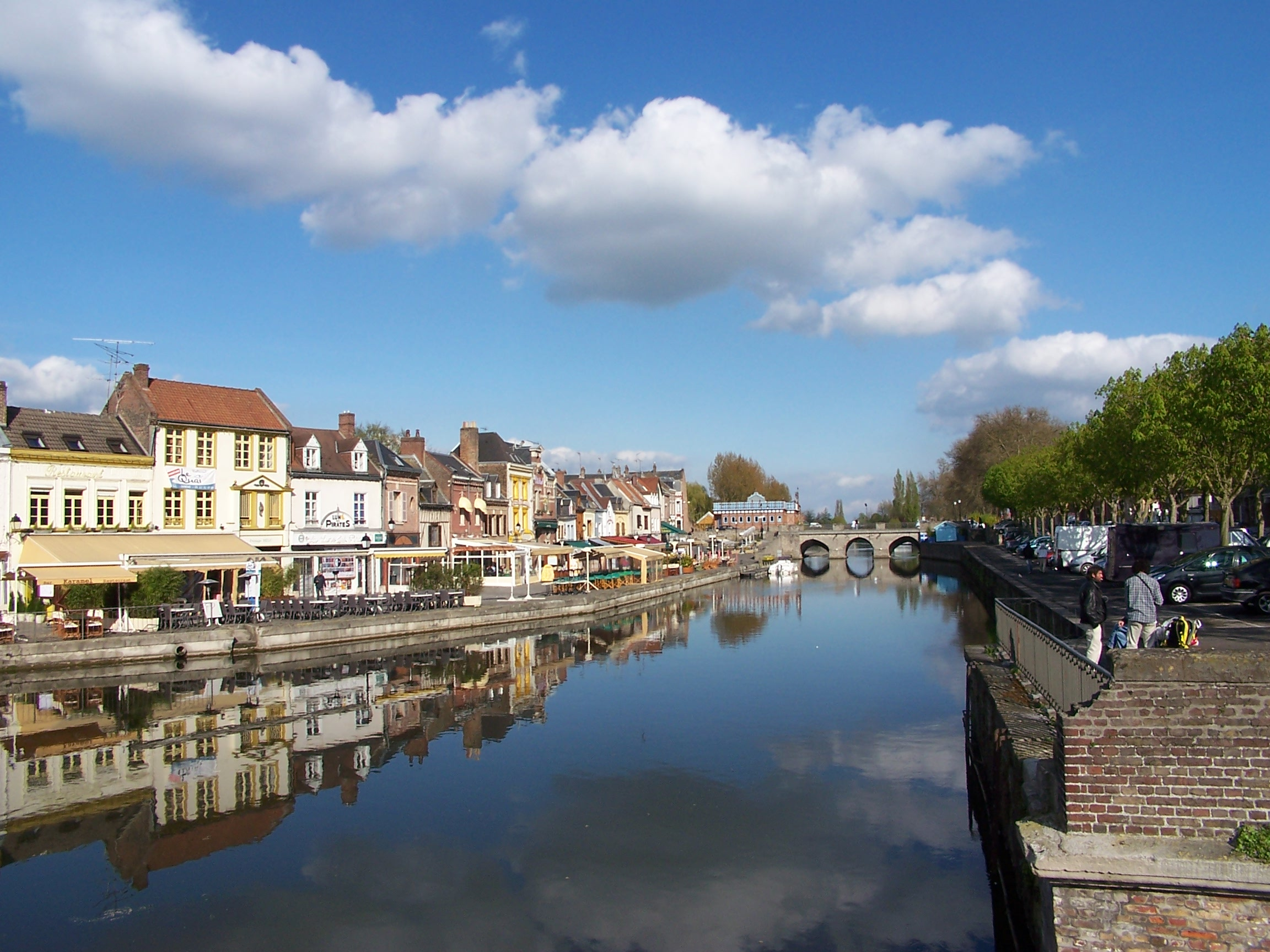
Quai Bélu on the banks of the Somme, near the old market on the waterside

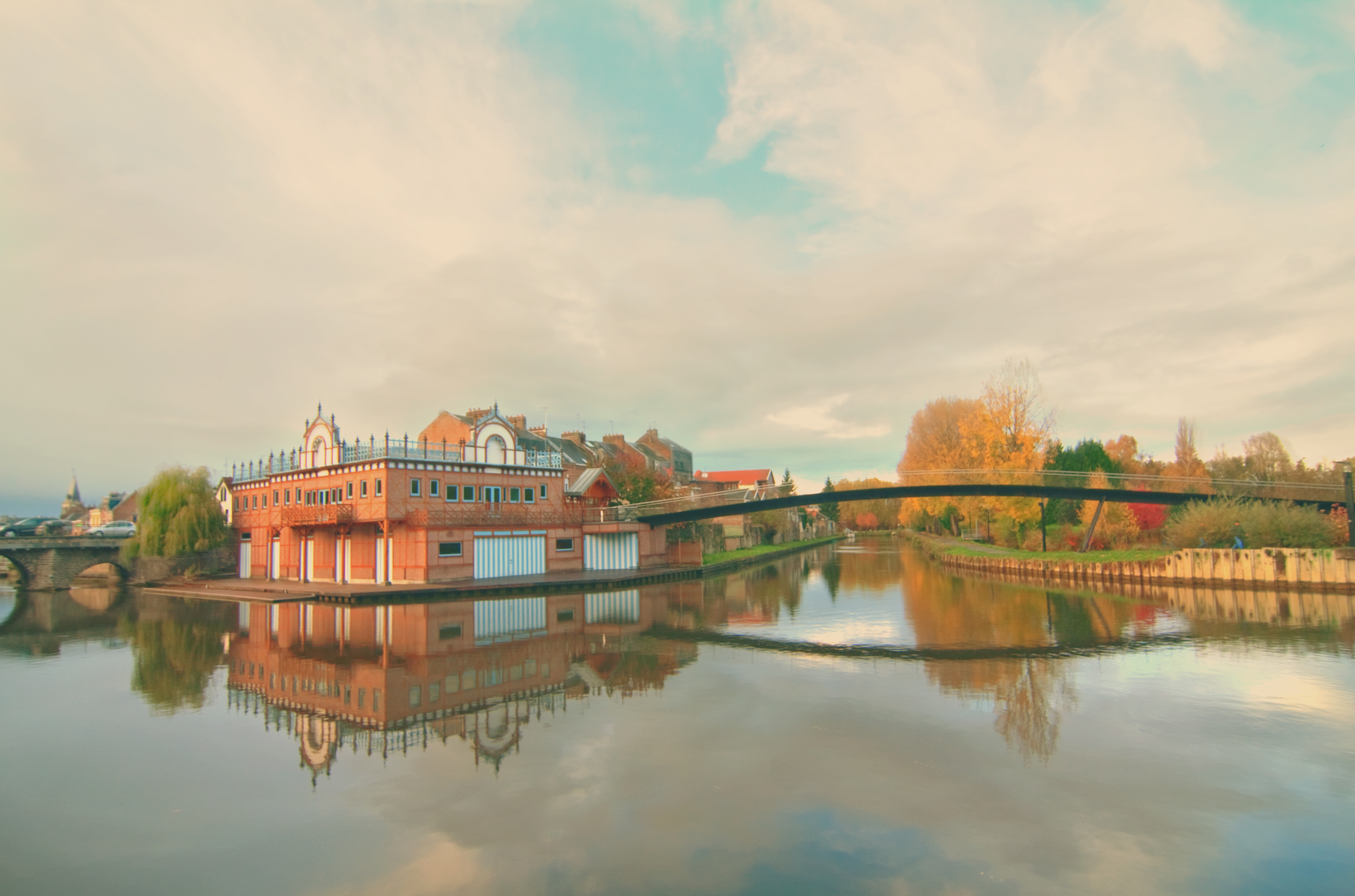
The Samarobriva footbridge from the Sport Nautique d'Amiens to Saint-Pierre Park in 2009

==== Saint-Maurice neighborhood ====
Located to the west of the Citadelle, and east of the La Madeleine Cemetery, this very old working-class neighborhood of Amiens acted as an industrial center in the 18th century. It is currently undergoing significant housing renovation and development.

Bordered by the Canal de la Somme, it offers a stopover for leisure boats, which must go through a lock.

The walls of the city's former dye factory are now those of the École supérieure d'art et de design d'Amiens (ESAD) as well as those of the Faculty of Arts. The École supérieure d'ingénieurs en électronique et électrotechnique (ESIEE) is in the same neighborhood. As the Citadelle, it will be renovated by the architect Renzo Piano to accommodate the university departments (UFR) of: letters, history and geography, languages, the École supérieure du professorat et de l'éducation (ESPE), the House of Languages, the House of Research and the University Library in 2015.

The Jardin des plantes, known as the Jardin du Roy within the city, is also located in this neighborhood.

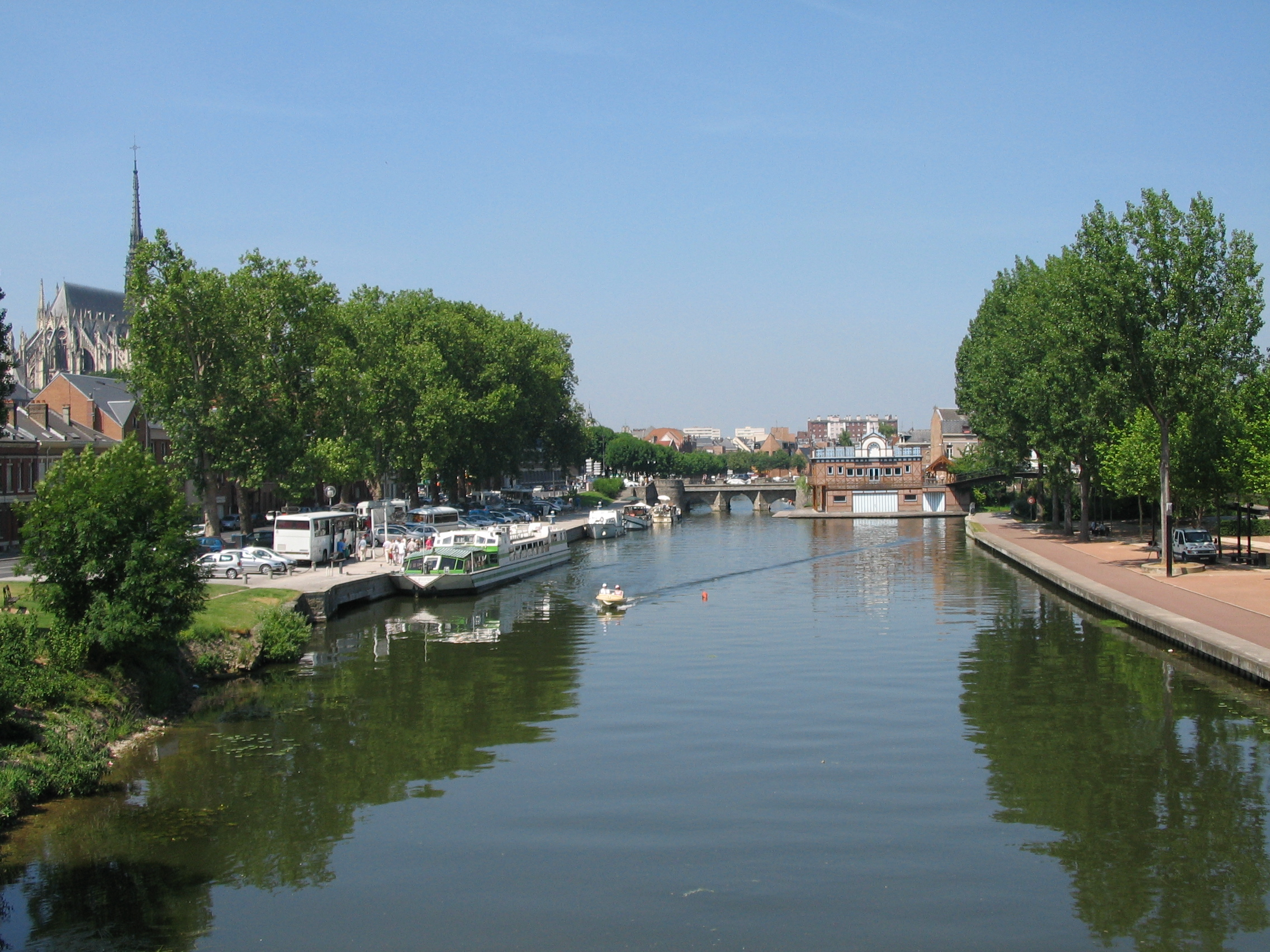
The River Somme from the Boulevard de Beauvillé

==== Henriville neighborhood ====
The Henriville neighborhood was mostly built during the 19th century after the demolition of the city wall. It lies at the south of the town center. It has numerous bourgeois houses and townhouses, predominantly in brick, blending architectural styles of the period, including neoclassical, troubadour and neo-Gothic. There are also private mansions, such as the Acloque mansion and the house of Jules Verne.

==== Saint-Acheul neighborhood ====
The Saint-Acheul neighborhood (IPA: [sɛ̃t‿aʃœl]) existed before Amiens' inception, as people have lived there since prehistoric times. This is where archaeological excavations in the nineteenth century discovered prehistoric tool sets typical of the "Acheulean" prehistorical era, named after this neighborhood (also spelled Acheulian, pronounced [aʃœljɑ̃]). The archaeological garden there is open to the public.

Not to be confused with the commune of Saint-Acheul situated 37 km (23 mi) to the north, the Saint-Acheul neighborhood is the site of a military cemetery from the First World War (1914–1918).

It also contains the Church of Saint-Acheul, the Jesuit former Saint-Acheul College and the former normal school (teacher-training college), which became the Lycée Robert-de-Luzarches. A number of famous people are buried in the former Saint-Acheul cemetery, such as the creator of Bécassine, J.P. Pinchon, and many resistance fighters. Part of the neighborhood includes a so-called English neighborhood, with typical English-style houses. At the foot of this area lie the hortillonnages, a marshy area criss-crossed by canals.

==== Other neighborhoods ====
Amiens, like other big cities, has its large HLM high-rise tower blocks:

- North of the city the neighborhoods du Pigeonnier, which is famous for its weekend market, Messenger, Mozart, Fafet-Brossolette-la Cité, Balzac, and Léo Lagrange-Schweitzer;
- Southeast of the city: Victorine-Autier, Philéas Lebesgue, Condorcet, Pierre-Rollin.
- West: Etouvie and Montières (an ecodistrict is provided in this industrial space, where there are 19th century in brick buildings).
- East: Saint-Acheul-la-Cité and the Clos de l'Avre.

These areas experience a lot of social troubles and have regularly been the place for riots. The northern neighborhoods were the scene of violent events in 1994, 1999 and 2000 (clashes between several districts of the city and between the neighbourhoods of Amiens and the districts of Creil), in 2006 and 2008 (in the wake of incidents in the Paris suburbs) and more recently in August 2012 following a conflict between youth and the police. The cost of the latest vandalism to occur in the north of Amiens would amount, according to Gilles Demailly, to between four and six million euros. These extremely violent riots caused sixteen police officers to be injured.

An extensive programme of redevelopment of these neighborhoods began recently, with demolition of HLM tower blocks and new infrastructure having been built, especially for schools. In 2009, the public transport network of the Amiens agglomeration was significantly modified.

=== Housing ===
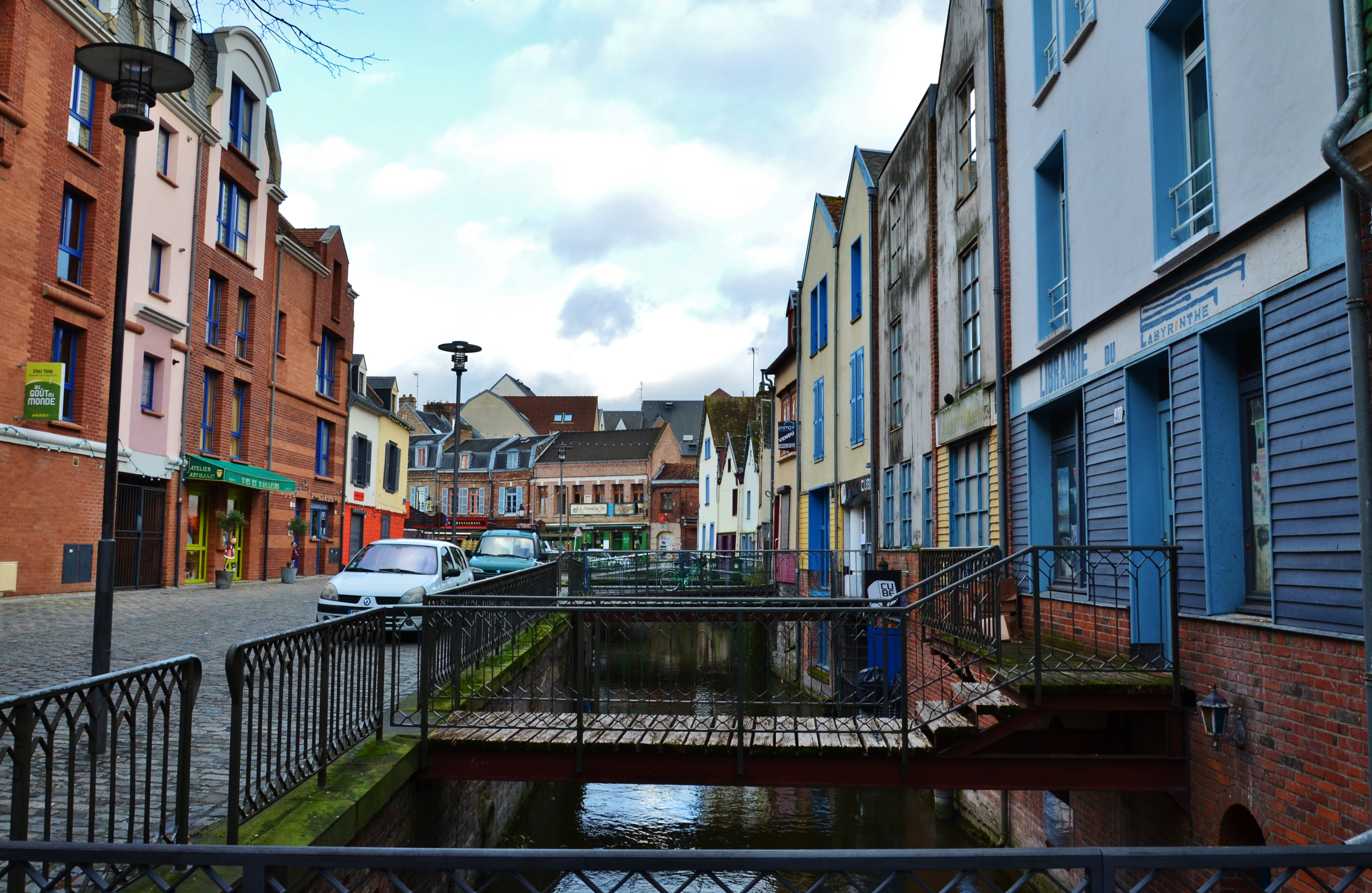
Houses in the Saint-Leu neighborhood.

In 2017, the total number of dwellings in the municipality was 73,541, while it was 63,178 in 1999.

Among this housing, 88.7% were primary residences, 2.1% of secondary residences and 9.2% vacant housing. These dwellings were 35.6% of houses and 63.4% of apartments.

The proportion of principal residences, which were the properties of occupants, was 31.9%, down from 2007 (34.4%). The share of empty rented HLM homes (social housing) was up: 29.8% against 29.4% in 2007, their number increased from 18,268 to 19,431. However, this percentage remains much greater than the rate of 20% required by the Law on Solidarity and Urban Renewal (SRU) for cities and agglomerations of more than 50,000 inhabitants.

The identity of the city is strongly marked by the specificity of its housing stock, consisting in a large proportion of detached houses, semi-detached, single or bourgeois: the amiénoises. These traditional houses in the suburbs, in brick, were intrinsically linked to the expansion of the city during and after the Industrial Revolution.

The amiénoise simple includes a window on the ground floor and floors for attic and basement. It is built on a plot of a few metres wide but is very deep, and includes a garden, forming hearts with green islets and sparse areas. The amiénoise double has two windows at each level. The grandes amiénoises and townhouses rise to at least two floors with large rooms. They can have a gate opening onto a paved courtyard.

The official buildings or mansions regularly use brick façades on a sandstone base, decorated by stone window and door frames.

The Chanoines neighborhood has stone façades exclusively.

In historic areas such as the Saint-Leu neighborhood, façades widely use wood, half-timbered or siding, and wattle and daub.

=== Development projects ===
- Amiens 2030: Amiens, in the context of the Communauté d'agglomération Amiens Métropole, is developing a master development plan called Amiens 2030. This strategic outreach project is centered around the priority issues of economic, social and cultural development of the agglomeration. The whole process of reflection will determine the development of the metropolis by 2030.
- La Citadelle: This flagship project for the agglomeration involves the amalgamation of units of training and research from the University of Picardie in letters, languages, history, geography, philosophy, sociology, psychology and the College teaching and education (ESPE) on the site of La Citadelle. It is to be set on 18 acres (7.3 ha) on the outskirts of downtown. This university construction program is intended to strengthen regional competitiveness and the development of higher education and research. The project, entrusted to the Italian architect Renzo Piano, will be accessible to all inhabitants.
- ZAC Gare-la-Vallée: The project intends to strengthen Amiens in its role as the regional capital and allow the creation of a genuine business district in the heart of the city. With a budget of €157 million, the project combines tertiary activities, shops and a habitat walk from the station and the inner city. The first buildings were inaugurated in 2008. The second phase of development extended from 2012 to 2017. Under the control of the Chief Architect, Paul Chemetov, the project will accommodate 2,000 homes, 200,000 square metres (2,200,000 sq ft) of offices and two urban parks creating a visible link between downtown, the Somme and the hortillonnages.
- ZAC Intercampus: This new housing and services project in the south of the city is projected to host 1,900 dwellings by 2030. A first tranche of 850 dwellings must be delivered in 2015. Located in the immediate vicinity of the campus and the CHU d'Amiens, it will be served by a future TCSP. The ecodistrict of 80 hectares (200 acres) is projected to provide green spaces and gardens, with 60% of its total area to not be built-up. It will include 12 hectares (30 acres) of gardens.
- ZAC Paul Claudel: This new housing and services project of 40 hectares (99 acres) is located at the southern entrance to the city. Intended as a small neighborhood, it must accommodate 1,400 units and 1,800 square metres (19,000 sq ft) of commercial space. Designed in 4 slices, together with its inhabitants, it entered its final phase of development in 2013.
- ZAC Renancourt: This new project must ensure the development of the city to the west. Located between the Grâce Valley, the Selle Valley, the Renancourt neighborhood and its suburb, this planning area is a natural viewpoint over the city. It is also adjacent to emblematic facilities of the city: The Zenith of Amiens, the Stade de la Licorne and the megacity. By 2018, this residential area is projected to accommodate 1,400 houses, a hotel, facilities and shops.
- Bus rapid transit (BRT): A project of three BRT lines is under consideration for commissioning in 2019, at the end of two years of work. Estimated at €85 million excluding taxes, and spanning 44 kilometres (27 mi), the project would include the construction of a new bus depot and four park and ride stops. This project follows the cancellation of a tram project, which was endorsed by the municipal team in place between 2008 and 2014.

== Toponymy ==
The toponym is derived from the name of the local Gallic people, the Ambiani, which in the 4th century, replaced the old name of the town Samarobriva (the bridge on the Samara – Somme). Amiens then became the episcopal headquarters. In Picard, Amiens is called Anmyen.

== Politics and administration ==
=== Municipal administration ===
The Amiens municipal council has 55 elected members.

As a result of the French municipal elections of 2014, the distribution of seats is as follows:

Municipal council of Amiens (2014–2020)
List	Party	President	Seats	Status
Groupe "Rassemblés pour Amiens" (RPA) lit. Group "Gathered for Amiens"	UDI-UMP-MoDem	Brigitte Fouré	42	Majority
Groupe des élus socialistes lit. Group of Socialist elected officials	PS	Didier Cardon	5	Opposition
Groupe Europe Écologie Les Verts lit. Group Europe Ecology – The Greens	EELV	Thomas Hutin and Marion Lepresle (joint presidents)	2	Opposition
Groupe des élus municipaux communistes lit. Group of communist elected officials	PCF	Jacques Lessard	2	Opposition
Groupe Amiens Bleu Marine lit. Group Amiens Navy Blue	FN	Yves Dupille	4	Opposition

=== The cantons ===
Amiens is divided into seven cantons:

Canton	Constituency	Departmental councillors	Party	Population	Cantonal code
Canton of Amiens-1	Fully within the commune of Amiens	Claude Chaidron and Dolorès Esteban	FG	26,762	80 06
Canton of Amiens-2	Formed from a part of Amiens and the communes of Allonville, Bertangles, Cardonnette, Coisy, Montonvillers, Poulainville, Querrieu, Rainneville, Saint-Gratien, Villers-Bocage	Zohra Darras and Francis Lec	DVG – PS	23,827	80 07
Canton of Amiens-3	Formed from a part of Amiens and the communes of Aubigny, Bussy-lès-Daours, Camon, Daours, Lamotte-Brebière, Rivery, Vecquemont	Marion Lepresle and Jean-Claude Renaux	EELV -PCF	27,020	80 08
Canton of Amiens-4	Formed from a part of Amiens and the communes of Blangy-Tronville, Cachy, Gentelles, Glisy, Longueau, Villers-Bretonneux	Nathalie Marchand and Jean-Louis Piot	PCF – PS	24,853	80 09
Canton of Amiens-5	Formed from a part of Amiens and the communes of Boves, Cagny	Philippe Casier and Blandine Denis	PS – EELV	24,535	80 10
Canton of Amiens-6	Formed from a part of Amiens and the communes of Dury, Hébécourt, Rumigny, Sains-en-Amiénois, Saint-Fuscien	Hubert de Jenlis and France Fongueuse	UDI	25,969	80 11
Canton of Amiens-7	Formed from a part of Amiens and the communes of Pont-de-Metz, Saleux, Salouël, Vers-sur-Selles	Margaux Delétré and Olivier Jardé	UMP – UDI	27,188	80 12

=== Deputies ===
Amiens is divided into two legislative districts (as of the 2022 elections):

- Somme's 1st constituency (including Amiens II North-West, Amiens IV East, Amiens VIII North): François Ruffin (Picardie Debout, NUPES)
- Somme's 2nd constituency (including Amiens I West, Amiens III North-East, Amiens V South-East, Amiens VII South-West, Amiens VI South): Barbara Pompili (RE)

=== List of mayors ===
On 4 April 2014, Brigitte Fouré (IDU (NC)) succeeded Gilles Demailly (PS) as mayor of Amiens. Her list was elected in the second round on 30 March 2014 with 50.39% of the votes.

Mayors of Amiens since 1944
Start	End	Name	Party	Other details
24 September 1944	27 May 1950	Maurice Vast	SFIO	Industrialist, he ran the oils and fats business of "Igol". Mayor from 24 September 1944. Resigned on 27 May 1950. Councillor acting as Mayor until 7 June 1950.
7 June 1950	7 July 1950			Following the resignation of Maurice Vast, who was outvoted, the city was administered by a special delegation led by Eugène Jolibois.
7 July 1950	7 May 1953	Maurice Vast	SFIO	
7 May 1953	22 March 1959	Camille Goret	SFIO	Lawyer
22 March 1959	28 March 1971	Maurice Vast	SFIO then DVG allied to the UNR	
28 March 1971	24 March 1989	René Lamps	PCF	Teacher and Professor of general education of college
24 March 1989	27 June 2002	Gilles de Robien	UDF-PR then UDF	Insurance broker and loan officer. Resigned in 2002 to join the Government.
27 June 2002	29 March 2007	Brigitte Fouré	UDF	Maître de conférence in private law. Resigned on the return of Gilles de Robien.
29 March 2007	21 March 2008	Gilles de Robien	UDF then NC	
21 March 2008	4 April 2014	Gilles Demailly	PS	Researcher and teacher, specialist in the chemistry of sugars
1 April 2015	October 2024	Brigitte Fouré	UDI (NC)	
October 2024	March 2026	Hubert de Jenlis	DVC	
March 2026	in progress	Frédéric Fauvet	PS	

=== Judicial and administrative authorities ===
Amiens is a city marked by a strong judicial tradition, with the historical presence of its Court of Appeal, the Cour d'appel d'Amiens, as well as all courts of first and second degree of judicial order. The Court of Appeal of Amiens has jurisdiction over the three departments of Picardy, with nine high courts.

More recently, Amiens has become the seat of:

- The national court of disability and the pricing of insurance for work accidents.
- An administrative tribunal whose rulings may be appealed to the administrative court of appeal of Douai.
- The Regional Chamber of Auditors of Picardy.

== Twin towns – sister cities ==
Amiens is twinned with:

- Dortmund, Germany (1960)
- Görlitz, Germany (1971)
- Darlington, England, United Kingdom (1973)
- Tulsa, United States (2006)

Amiens also has friendly relations with Mianyang in China and Amiens in Australia.

== Population and society ==
=== Demography ===
The inhabitants of Amiens are called the Amiénois and their blason populaire is Chés maqueux d'gueugues (the eaters of nuts).

The population of Amiens has risen sharply since the mid-19th century: Its population doubled between 1850 and 1960, from 50,000 to 100,000 inhabitants, i.e. a gain of 50,000 people over this period of 110 years, and gaining about 30,000 others since (over 50 years only this time).

==== Demographic evolution ====
Historical population

Year	Pop.	±% p.a.
1793	40,000	—
1800	41,279	+0.45%
1806	39,853	−0.58%
1821	41,107	+0.21%
1831	45,001	+0.91%
1836	46,129	+0.50%
1841	47,117	+0.42%
1846	49,591	+1.03%
1851	52,149	+1.01%
1856	56,587	+1.65%
1861	58,780	+0.76%
1866	61,063	+0.77%
1872	63,747	+0.72%

Year	Pop.	±% p.a.
1876	66,896	+1.21%
1881	74,170	+2.09%
1886	80,288	+1.60%
1891	83,654	+0.82%
1896	88,731	+1.19%
1901	90,758	+0.45%
1906	90,920	+0.04%
1911	93,207	+0.50%
1921	92,780	−0.05%
1926	91,576	−0.26%
1931	90,211	−0.30%
1936	93,773	+0.78%
1946	84,761	−1.01%

Year	Pop.	±% p.a.
1954	92,506	+1.10%
1962	105,433	+1.65%
1968	117,888	+1.88%
1975	131,476	+1.57%
1982	131,332	−0.02%
1990	131,872	+0.05%
1999	135,501	+0.30%
2007	134,737	−0.07%
2012	132,727	−0.30%
2017	134,057	+0.20%
2023	136,449	+0.30%

From 1962 to 1999: Population without double counting; for the years following: municipal population.
Source: Ldh/EHESS/Cassini until 1999 and INSEE (1968-2023)

==== Age structure ====
Amiens is distinguished by the youthfulness of its population. Notably the age group 15-24 is much larger (21.2%) than the average of the Somme department (13.2%).

Population by age of Amiens, 2023 (%)

80+	4.5
65–79	11.7
55–64	9.6
40–54	16.7
25–39	20.1
15–24	21.2
0–14	16.1

Total: 99.9

male

female

Source: INSEE

Population by age of Somme, 2023 (%)

90+	5.7
75–89	15.9
60–74	12.9
45–59	18.9
30–44	17.1
15–29	13.2
0–14	16.6

Total: 100.3

male

female

Source: INSEE

=== Education ===
==== Primary and secondary education ====
Educational institutions of the city fall under the supervision of the Academy of Amiens which develops curriculum according to the Inspection académique la Somme.

On 1 September 2010, 10,658 children were enrolled in the Amiens public schools: 4,341 in nursery school and 6,317 in elementary school.

In 2011, the Amiens agglomeration included 46 nursery schools, six elementary schools and 54 primary schools including eleven private. It had nine public colleges and six private colleges. Amiens has 24 schools:

- Vocational high schools: Acheuléen, Édouard-Branly, Edouard-Gand, La Providence (private), Montaigne, Romain Rolland, Sacré-Cœur (private), Saint-Martin (private), Saint-Rémi (private) and Saint-Riquier (private).
- General and technological high schools: Robert de Luzarches, La Hotoie, Jean Baptiste Delambre, La Providence (private), Sacré-Cœur (private), Saint-Martin (private), Saint-Rémi (private), Saint-Riquier (private) and Sainte-Famille (private).
- General secondary schools: Louis Thuillier, Madeleine Michelis (former high school for girls, established in 1883 by Marie Hugonin, wife of Charles Eugène Bertrand, mother of Paul Bertrand and niece of Bishop Flavien-Abel-Antoine Hugonin, Bishop of Bayeux and Lisieux – the inaugural speech was delivered by Jules Verne.)
- Technological lycées: Édouard-Branly, Édouard-Gand.

==== Higher education ====
The Amiens metropole welcomes one of the largest student populations in France. In 2013, the city had 26,000 students (3,300 in short-term) and 800 researchers who are divided into some 40 institutions of higher education, 32 laboratories, and 10 units associated with the National Scientific Research Centre or the French Institute of Health and Medical Research.

- The University of Picardie Jules Verne (UPJV) is headquartered in Amiens and has a broad range of courses:
  - Faculty of Medicine and Pharmacy
  - Faculty of Law, Politics and Economics
  - Faculty of Sciences
  - IUP MIAGE (computing in companies)
  - Faculty of Human Sciences, Literature, Languages, Sport Sciences
  - IUT (Institut Universitaire Technique) of Management, Administration, Computing, Mechanical Engineering, Biological Engineering, Commercial Management.
  - Faculty of Arts
- Preparatory courses for sciences, economics, biology schools and others
- ESIEE (Engineering School of Electronics and Electrical Technology)
- Business school
- ESC Amiens (Business school)
- ESAD (School of Art and Design)
- Brevet de technicien supérieur (advanced vocational diploma) in audio-visual methods
- School of Nursing
- Midwifery college
- Physiotherapy and Massage School
- Teacher training college

=== Health ===
The Centre Hospitalier Universitaire (CHU) or, Centre Hospitalier Universitaire of Amiens Picardie, is organized around four sites:

- South Hospital, Avenue René-Laënnec
- North Hospital, Place Victor-Pauchet
- Saint-Victor Centre, 354 Bis Boulevard de Beauville
- Obstetrics and Gynaecology Centre, 124 Rue Camille-Desmoulins

Since 2014, the four sites have been gradually gathered on the current site of the South Hospital, with the exception of the long stay units for the elderly remaining in the Saint-Victor Centre. This merger will be completed in 2016 and allow the CHU of Amiens to increase its national and inter-regional dimension. This group represents the largest hospital construction of France and one of the most important in Europe with more than €630 million for work and equipment. At the end of the work, the total space of the CHU of Amiens will be 172,000 square metres (1,850,000 sq ft). It will total three blocks of hospitals with 400 beds each. The CHU of Amiens is the largest employer in the Picardy region. At the end of the merger, there will be 6,700 employees, 1,300 students of the health professions, and 1,250 consultants who will go there each day.

In order to maintain the availability of health units to the north of the city, a health center will open its doors in the first quarter of 2016, at the crossroads of the Avenue de l'Europe and the Rue Maurice-Ravel. This health space of 1,200 square metres (13,000 sq ft) will host general practitioners and specialists of the CHU such as: cardiologist, a service of gynaecology-obstetrics, psychologists, dentist, and masseurs-physiotherapists. There is a promise of a permanence of care, 7 days a week and 24 hours a day.

Alongside the CHU, there are three private clinics, resulting from the consolidation of old clinics in the city. These care and hospitalisation institutions for medical, surgical, and obstetrics came together to create a private hospital center in the Vallée des Vignes neighborhood, south of the city.

- Polyclinic of Picardy, 43 Rue Alexandre Dumas
- Clinic of Europe, 5 Allée des Pays-Bas
- Victor Pauchet Heath Group, 2 Avenue Irlande

The CHU of Amiens figured in 11th place in the 2013 awards of the hospitals and clinics of the magazine Le Point. In this ranking, the CHU stands out for ankle surgery (3rd), hip prosthesis (5th), foot surgery (7th) and paediatrics (14th). In this same classification, the Victor Palmer Health Group, equipped with a solid "mother-to-child hub", gained a 5th place in the table for the gynaecological clinics and an 8th place for breast cancers.

In 2005, the CHU of Amiens became of international renown thanks to Professor Bernard Devauchelle, a native of the city, where his team performed the first partial face transplant in the world.

=== Sport ===
Thanks to a large proportion of youth in its population and the dynamism and the success of its sports clubs, Amiens has been awarded the title of "Sportiest city of France" by the L'Équipe newspaper in 1999. The city had already won the title in 1969. In 2013, Amiens Métropole had nearly 300 sports associations and Sports Recreation: approximately 150 associations are grouped within the Office of Amiens Metropole Sports and 150 others are referenced without being adherents. According to this same Office for Sports, Amiens has 25,000 members of sports clubs, excluding school and university members.

- American football

The Amiens Spartiates, operating in the top-level Ligue Élite de Football Américain, have been champions of France in 2004, 2010 and 2012. Created in 1987, the club has more than 400 licensees.

- Archery

The Compagnie d'Arc d'Amiens is an archery club founded on 14 November 1803.

- Athletics

AUC Athlétisme is a multidisciplinary athletic club which particularly developed Stella Akakpo, specialist of the sprint and the relay. Bertrand Moulinet specialist of the 20 km and 50 km walk.

- Badminton

The AUC Badminton (Amiens University Badminton Club) was founded in 1986. Labeled "French school of badminton" by the French Badminton Federation, the club had 205 members in 2014. The city hosted the French National Badminton Championships in 2011.

- Ballon au poing

Each 15 August at the Parc de la Hotoie, Amiens receives the final stages of Ballon au poing.

- Fencing

The Circle of Fencing of Amiens Métropole is one of the oldest French clubs. It was succeeded in the Hall of arms of Amiens opened in 1886. The circle has approximately 150 members and remains a major club of French fencing with many qualifications and results at the French Fencing Championships. The club held the Elite French Championships in 2001 and 2011.

- Field hockey

The Amiens Sports Club, currently playing in League Elite D1), were men's champions of France in 1981, 1982, 1986, 1987, 1988, 1989 and women's champions France in 1983, 1984, 1993, and 1995.

- Floorball

The Hoplites d'Ambiani, D1. A second team is evolving in D2.

- Football

The main club in the city is Amiens SC. The team was finalist of the Coupe de France in 2001 and reached semifinals in 1930 and 2008, and played top-division Ligue 1 last time in 2020. Its associated women's team is CS Amiens Club. Before the 2012–2013 season, the team was known under the name of CS Amiens Montieres Etouvie.

AC Amiens is the second biggest club in the city, currently playing in semi-professional Championnat National level.

- Golf

The Golf Club D'amiens was founded in 1924. The men's team plays in D1, women team in D2. The club has 530 members in 2013.

- Handball

The Amiens Picardie Hand (APH), currently playing in National 2 (D4). The club, a result of the merger of several Amiens clubs, was created in 1991.

- Ice hockey

The Gothiques d'Amiens, currently playing in Ligue Magnus (D1), were champions of France in 1999 and 2004, and runners-up in France for 1989, 1997, 1998, 2003 and 2006. The team plays at the Coliséum on the largest area of permanent ice in France (3800 seats). Amiens hosted Division I of the 2006 Ice Hockey World Championships.

- Longue paume

Amiens won the Championship of France in 6/6, 10 times.

- Roller in-line hockey

The Écureuils d'Amiens, Elite League (D1), were the runners-up of France in 2010, finalists of the Coupe de France in 2007 and finalists of the European Cup of clubs in 2008.

- Rowing

The Sport Nautique d'Amiens (SNA) was founded in 1866. Located on the edge of the Parc Saint-Pierre, it is labeled "French rowing school 3 stars" by the French Federation of rowing. With 465 members in 2013, the club currently competes in the 2nd division.

- Rugby union

The Rugby Club Amiénois (RCA) was founded in 1900. The men's first team plays in Fédérale 3.

- Swimming

The Amiens Métropole swim team, is that of Jérémy Stravius, who was a triple world champion of swimming and Olympic champion in the 4 × 100 m relay. The club hosted the French Youth Championships in 2012 at the Coliséum

- Table tennis

The Amiens Sport Table Tennis (ASTT) was founded in 1945. It was twice crowned champion of France in 1968 and 1969. The men's first team also won the Coupe de France in 1966 and 1967.

- Tennis

Amiens Athletic Club (AAC) was founded in 1904. It is one of the 10 biggest clubs in France with almost 1,000 members in 2013.

- Volleyball

The Amiens Longueau Métropole Volley-Ball (ALMVB) including women's first team plays in Women's Elite Division (D2) and the Amiens Métropole Volley-Ball (AMVB). The men's first team plays in Nationale 1 (D3).

Stade de la Licorne

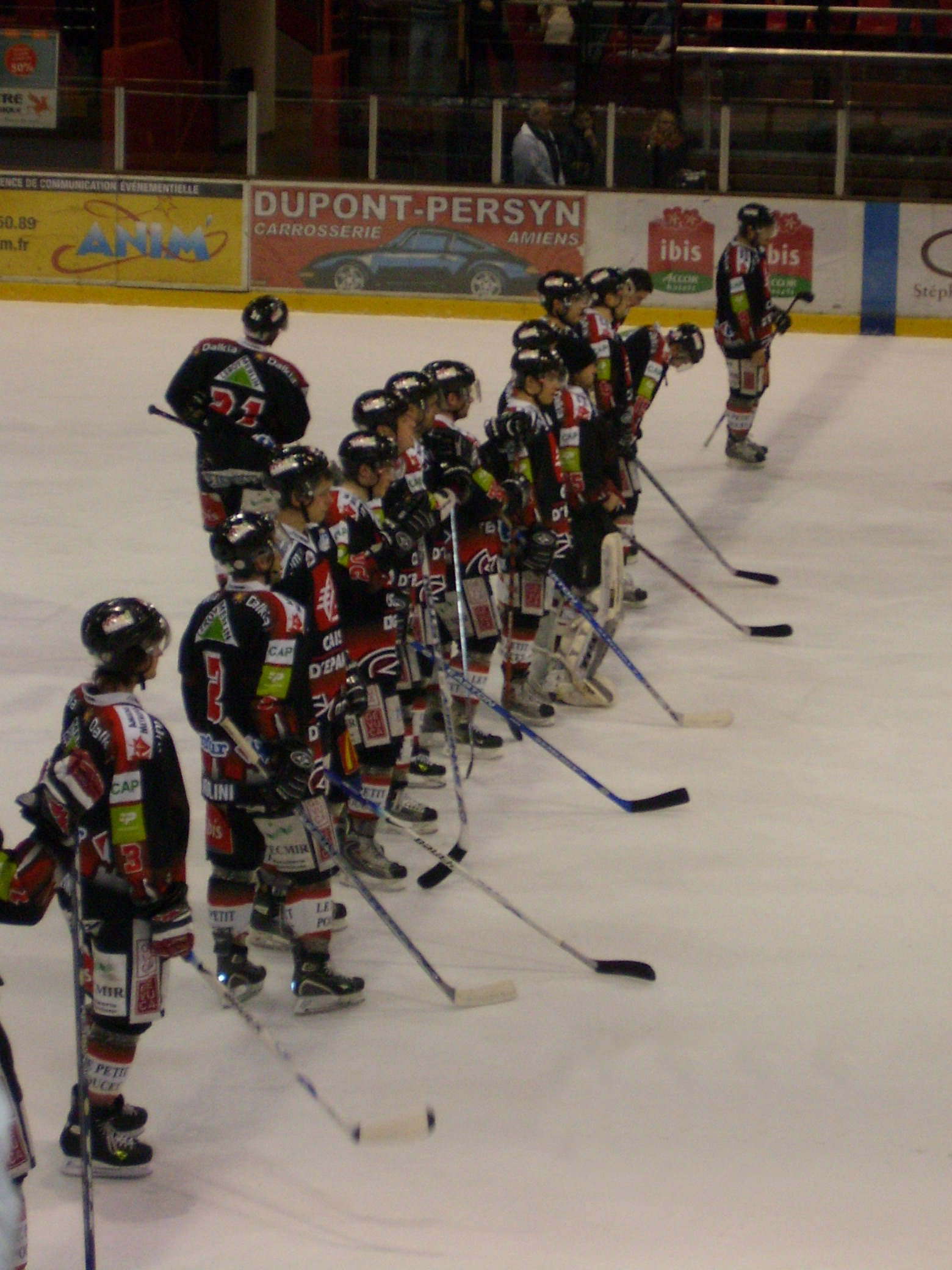
The Gothiques d'Amiens in 2008

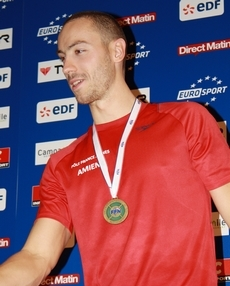
Jérémy Stravius, member of the Amiens Métropole Natation club

Since the start of the Tour de France in 1903, Amiens has hosted the start of a stage on ten occasions (1932, 1962, 1964, 1967, 1970, 1971, 1975, 1979, 1999, 2004) and the stage finish ten times (1932, 1962, 1964, 1967, 1970, 1971, 1975, 1993, 1999, 2015). Amiens hosted the finish of Stage 8 of the 2018 Tour de France.

On 29 April 2006, Amiens hosted the French Federation of ice hockey created during the World Cup of Ice Hockey of Group B (antechamber of the world elite) organised in Amiens at the same time. It is now installed at Issy-les-Moulineaux.

Each 15 August at the Parc de la Hotoie, the city receives the final stages of the Picardy sports and in particular those of the most emblematic, traditional Picard sport: The Ballon au poing. This Picard game is played by teams of six. To be able to hit the ball, players surround their hand and their wrist with a strip of canvas or leather.

From August 29 to September 1, 2012, the Compagnie d'Arc d'Amiens organizes the French FITA Archery Championships at the Hippodrome du petit Saint-Jean.

=== Media ===
==== Newspapers and news magazines ====
- Le Courrier picard, the principal regional newspaper was founded in 1944. Its headquarters are located at 29 Rue de la République (it sold 64,587 copies in 2013).
- Fakir, an independent journal was founded in Amiens in 1999 by François Ruffin.
- Le Télescope d'Amiens, pure player of local information, was in publication from September 2012 to April 2014.

Free newspapers Metro and 20 minutes are distributed in the city, including in Amiens railway station.

Since 7 February 1996, the Communauté d'agglomération Amiens Métropole distributes a free weekly local newspaper: JDA (Journal des Amiénois). This publication, which appears every Wednesday, is distributed to all homes in the metropolitan area and is made available in public places (taken at about 95,000 copies) as well as on the internet site of the city in its digital version. Over time, the journal has evolved through various forms. Carried out by the Directorate of communication of Amiens Métropole, the latest form dates to 16 January 2015. In addition to the JDA which is attached to information on the whole of the territory of Amiens Métropole, the city has also had monthly publications specific to the city, which no longer exist today: Amiensville then Amiens Forum (from April 2009 to June 2014).

The people of Amiens have other sources of information on their territory, such as the monthly publication of the Regional Council of Picardy, Agir en Picardie. The Departmental Council of the Somme also sees its magazine distributed each month to the samariens homes, Vivre en Somme. Since 2006, the regional tourism committee of Picardy publishes Esprit de Picardie, a travel magazine on the Picardy region, every six months.

Several associative journals and specialised magazines are also distributed free of charge in public places: L'Écho des Amphis (student monthly), Bon Temps (quarterly magazine dedicated to the culture of Amiens and the art of living), Style & Co Amiens (deco magazine, trends and lifestyle), Night Clubbing Magazine (magazine of the nightlife in Amiens), Picardie la Gazette (economics weekly), Entreprises 80 (monthly of the Chamber of commerce and industry of Amiens-Picardie).

==== Audiovisual ====
===== Television channels =====
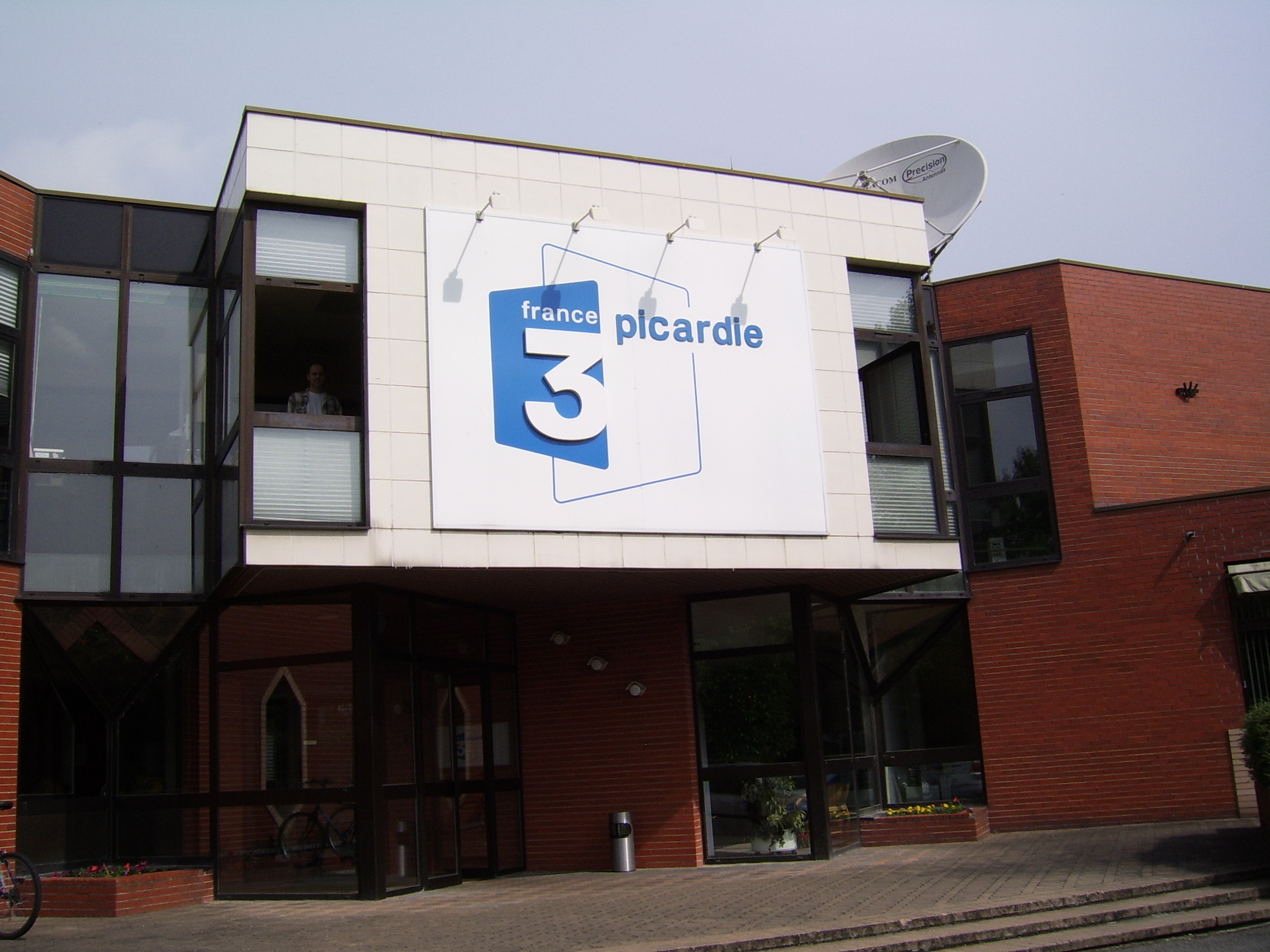
The headquarters of France 3 Picardie

- The headquarters of France 3 Picardie, the channel that broadcasts Picardie Matin - Picardy Morning among other programming, is located on Rue Roger Martin du Gard, to the north of the city.
- Canal Nord, a local channel created in the mid-1980s in the northern districts, is now extended to the entire city via the Wibox network;
- Wéo Picardie, (broadcast suspended since 8 January 2014).
- TV Amiens, a local television channel on the internet.
- WebTV Picardie, an internet television channel of the Regional Council of Picardy.

===== FM radio stations =====
Most of the national radio stations broadcast their programs in the Amiens area and can be added to France Bleu Picardie (100.2 MHz) and local stations Radio Campus Amiens (87.7 MHz) and Radio Galaxie programme Évasion (97.7 MHz).

FM radio stations broadcast to Amiens, as of 27 February 2015
Frequency	Station	RDS	Transmitter	Power
87.7 MHz	Radio Campus Amiens	CAMPUS	Amiens/Campus	500W
88.4 MHz	Radio Nova	NOVA	Amiens/Dury Towercast	1 kW
89.3 MHz	France Musique	MUSIQUE	Amiens/Dury Towercast	2 kW
90 MHz	Radio Métropolys	METRO	Amiens/Dury 3	500W
91 MHz	Mouv'	MOUV'	Amiens/Dury TDF	1 kW
91.4 MHz	Rire & Chansons	RIRE &	Amiens/Dury Towercast	1 kW
91.8 MHz	Fun Radio	F U N	Amiens/Dury TDF	1 kW
92.2 MHz	Nostalgie	NOSTALGI	Amiens/Dury Towercast	1 kW
92.6 MHz	France Inter	INTER	Amiens/Dury Towercast	2 kW
93.6 MHz	Virgin Radio (Amiens)	VIRGIN	Amiens/Dury TDF	1 kW
94.2 MHz	Contact	CONTACT	Amiens/Dury Towercast	1 kW
95.4 MHz	France Inter	INTER	Amiens/Saint-Just TDF	20 kW
96.3 MHz	Radio FG	RADIO FG	Amiens/Dury Towercast	1 kW
97 MHz	France Culture	CULTURE	Amiens/Dury Towercast	2 kW
97.7 MHz	Radio Galaxie programme Évasion	EVASION	Amiens/Dury TDF	500W
98.4 MHz	Skyrock (Amiens)	SKYROCK	Amiens/Dury Towercast	1 kW
99 MHz	NRJ (Amiens-Abbeville)	NRJ	Amiens/Dury Towercast	1 kW
99.4 MHz	France Musique	MUSIQUE	Amiens/Saint-Just TDF	20 kW
99.8 MHz	TSF Jazz	TSF JAZZ	Amiens/Dury Towercast	400W
100.2 MHz	France Bleu Picardie	BLEU.PIC	Amiens/Dury Towercast	2 kW
101 MHz	Chérie FM (Amiens-Abbeville)	CHERIEFM	Amiens/Dury Towercast	1 kW
101.4 MHz	Radio Classique	CLASSIQ	Amiens/Dury TDF	1 kW
102.5 MHz	France Culture	CULTURE	Amiens/Saint-Just TDF	20 kW
103.2 MHz	RTL2	RTL2	Amiens/Dury TDF	1 kW
104.3 MHz	RTL	RTL	Amiens/Dury Towercast	1 kW
104.7 MHz	Europe 1	EUROPE 1	Amiens/Dury Towercast	1 kW
105.5 MHz	France Info	INFO	Amiens/Dury Towercast	1 kW
106.1 MHz	France Maghreb 2	FMAGHREB	Amiens/Dury TDF	1 kW
107.3 MHz	RMC	RMC INFO	Amiens/Dury TDF	500W
107.7 MHz	Sanef 107.7	107.7 FM	Péage d'Argœuves	200W
107.7 MHz	Sanef 107.7	107.7 FM	Péage de Dury	200W
107.7 MHz	Sanef 107.7	107.7 FM	Guignemicourt/Le Poirier	200W
107.7 MHz	Sanef 107.7	107.7 FM	Péage de Glisy	200W
107.7 MHz	Sanef 107.7	107.7 FM	Péage de Saleux	200W

===== Digital terrestrial radio stations =====
As of 1 March 2015, the CSA has not selected Amiens for broadcast or experimentation of this broadcasting standard.

==== Telecommunications ====
The city of Amiens is covered for:

- Cable by Wibox/Cityplay since 2002.
- Fibre optic by Wibox/Cityplay since 2007 and by Orange since 2013.
- ADSL, with five telephone exchanges, the majority of which are unbundled, by SFR, Free, Bouygues Telecom and Completel.

=== Houses of worship ===
==== Buddhist ====
The Zen Sōtō Zen centre affiliated with the international Zen Association, on Rue Vulfran Warmé.

==== Catholic ====
- Notre-Dame Cathedral, Place Notre-Dame
- Chapelle du Bon Pasteur (first of the name): Situated on Rue Daire, it belonged to the Conseil général de la Somme. Leased to the Society of St. Pius X from 1983 to 2007, it was sold, with the property complex to which it belonged, to Picardy in May 2007.
- Chapelle Saint-Vincent-de-Paul, situated on Rue Jules Barni, the offices are run by the Society of St. Pius X according to the Tridentine Mass (an extraordinary form the Roman rite).
- The church of Saint Honoré known as the église de Beauvais, Rue Dom Bouquet
- The church of Saint-Acheul, Chaussée Jules Ferry
- The church of Saint-Firmin-le-Martyr, 137 Rue du Faubourg du Hem
- The church of Saint-Germain-l'Écossais, Rue Pingre
- The church of Sacré-Cœur, Rue de Mareuil
- The church of Saint-Jacques, Rue Saint-Jacques
- The church of Saint-Leu, Rue Saint-Leu
- The church of Saint-Martin, Rue Morgan
- The church of Saint-Maurice, Rue Turgot
- The church of Saint-Pierre, Rue St Pierre
- The church of Saint-Rémi, Rue des Cordeliers
- The church of Saint-Roch, Rue de l'Abbaye
- The church of Sainte-Anne, Rue Vulfran Warmé
- The church of Sainte-Jeanne-d'Arc, Route de Rouen
- The church of Saint-Paul, Rue de l'Île-de-France
- The church of Saint-Pierre in the Montières neighborhood
- The church of Sainte-Marie-Madeleine in the Renancourt neighborhood
- The church of Sainte-Thérèse, Avenue de la Paix
- The church of the Immaculate Heart of Mary, Rue de Cagny
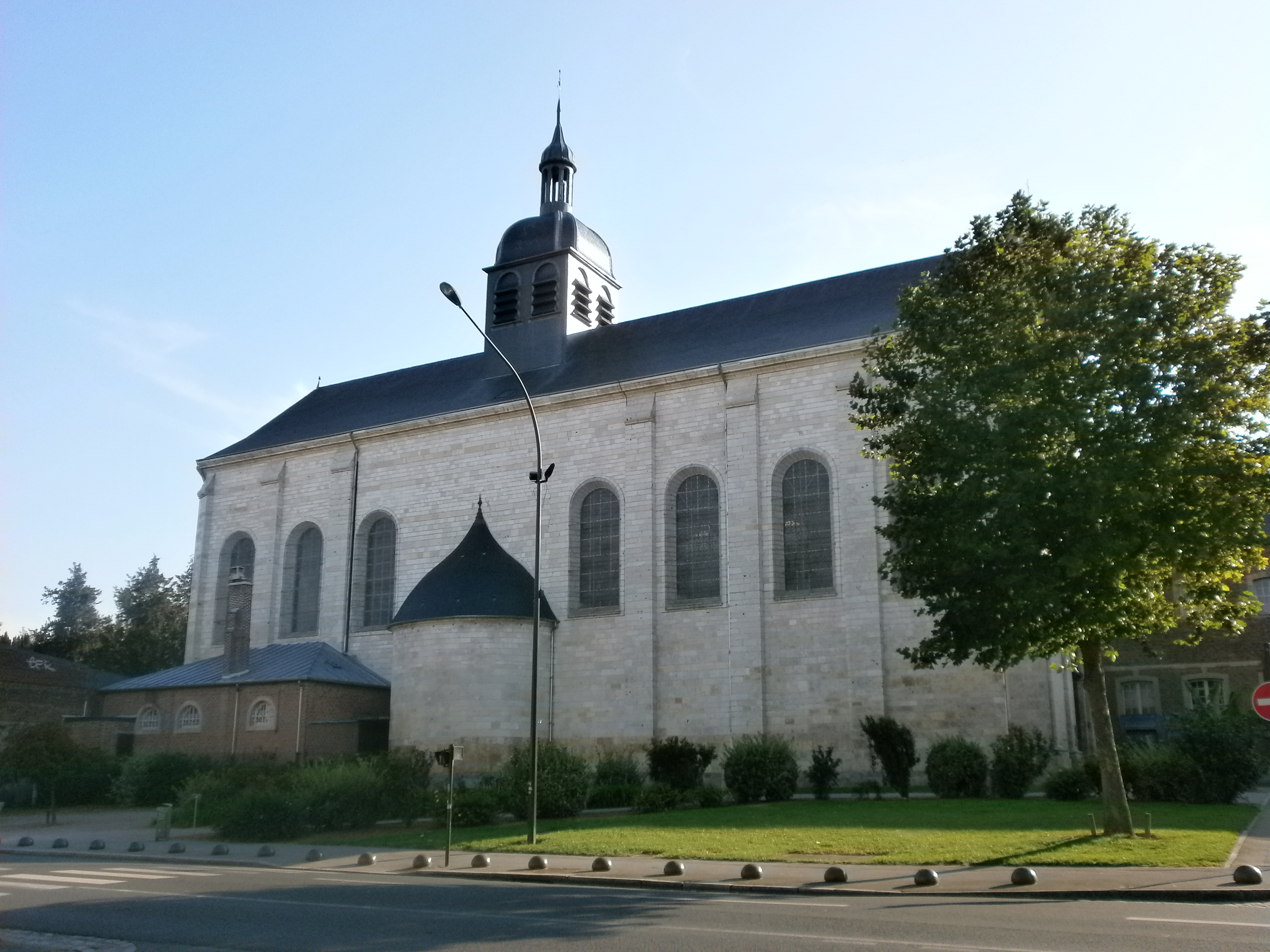
The church of Saint-Acheul

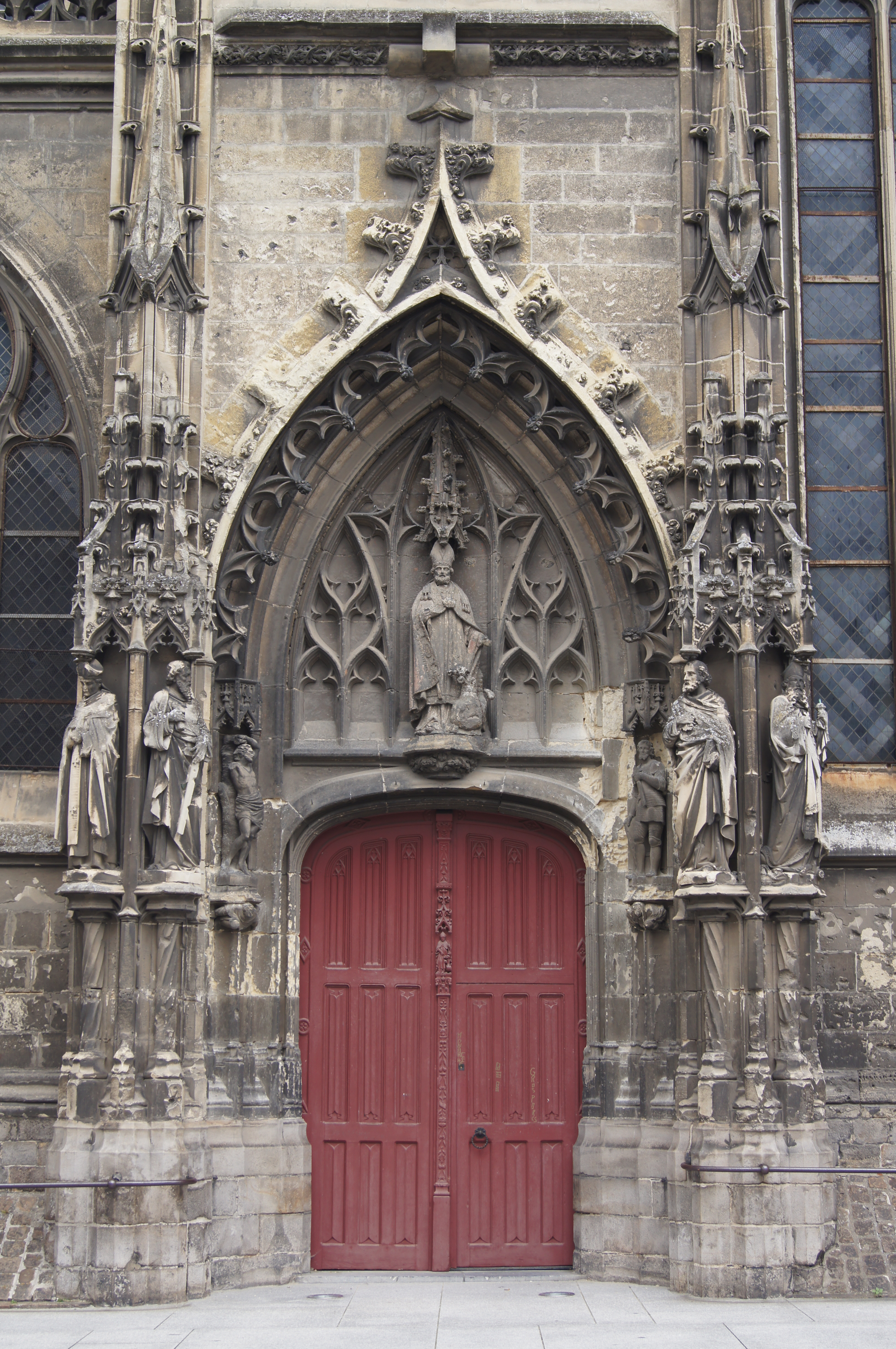
Door of the church of Saint-Germain-l'Écossais

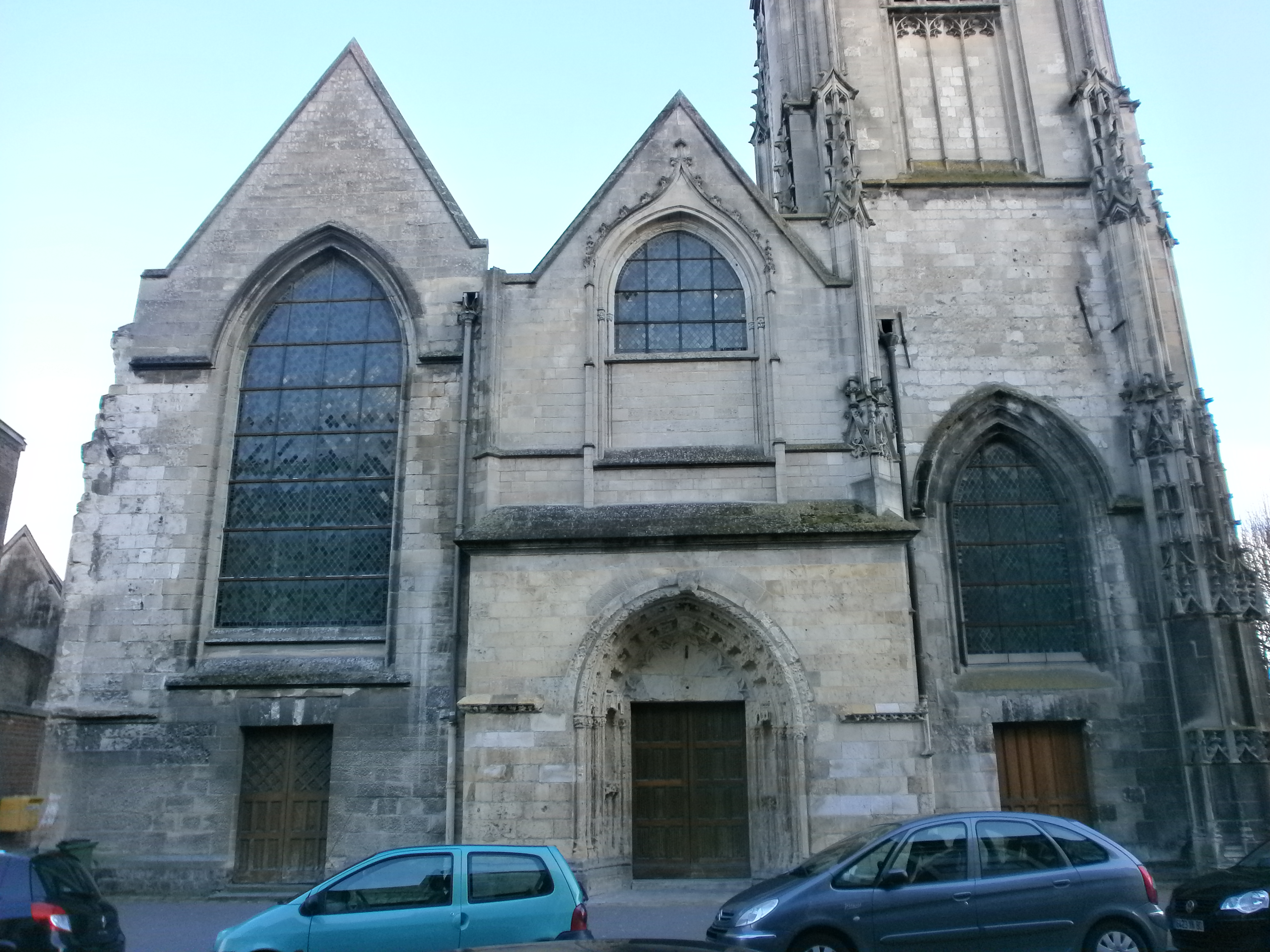
The Gothic façade of the church of Saint-Leu

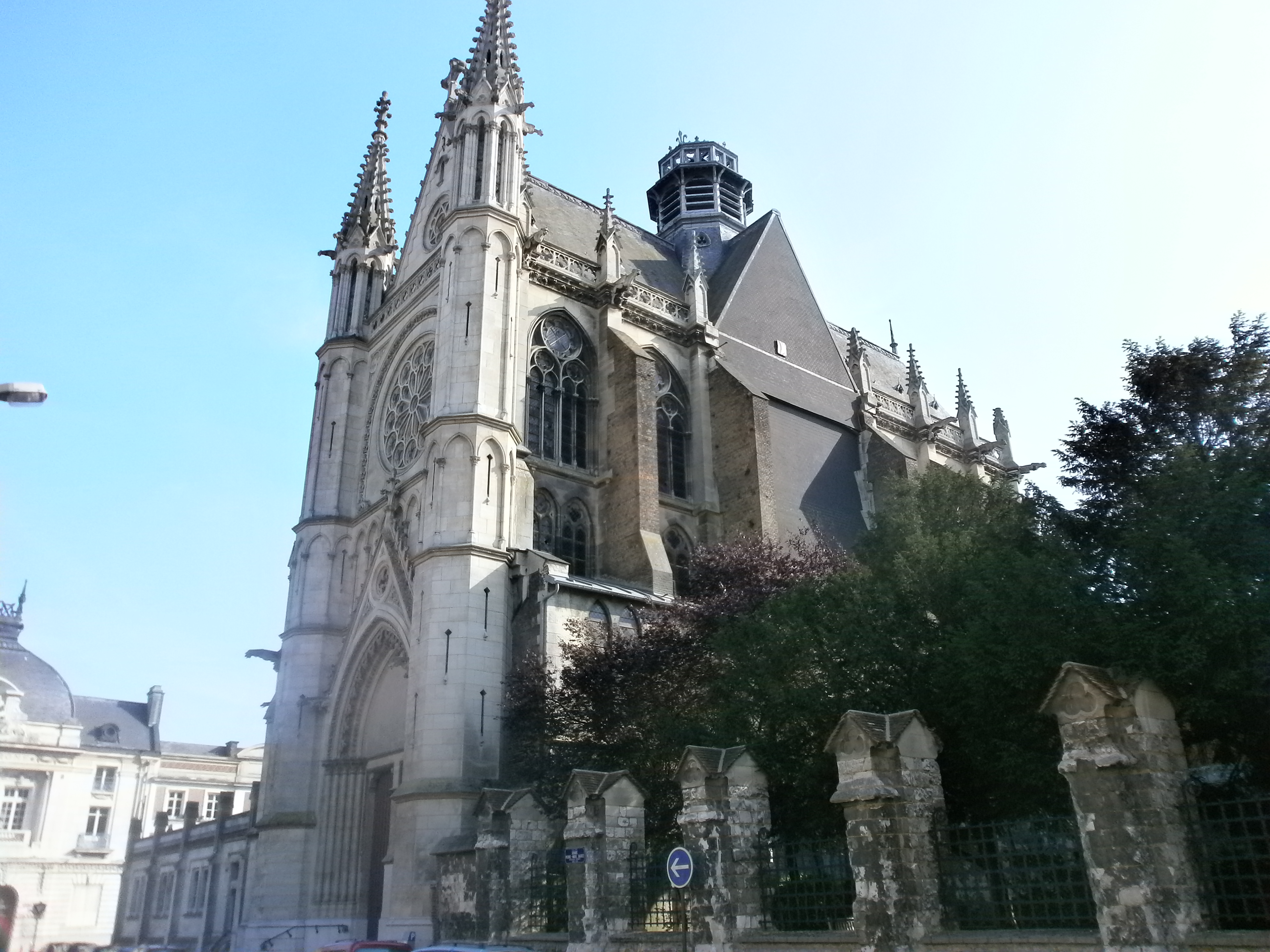
The church of Saint-Remi

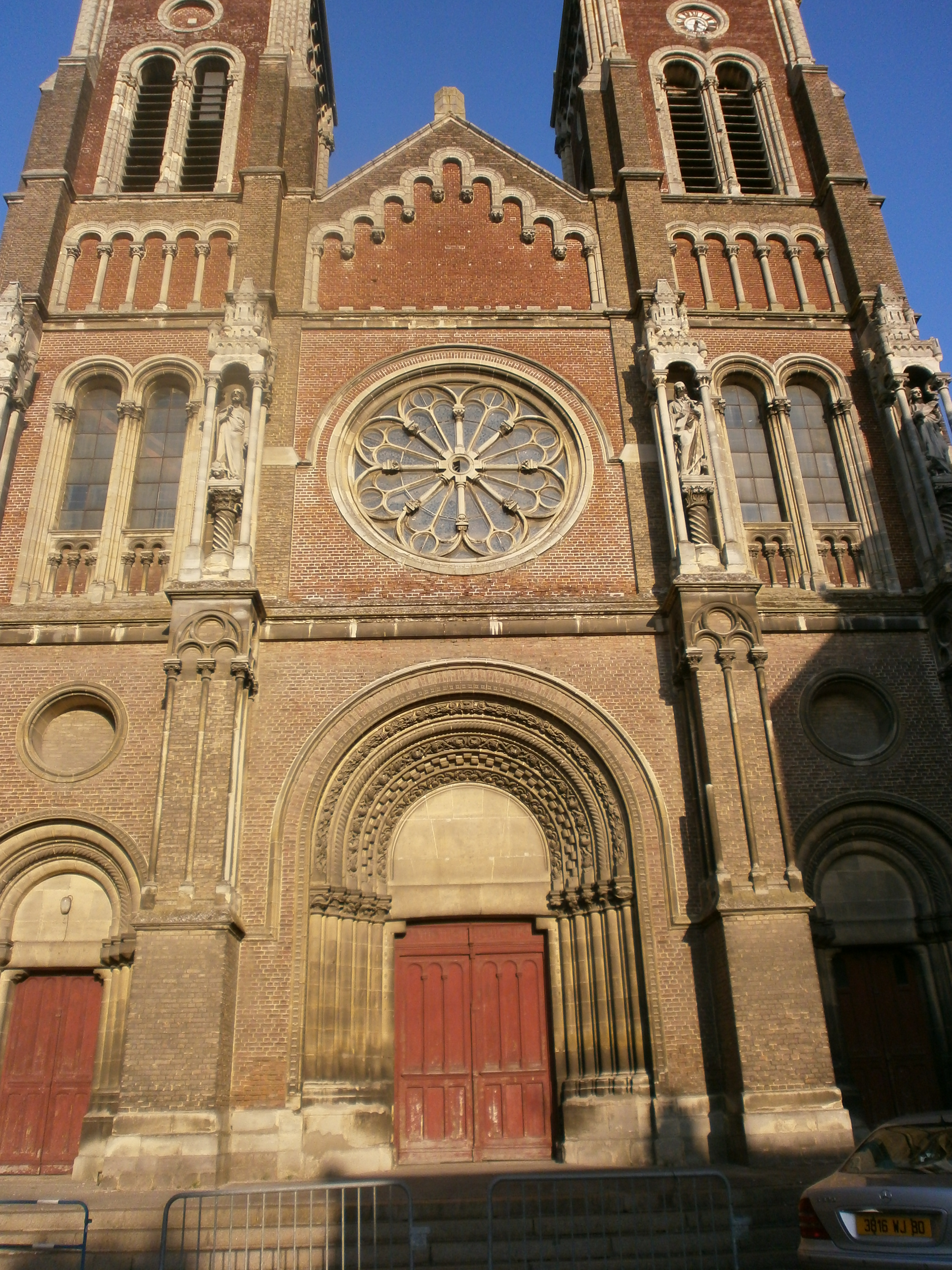
The church of Sainte-Anne

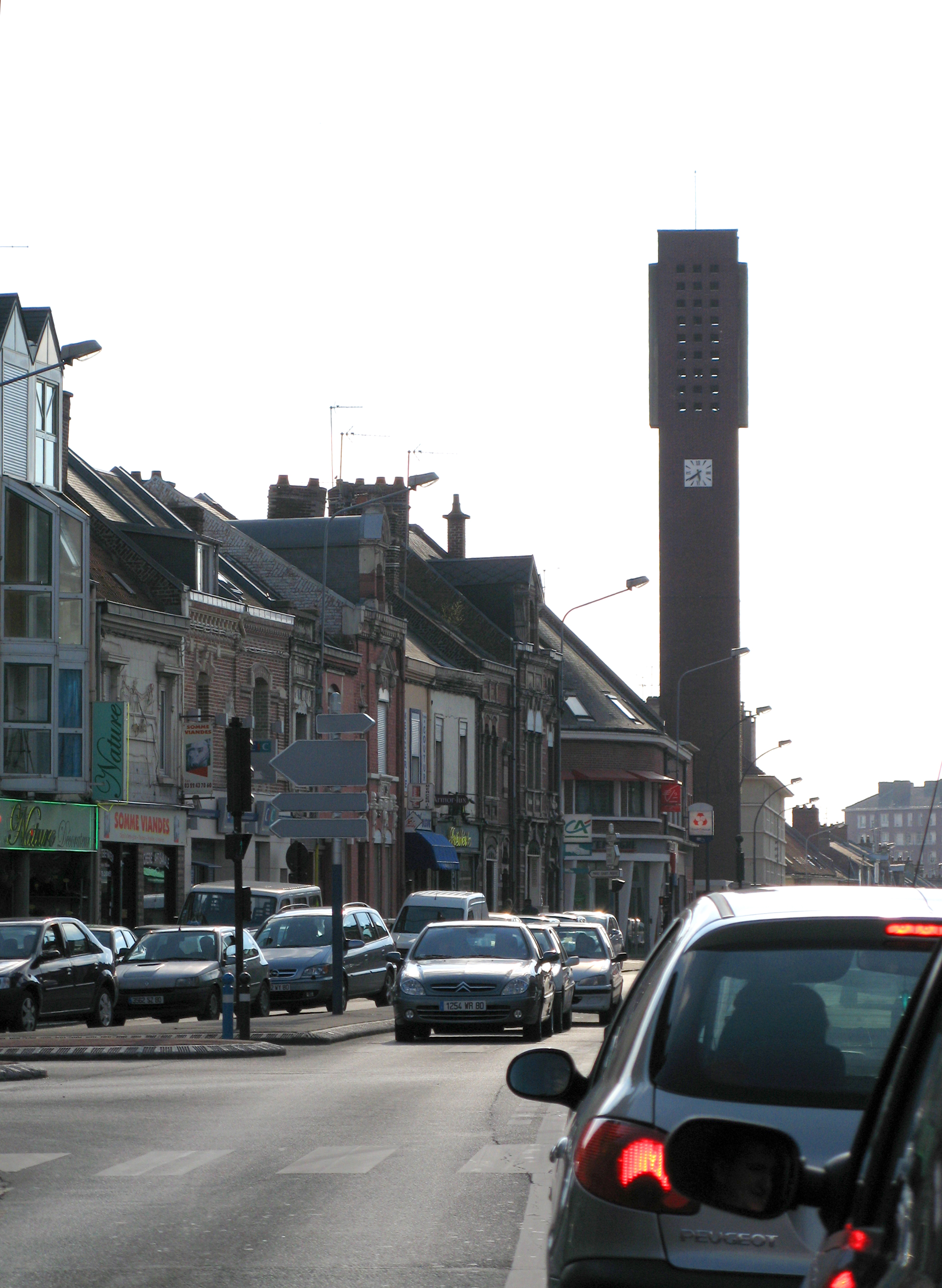
The bell tower of the church of Saint-Pierre

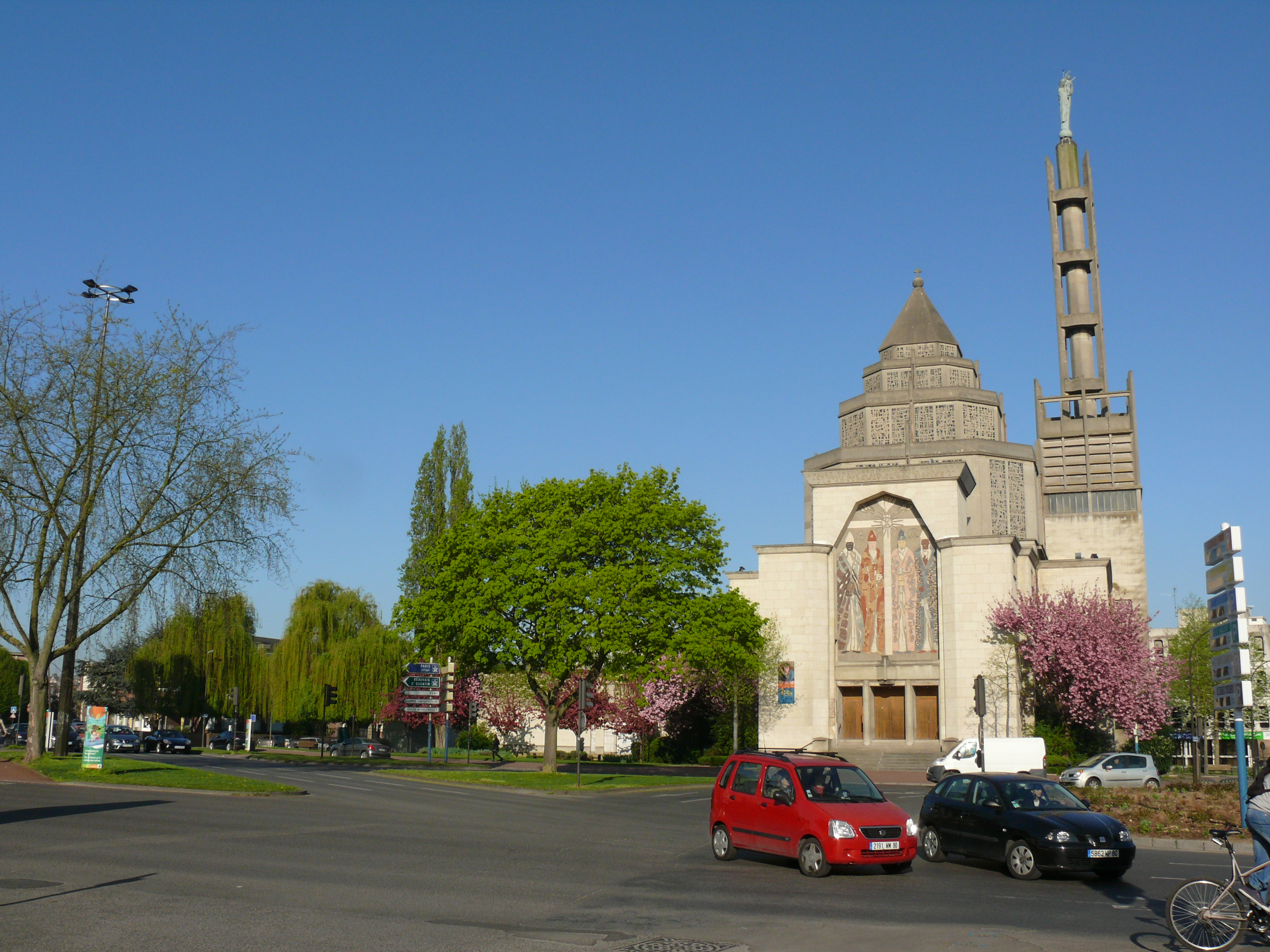
The church of Saint-Honoré, Esplanade Branly

==== Jewish ====
The synagogue in Amiens is located at 12 Rue du Port d'Amont, near Pont-Beauville.

==== Mormon ====
The Church of Jesus Christ of Latter-day Saints has a place of worship on the Doullens road.

==== Muslim ====
The city of Amiens has the largest Muslim community of Picardy and one of the largest in the north of France. Places of worship are evolving, several mosques are in a phase of expansion or relocation. The city has fifteen Muslim places of worship including eight independent prayer rooms and seven mosques:

- The An-Nour mosque where sits the Institute of the Arab-Muslim world of Picardy in Rue de la Hotoie.
- The Al-Fath mosque (currently moving premises), also the Association of Worship and Culture of Muslims in Picardy located at 375 Boulevard Beauvillé.
- The Al Badr mosque, also the Association of workers and Moroccan traders of Amiens, located at 33 Rue Winston-Churchill.
- The Masjid Al Muhsinin mosque located on the Rue de l'île-de-France.
- The Sounnahs mosque located Rue Victorine-Autier.
- The Chekkar mosque, also Association of the Committee of the Briqueterie located at 40 Rue Ronsard.
- The Mosque of the "19" is located at 19 Avenue de l'Europe and is home to the Association of Muslims in Picardy.

Several independent prayer rooms are present in the urban community. On the other hand, Muslim committees and associations exist in the image of the Islamic Cultural Centre of Amiens in the Rue de Savoie, the Muslim Cultural Freedom Association – Institute of Enlightenment and also the Association of residents of the home at 21 Route d'Allonville.

==== Protestant ====
The Protestant Church of Amiens, Rue Saint-Jacques.

== Economy ==
As both an industrial hub and a services center, Amiens enjoys a large pool of workers with a labor pool of over 350,000 inhabitants and numerous professional training courses.

The magazine L'Entreprise elected Amiens "Most attractive city of France" for businesses, in 2009 and 2007, for the category less than 200,000 inhabitants. The city finished second in 2010, 2008 and 2006. The strengths of the city include a developed real estate business and taxation around the average for French cities. In addition, its geographical position in the center of the triangle "Paris – London – Brussels", is between three major European cities.

The magazine Challenges has also designated Amiens as "Best managed city of France", for the category large cities with more than 100,000 inhabitants, in 2011, 2010 and 2008.

=== Income of the population and taxation ===
In 2010, the median taxable household income was €22,539, which placed Amiens at 177th place among the 31,525 communes with more than 39 households in metropolitan France.

In 2017, the proportion of taxable households was 45%.

=== Employment ===
In 2017, the population aged 15 to 64 years amounted to 91,555 persons, among which there were 64.5% of assets including 51.4% having a job and 13.1% of unemployed.

There were 78,284 jobs in the employment area, against 80,908 in 2007. The number of assets employed and residing in the area of employment being 47,588. The concentration of jobs indicator (Note: The concentration of employment indicator equals the number of jobs in the area per 100 people in active employment residing in the area, according to the Insee definition.) is 164.5%, which means that the employment area offers three jobs for every two active inhabitants.

Distribution of employment (2017)

	Public services	Tertiary sector	Industry	Construction	Agriculture
Amiens	42.7%	42.3%	10.5%	4.3%	0.2%
Source: Insee

Agriculture has very little representation among Amiens jobs with only 0.2%, just as the construction sector which represents 4.3% of jobs. Unlike these two sectors whose share is below the national average, the tertiary sector (trade, transport, services) represents a significant part of the Amiens workforce, 42.3%. Public services (public administration, education, health, social work) accounts for 42.7%. Industry includes 10.5% of jobs.

The Goodyear Tire and Rubber Company announced more than 400 job cuts in May 2008 at the Amiens plant, which has had 1,450 employees; in March 2009, the management announced new collective redundancies of a thousand jobs.

=== Businesses and shops ===
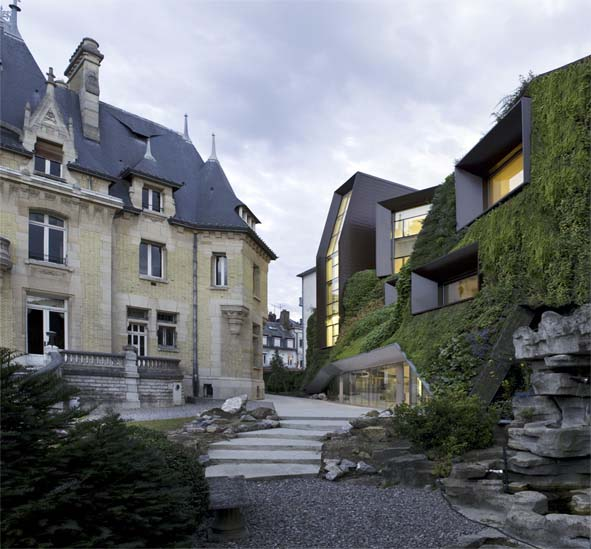
Chamber of commerce and industry of Amiens and Chartier-Corbasson architectes, in 2012

On 31 December 2015, at Amiens, there were 10,436 businesses: 51 in agriculture, forestry and fisheries, 394 in industry, 685 in construction, 7,110 in trade, transportation and various services and 2,196 were related to the administrative sector.

In 2018, 1,505 companies had been recorded as being established in Amiens, including 1,206 companies owned by sole proprietors.

Philatelic publishers Yvert et Tellier (catalogues of quotes) and l'Écho de la timbrologie (magazine) have their management in Amiens, even if they have more of their services in the Paris region. The Gueudet Group, one of the largest car dealers in France, was established at Amiens in 1918. The old textile tradition of the city remains with the factory of Lee Cooper France (122 employees).

Since the end of World War II, much of the city's economy was tied to automotive equipment with companies such as Valeo, Goodyear and Sumitomo-Dunlop tires. In 2003, the American Goodyear company bought Dunlop. These two companies suffered financially through late 2007 and early 2008, and in response, the American Goodyear company headquarters in the United States offered workers a change to their working hours and the number of posts, which a high percentage of staff refused.

Procter & Gamble, settled in Amiens in 1964 to produce soap, and inaugurated its new detergents unit in 1966. Established on over more than 45 hectares (110 acres), it is one of the largest factories in the world for laundry cleaning products (Ariel, Dash, Bonux, Gama) and for domestic cleaning products (Mr. Clean, Febreze). More than 85% of its production is intended for export.

The Amiens plant employs approximately 930 people.

Since the mid-1990s, the city has tried to convert the economy towards the internet and telephony industries. Many call centres (Intracall center, Coriolis France, Médiamétrie) have opened mainly within the city, region or state. The Unilog (now Logica) computer service company has installed a service center in Amiens (the CSA).

Amiens is the seat of the Regional Chamber of commerce and industry of Picardy. It is also the seat of the Chamber of commerce and industry of Amiens. It manages the Amiens - Glisy Aerodrome.

== Culture, tourism and heritage ==
The strategic position of Amiens makes it an attractive destination for a weekend or a few days, from Paris, Lille or Brussels. Amiens also benefits from the proximity of the Baie de Somme, a tourist hotspot registered at the Club des plus belles baies du monde and labelled Great Site of France.

Amiens has the label of Towns and Lands of Art and History since 1992. Within this framework, the host of the heritage organises guided tours on themes intended for an audience of adults and children, with educational workshops. A signposted circuit allows an independent tour of the town, with information panels offering comment on places and notable buildings.

Amiens has an important historical and cultural heritage, and an accessible and varied natural heritage, on which tourism is based. The main attractions are the cathedral, which is included in the world heritage of UNESCO, the hortillonnages, Jules Verne House, the Tour Perret, the Musée de Picardie, the zoo, and the Saint-Leu and Saint-Maurice neighborhoods.

=== Places and monuments ===
The commune has an exceptional heritage: 60 monuments listed in the inventory of monuments historiques and over 1600 places and monuments listed in the general inventory of cultural heritage; and on the other hand, 187 objects listed in the inventory of monuments historiques and 254 objects listed in the general inventory of cultural heritage. The information given below is relative only to a brief selection.

==== Notre-Dame d'Amiens ====
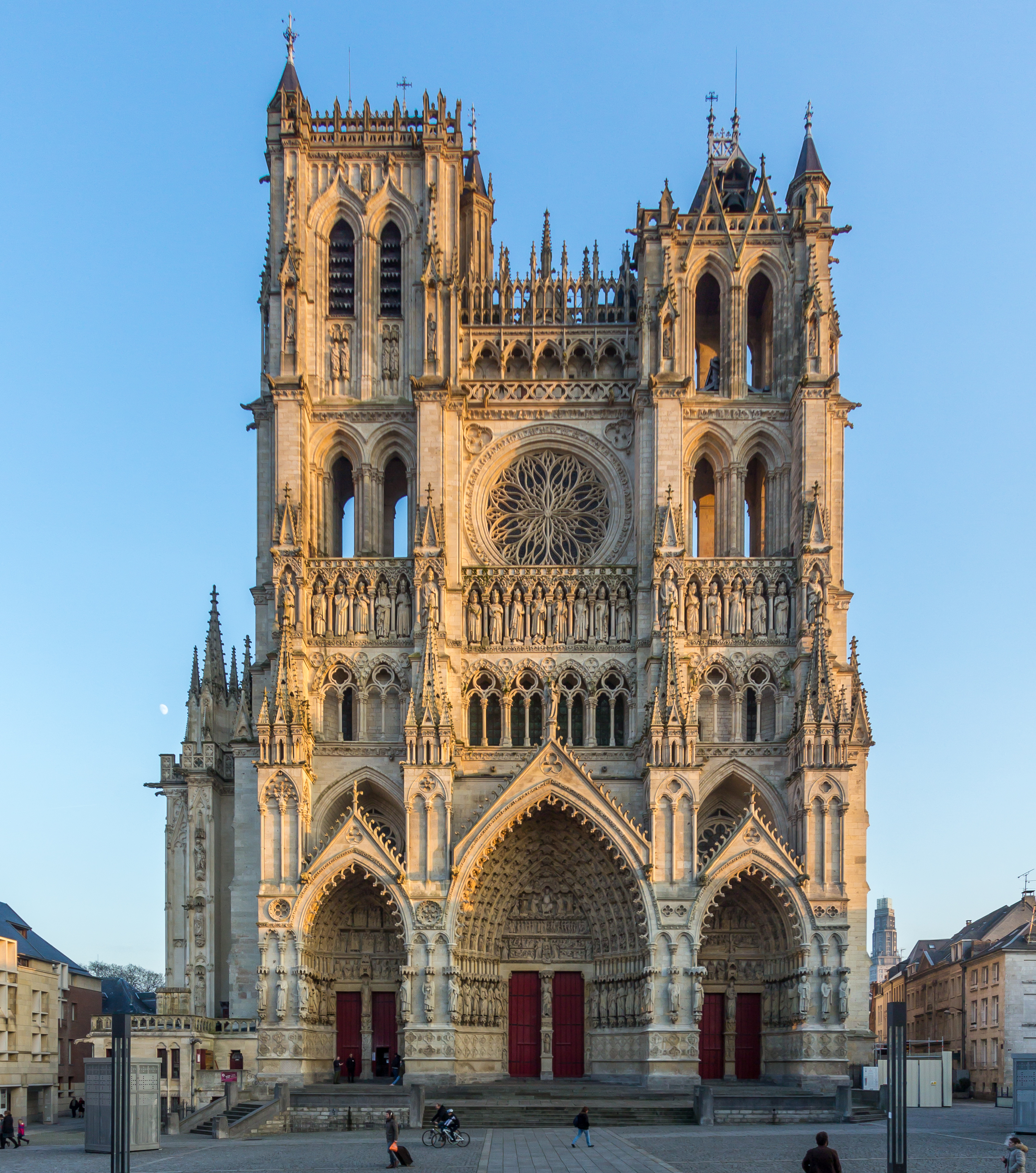
Façade of Notre-Dame Cathedral

C’est une femme adorable, cette Cathédrale, c’est une Vierge. [...] Point de confusion vaine, ici, point d’exagération ni d’enflure. C’est l’empire absolu de l’élégance suprême.

[She's an adorable woman, this Cathedral – a Virgin. [...] No empty confusion, here, no exaggeration or pompousness. It is the absolute empire of supreme elegance.]

— Auguste Rodin, Les cathédrales de France (1914)

Amiens Cathedral deserves the name given by M. Viollet-le-Duc, 'the Parthenon of Gothic architecture'.

— John Ruskin, The Bible of Amiens

The city is famous for its Notre-Dame Cathedral, masterpiece of Gothic art and one of the largest cathedrals in the world by its interior volume (200,000 m^{3} (7,100,000 cu ft)). The largest religious and medieval building of France, its interior could twice hold Notre-Dame de Paris.

The cathedral measures 145 metres (476 ft) long and its spire rises 112 metres (367 ft) high. The vaults of the central nave, finished in 1247, are 42.3 metres (139 ft), close to the maximum limit for this architecture.

Dating back to the 13th century, its construction is due to the wealth of the city in the Middle Ages and to the fire of the Romanesque cathedral which stood previously. Three architects, including Robert of Luzarches succeeded to complete the construction.

Amiens Cathedral is notable for the coherence of its plan, the beauty of its three-tier interior elevation, the particularly fine display of sculptures on the principal façade and in the south transept, and inlays of its floor. It is also described by John Ruskin as "Gothic, clear of Roman tradition and of Arabian taint, Gothic pure, authoritative, unsurpassable, and unaccusable."

Considered the archetype of Gothic style, the cathedral also includes some elements of Rayonnant and Flamboyant Gothic. It was built remarkably quickly, with the main structure completed in only about 70 (1220 to 1269), which explains its stylistic unity. The façade is decorated with more than 3,000 statues, gargoyles and chimeras.

Registered since 1981 as a World Heritage Site of UNESCO, it is a "masterpiece of world heritage". For a second time in 1998, it is a monumental step on the Camino de Santiago. Despite the two World Wars of the 20th century, which severely affected the city, it managed to stay intact.

A show of the reproduction of the original polychromy of façades, discovered as a result of recent laser cleaning, is given annually for free in December and during the summer period. The show is a projection on the façade of slides in color.

The zodiac is a set of reliefs on the foundations of the western façade formed series of quatrefoil medallions, carved in a representative agrarian calendar and the signs of the zodiac.

The statue of the weeping Angel that is on a tomb carved by Nicolas Blasset, and the reliefs evoking Saint-Firmin and St. John the Baptist, are some of the well-known works of the cathedral.

At ground level lies the intact labyrinth of 234 metres (768 ft) long.

On the north side of the cathedral is the former Palace of the Bishop of Amiens, occupied by the École supérieure de commerce in Amiens.

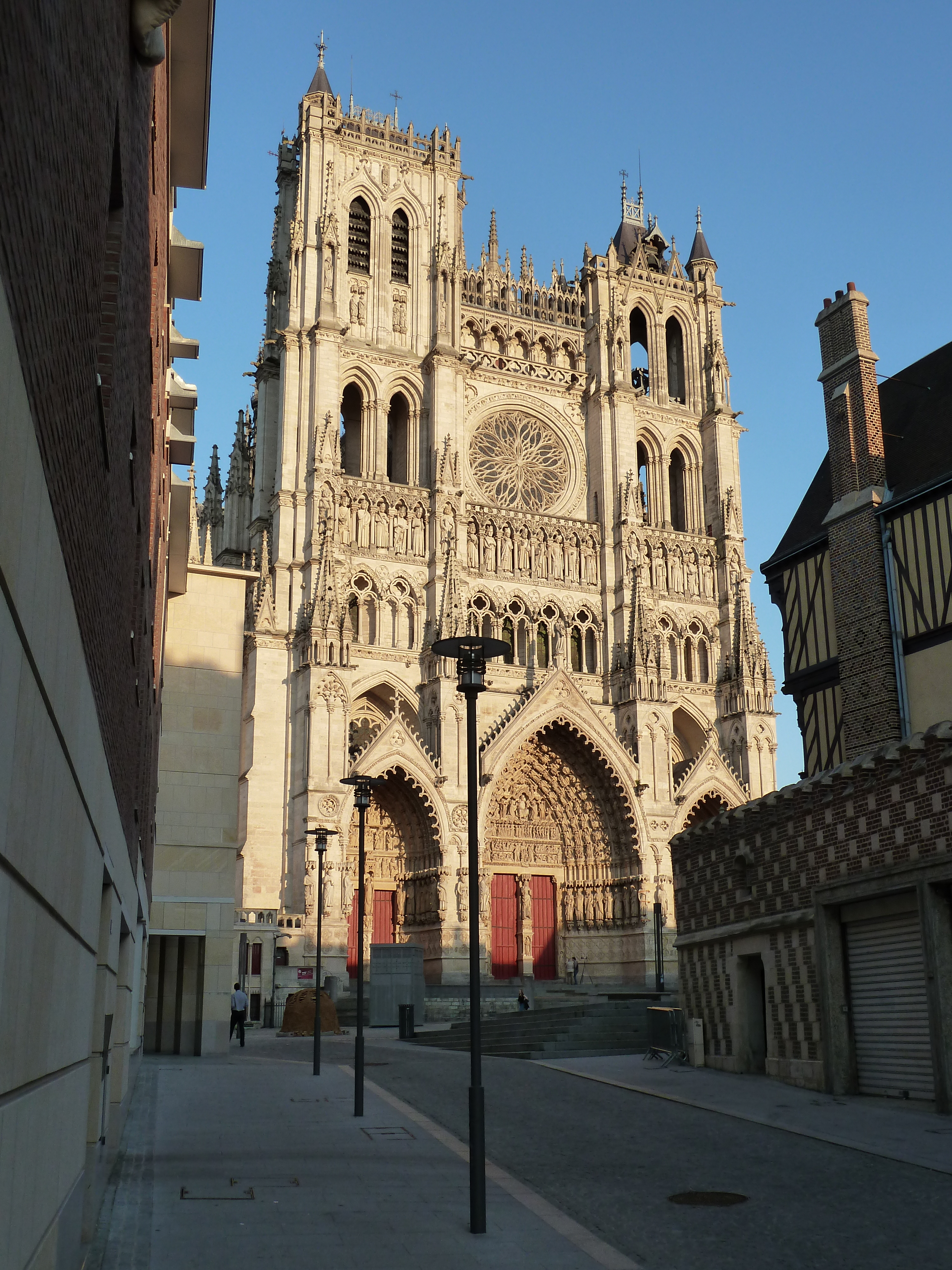
The cathedral seen from the Rue André

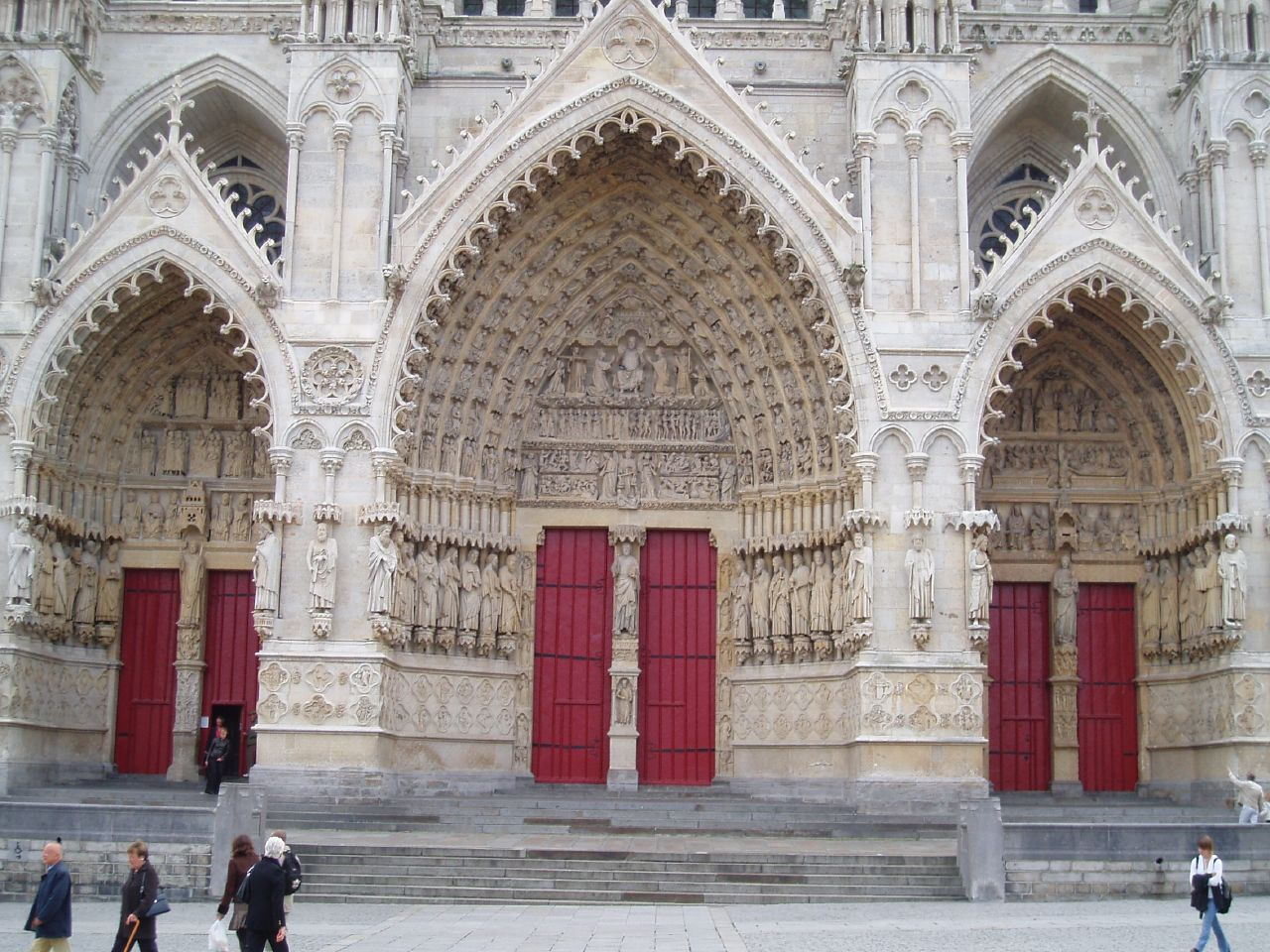
West entrance

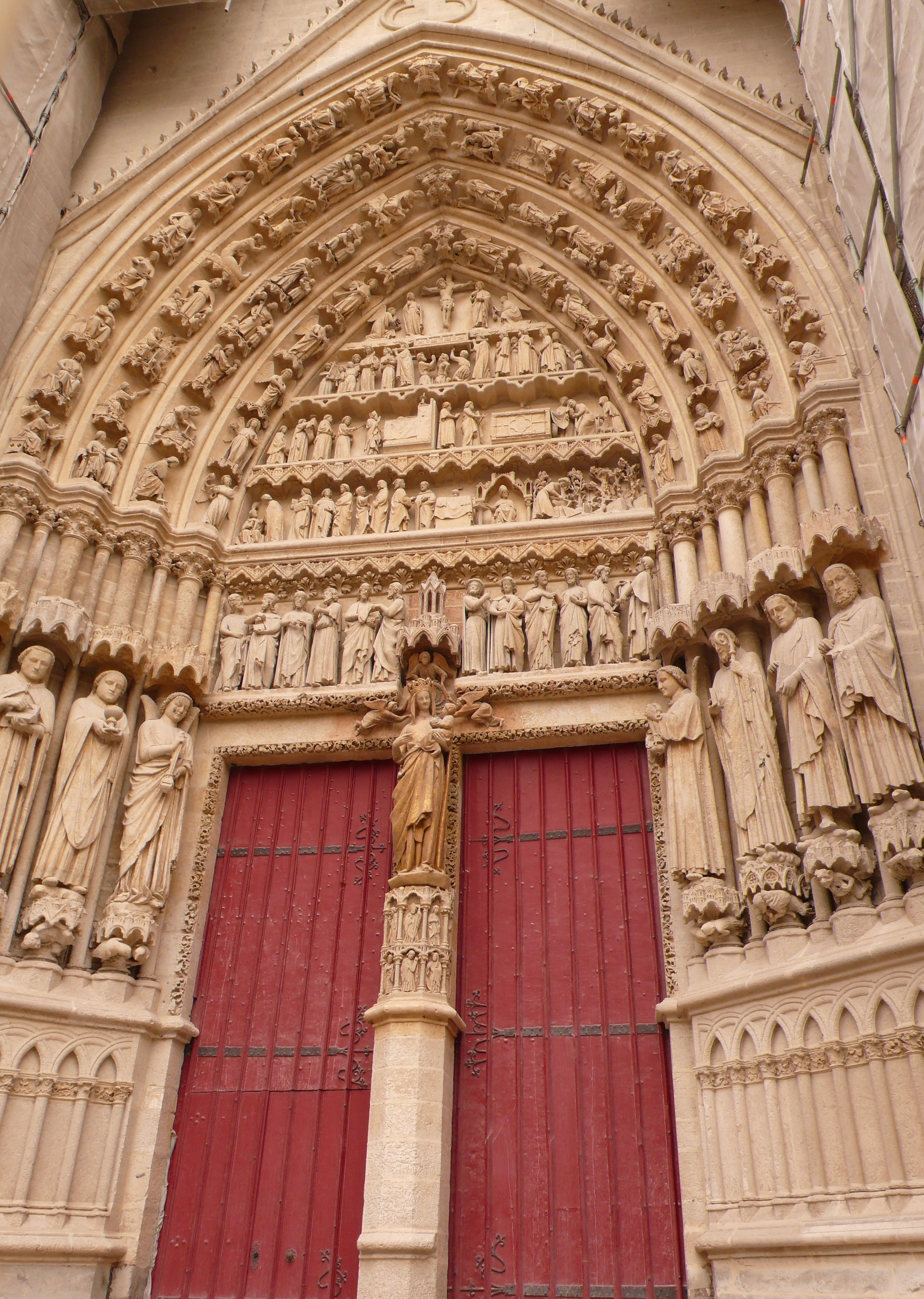
Entrance

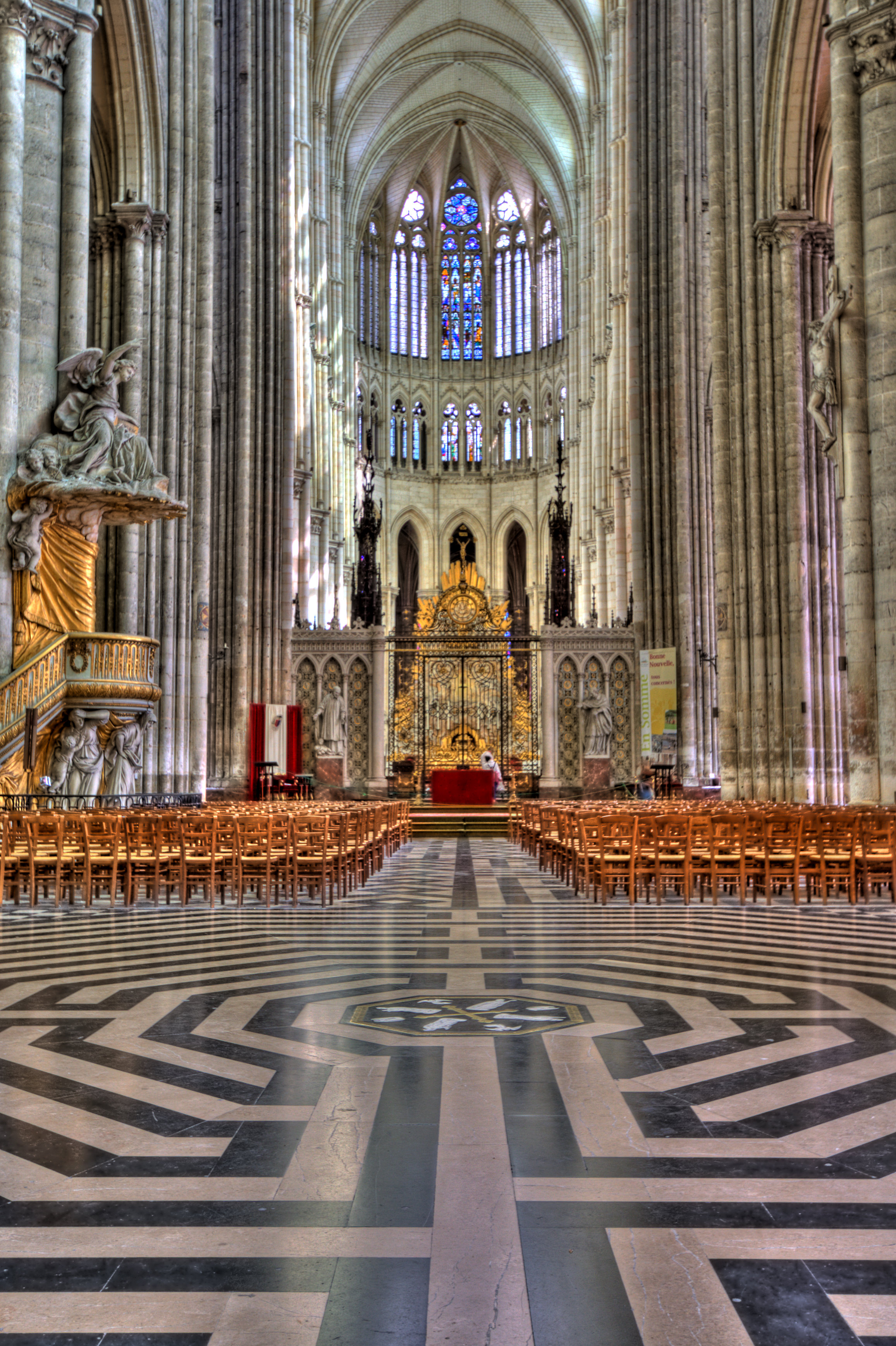
The labyrinth

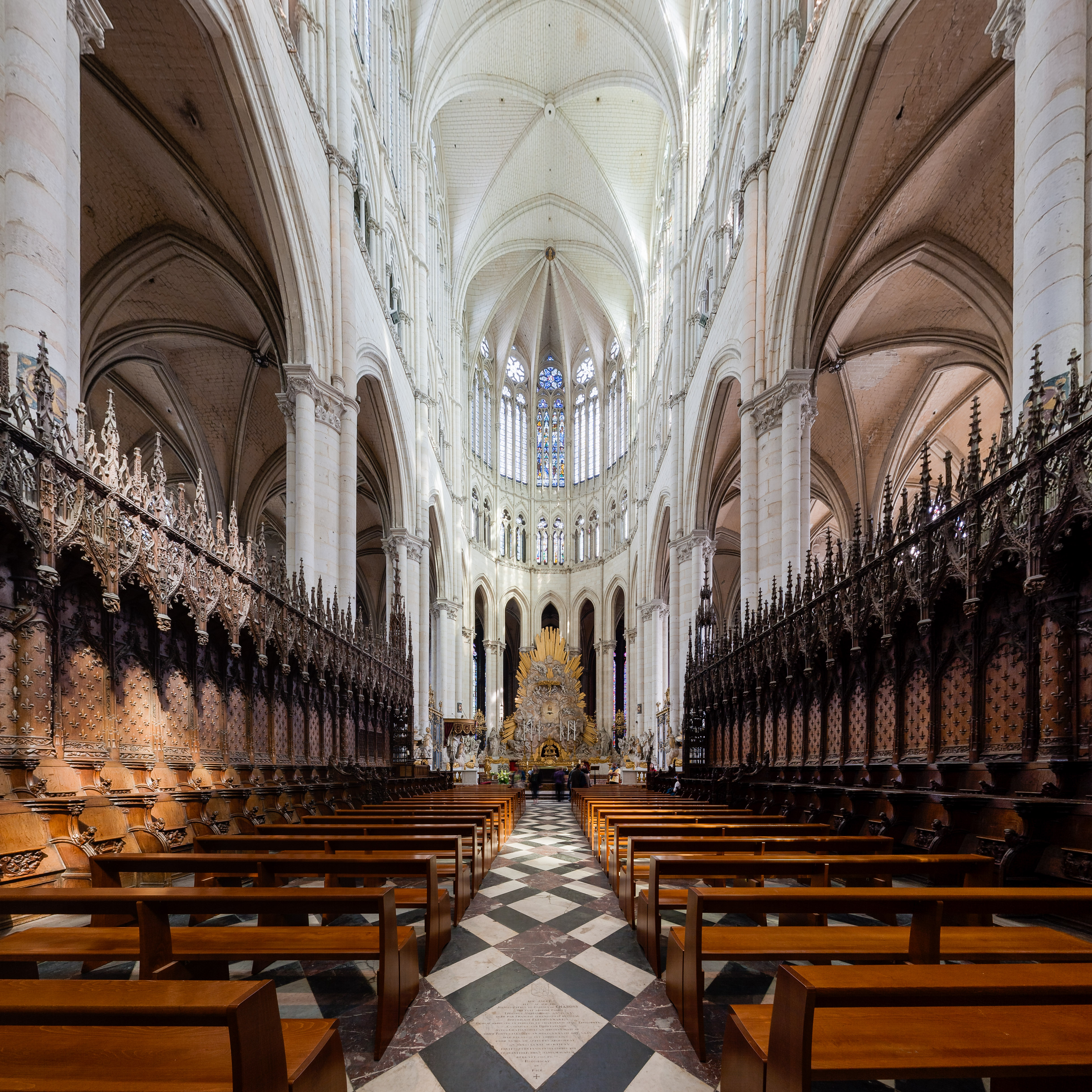
The choir

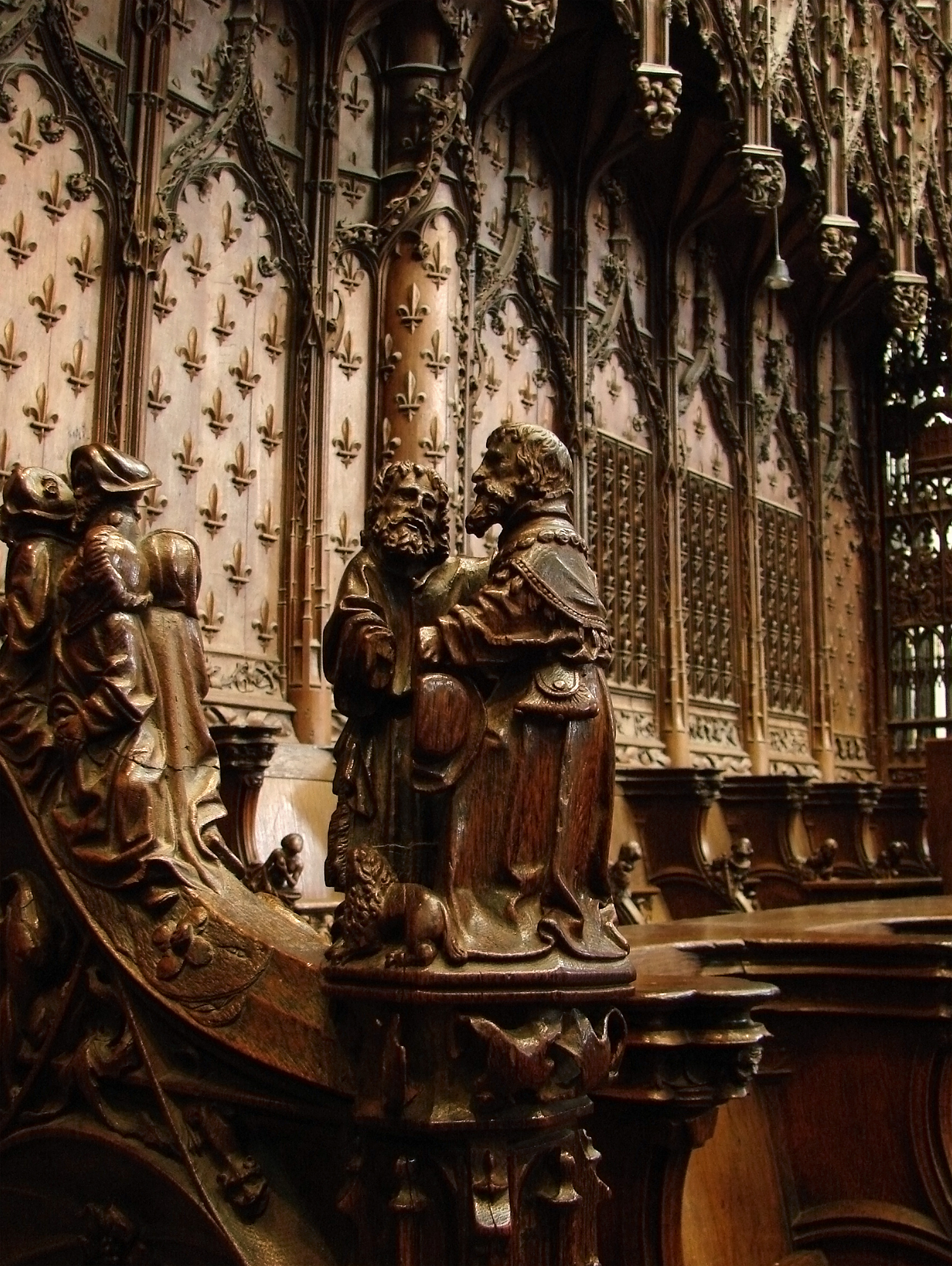
Columns

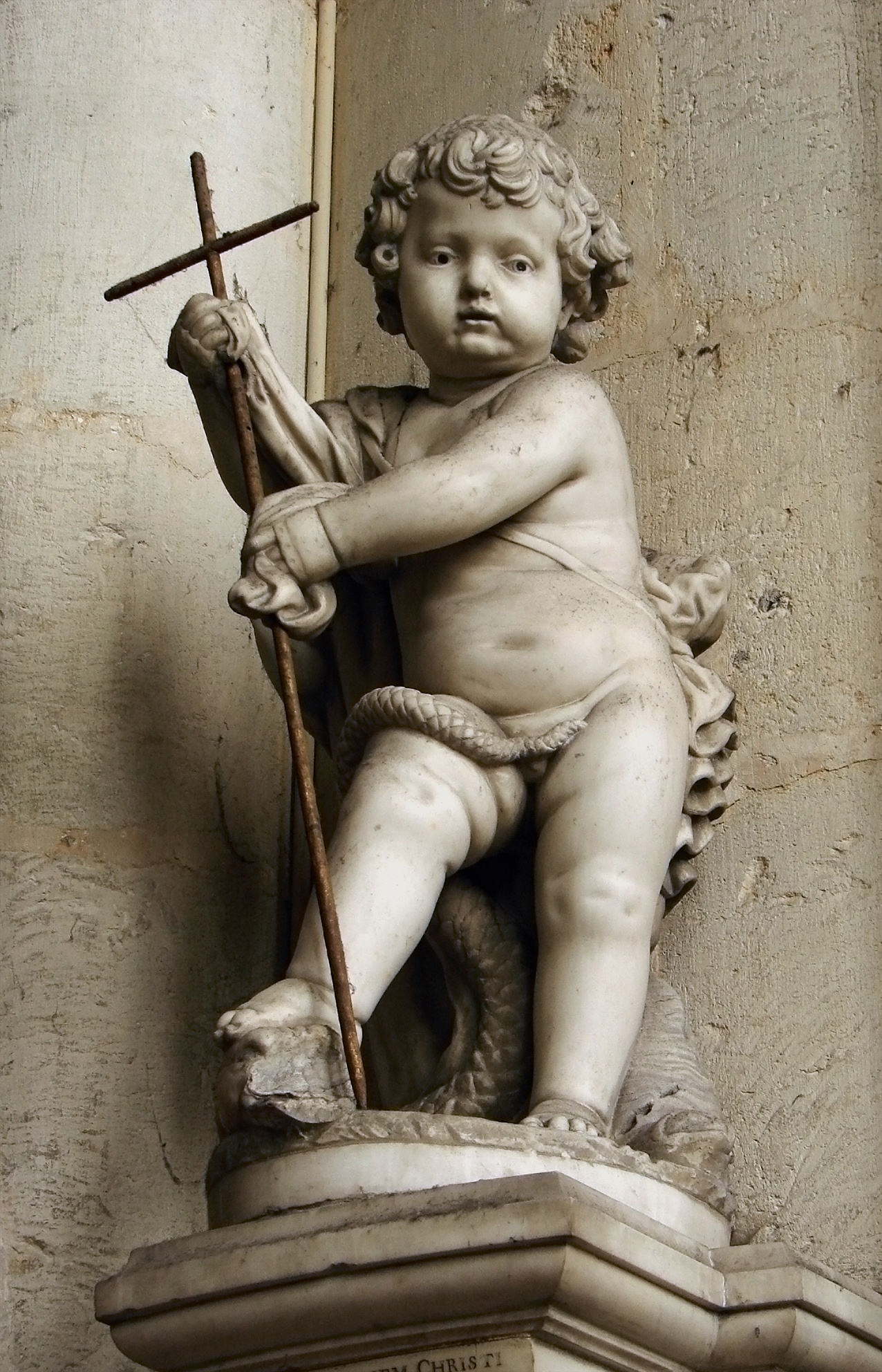
Mausoleum of Charles de Vitry

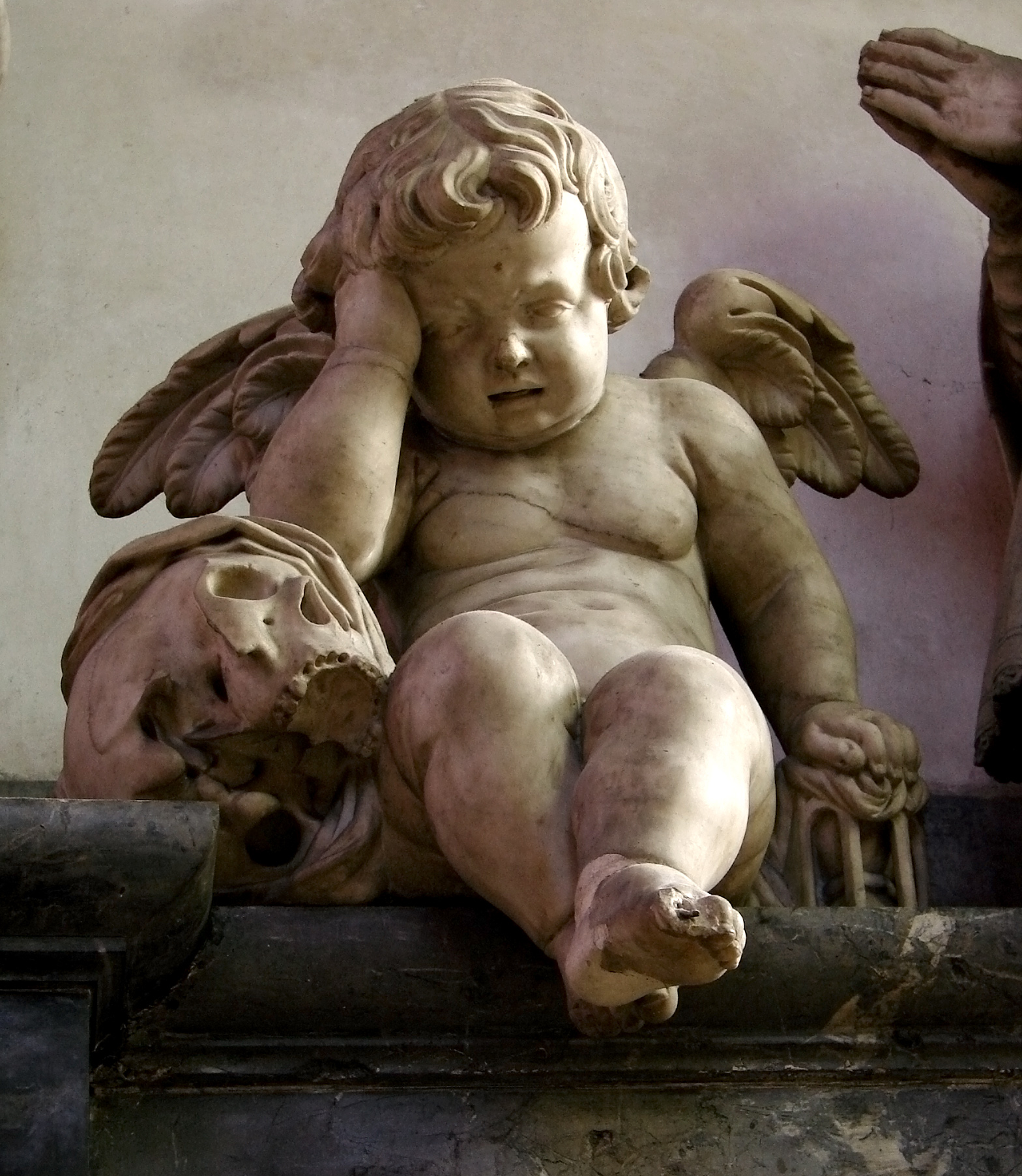
Tomb of Canon Lucas

==== Belfry ====
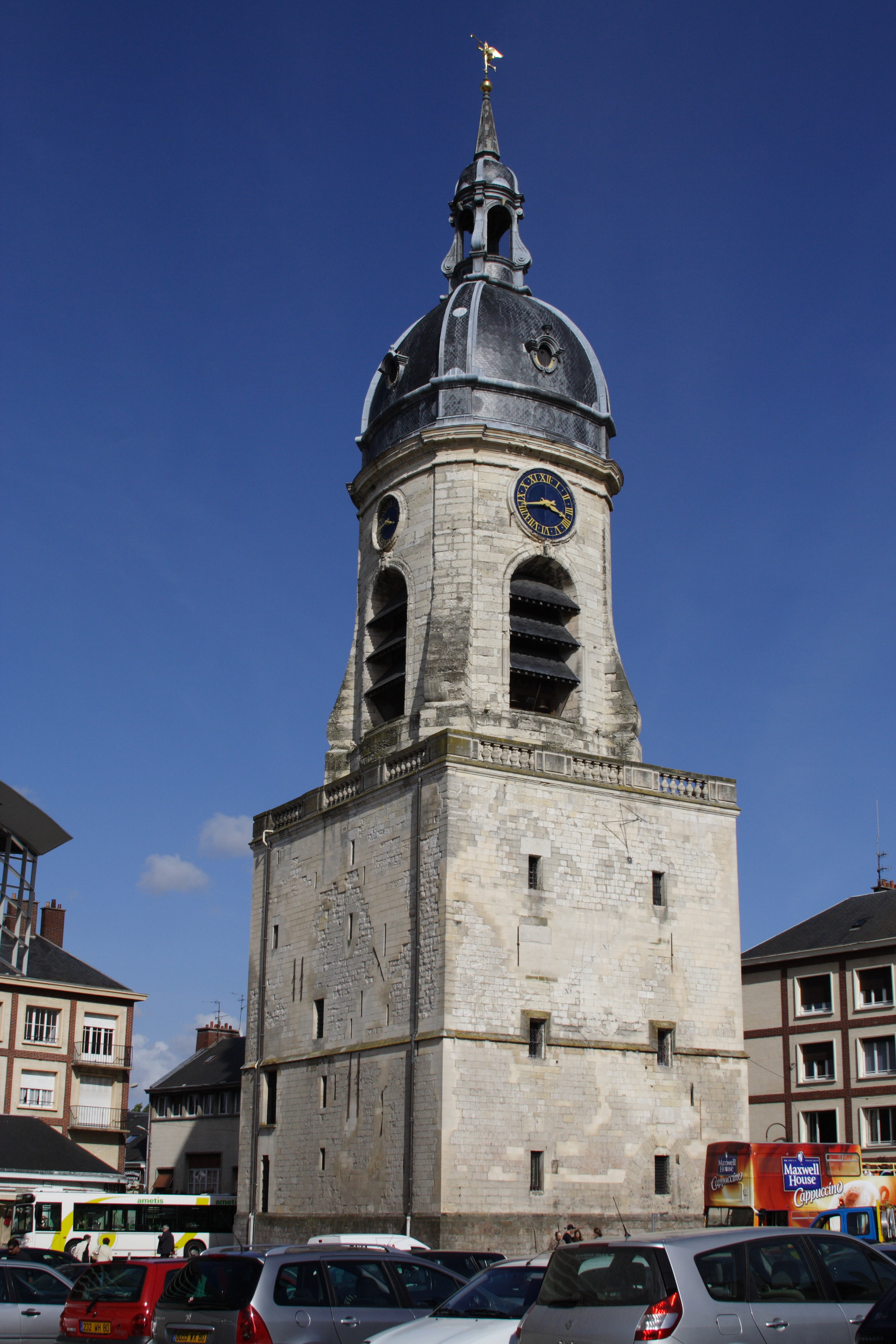
The belfry of Amiens

The origin of the Belfry of Amiens dates back to the establishment of the commune of Amiens by Louis VI. It is mentioned for the first time in an arbitral award issued by the chapter of Amiens in 1244.

Symbolizing the independence of the commune, it was formerly used for meetings of the notables of the city and then as archive rooms, weapons store and prison. A spotter nearby monitored arrivals and warned the population of the external dangers. During the Middle Ages, the building was repeatedly engulfed by fire.

The belfry is composed of a base in white cut stone, built in the 15th century between 1406 and 1410, a stone superstructure bell tower built from 1749 with Baroque volutes at its base, and a dome covered with slate and then the renowned arrow weather vane. At the time, a huge 11-ton bell was installed inside, it was later destroyed along with the dome, whose copper component melted, in the bombardment and fire of the city on 19 May 1940. Abandoned and devoid of a roof since World War II, the monument was fully restored between February 1989 and July 1990.

Located on the Place au Fil, the old central square of the city before the arrival of the railway and the rise of the Rue des Trois Calloux, the belfry is adjacent to Les Halles and the back of the Hôtel de Ville (city hall). At a height of 52 metres (171 ft), it rings every hour of the day.

Since July 2005, the belfry of Amiens is a UNESCO World Heritage Site, as part of a set of 56 Belfries of Belgium and France which were inscribed because of their architecture and their importance in the rise of municipal power in Northern France and Belgium. The belfry is also recorded in the inventory of Historic Monuments.

==== Cirque Jules-Verne ====
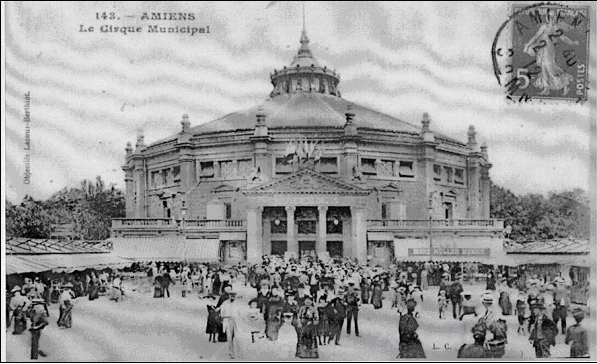
The municipal circus of Amiens in 1912, on the festival of Saint Jean.

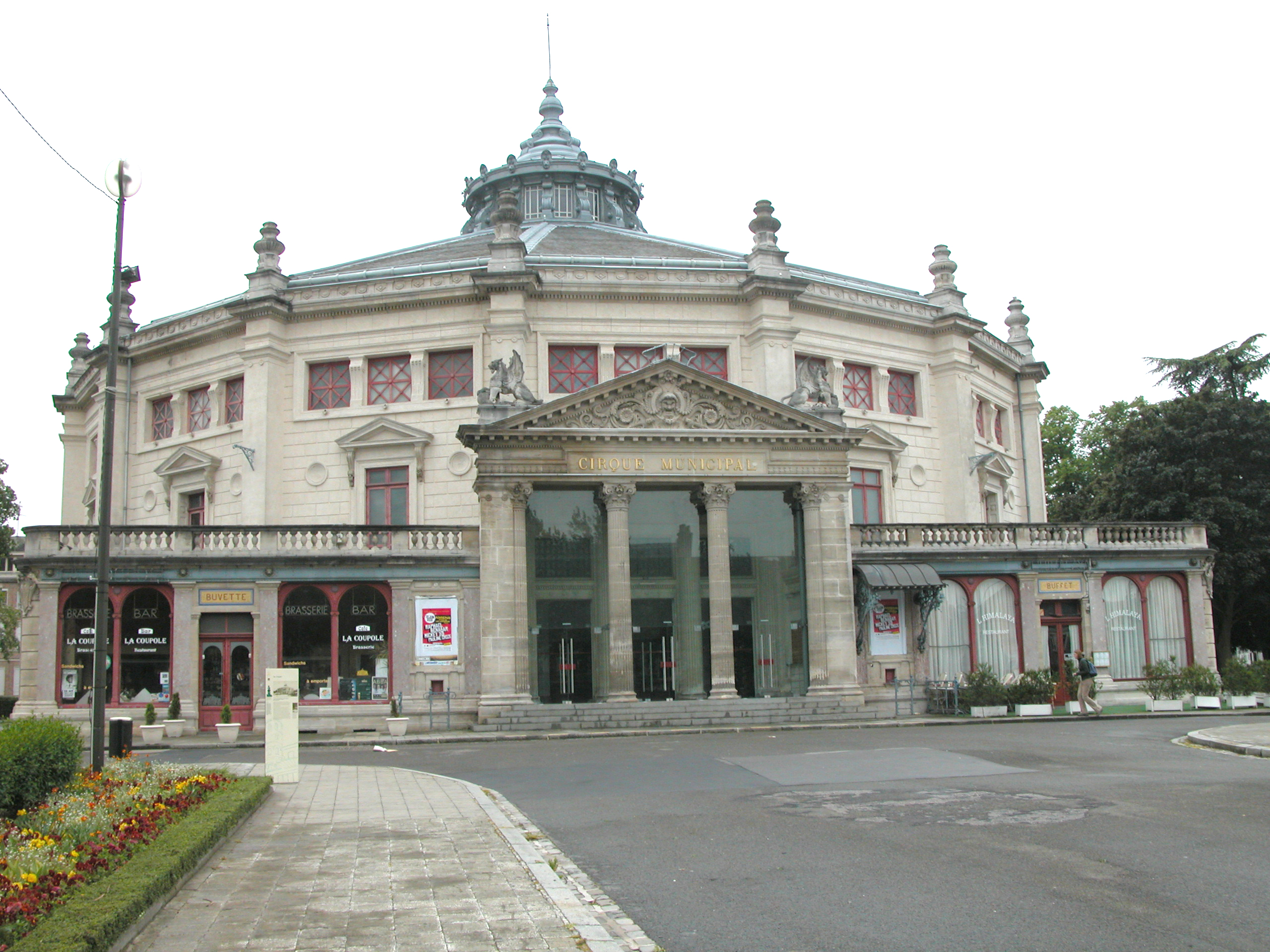
The municipal circus of Amiens in 2006.

In 1845, the traditional fair of Saint-Jean, formerly held at Place René Goblet, was transferred to Place Longueville. It is a wide esplanade that took the place of the Longueville bastion, after the demolition of the city walls in the early 19th century. Each year, a temporary circus is established for this occasion.

In 1865, a circus company emerged to claim a permanent circus, which would be built in wood by the Schytte contractor in 1874. However, expensive maintenance prompted the municipality to consider the construction of a new building. The decision was made in 1886 under the leadership of Mayor Frédéric Petit and the work began.

The Chief Architect of the Somme, Émile Ricquier, a disciple of Gustave Eiffel, was responsible for its construction. It was inspired by the Cirque d'hiver of Paris but with a cast metal frame, supplemented by brick from the local countryside. The architect of civil buildings, Charles Garnier, claimed that the frames should be hidden with a plaster imitating stone. The "moderninst" design of Ricquier, who chose to display the structure, and to favor local material such as brick, is visible at the rear of the monument.

With its 16-sided polygonal shape and a diameter of 44 metres (144 ft), it includes lodges and stalls in its enclosure. As a completely modern project, it hosted two steam engines, dedicated to fully electric lights and central heating. Since its construction, it was also the first circus which included a buffet and a refreshment bar. The cost of the construction of the building finally reached double the forecast. In 1888, the new city councilor responsible for festivals and celebrations, Jules Verne, was responsible for monitoring the work, and it was he who opened it on Sunday 23 June 1889, for the opening of the fair and the centenary of the French Revolution:

The new circus is a work of art that your municipal administration wanted to build with all of the enhancements of modern industry. It is the very best, undoubtedly, it is also the most comprehensive, with its facilities and equipment, to have been built in France and abroad.

— Jules Verne

The roof was damaged by a shell in 1916. The circus was the setting for Federico Fellini's The Clowns (1971), and the film by Jean-Jacques Beineix, Roselyne and the Lions (1989), with Isabelle Pasco as lead actress. The largest of the circuses of the province with its 3,000-seats, the building has acquired a multidisciplinary use for decades of performances of theatre, dance, concerts, galas, sports and public meetings.

Renovated in 2003, it now bears the name of Cirque Jules-Verne. After hosting the performances of Cirque Rancy, it hosts resident Cirque Arlette Gruss.

Since 1 January 2011, the circus has been labelled "national hub circus and street arts", managed by an EPCC. It is one of seven in France and is still in use today.

==== The house of Jules-Verne ====
In 1882, Jules Verne and his wife, Honorine, rented the house at the corner of Rue Charles-Dubois and Boulevard Longueville until 1900. Acquired in 1980 by the city, the house is labeled Maisons des Illustres by the Ministry of Culture. Restored in 2006, thanks to the work of the Centre international Jules-Verne, this 19th-century mansion, registered as a national heritage site, traces through the exhibition of more than 700 objects, the personality, the sources of inspiration, and memories of Jules Verne.

==== Tour Perret ====
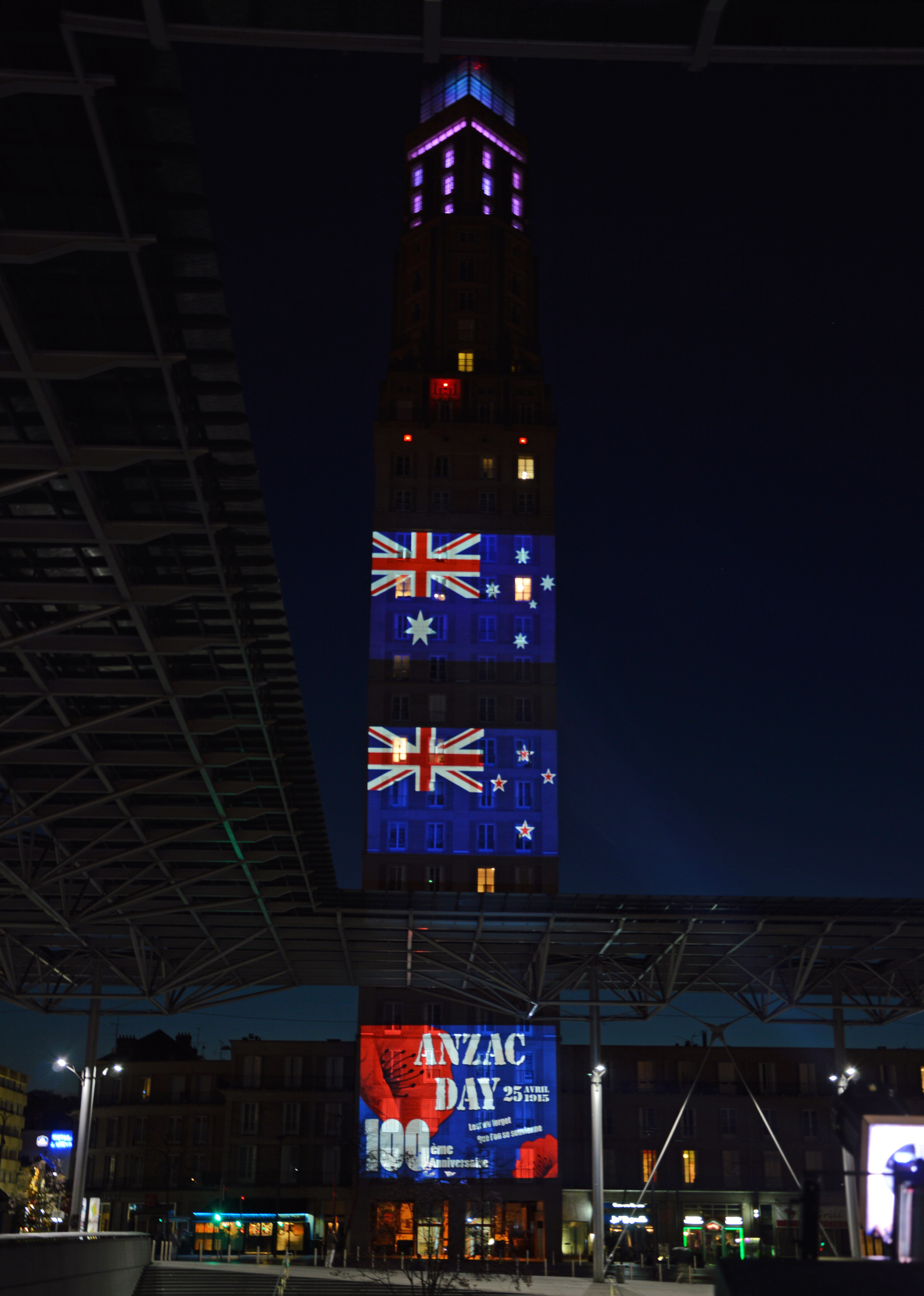
The Tour Perret lit in colour for the 100th anniversary of Anzac Day

Opposite the Gare d'Amiens, is located the Tour Perret (from the name of its architect Auguste Perret). Over 100 metres (330 ft) high, it was one of the first skyscrapers built in Europe, and the highest for a long time.

==== The Church of Saint-Leu ====
The Église Saint-Leu d'Amiens was built at the end of the 15th century, on the model of the hall-churches. It is dedicated, as its district, to Saint Leu, referring to the 7th century bishop who was exiled to the Vimeu. It has three naves. A flamboyant portal adorns the base of the steeple. The latter, struck by lightning, had to be rebuilt at the beginning of the 16th century. The ends of beams are carved. Stone and wood statues date from the 17th century. The choir houses the glory of the Duthoit brothers.

==== Other notable buildings or monuments ====
===== Architecture from antiquity =====
- Numerous archaeological excavations have uncovered remains from proto-historic times to the Roman era. Two skylights cut in the last development of Place Gambetta, allow observation of a few remains of the forum. And, important remnants of a large Gallo-Roman theatre uncovered in early 2007, have been dismantled and stored in accordance with the rules of archaeological conservation, during the redevelopment of the Gare neighborhood in March 2007.
- The Archaeological garden of Saint-Acheul testifies to the presence of Paleolithic man in the Somme Valley some 450,000 years ago. A stratigraphic cut, classified as an historic monument since 1947, allows visualisation of successive strata of the Somme Valley.

===== Architecture from the Middle Ages =====
- The Church of Saint-Germain is disused, but where exhibitions are regularly held on the colourisation of the cathedral and the St-Germain neighborhood, and historical competitor of the Saint-Leu neighborhood. The animosity, between the populations of the two districts has marked the history of Amiens. This church has a high and oddly leaning tower. Affected by the bombing of 1940, it was returned temporarily to worship in October 1965, after a thorough restoration.
- The remains of the Hôtel-Dieu (Saint-Leu district, between the CRDP and the Faculty of Sciences),
- The mills Passe avant and Passe arrière (at Saint-Leu).

===== Architecture from the Renaissance =====
- The renaissance façade of the Maison du Sagittaire (moved to adjoin the Logis du Roy).
- The Logis du Roy (Faculty of Arts until 2003).
- The House of the Bailiwick or Malmaison.
- The Citadelle: First ravelin, erected north of the Montrescu gate, the fortress was located in 1531 by F. di Giorgio on the order of Francis I (Francis I gate, with sculpted salamanders). After the capture by the Spaniards and its takeover by Henry IV (1597), Jean Errard received the charge to rebuild the defences of the city.
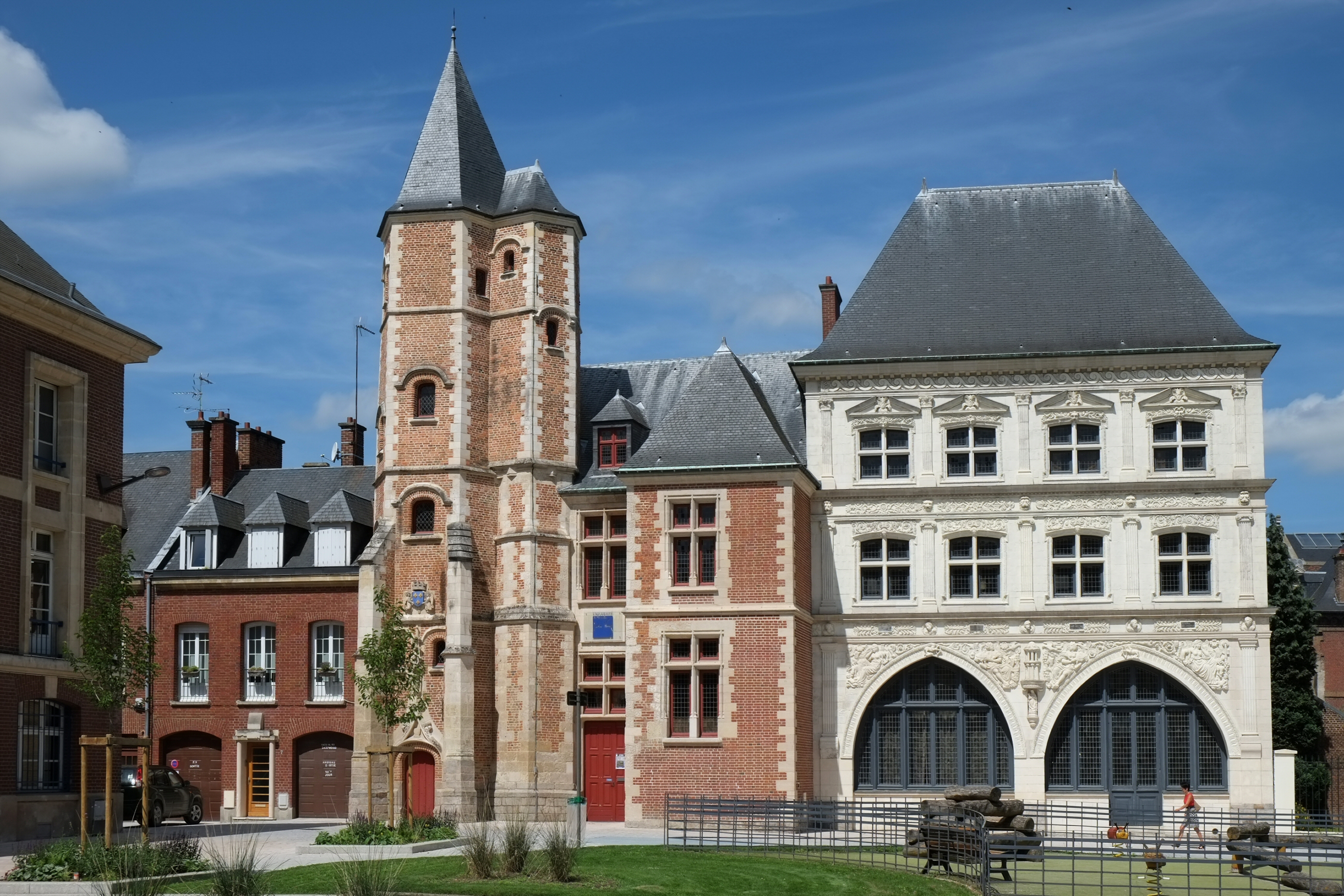
The Logis du Roy and the Maison du Sagittaire.

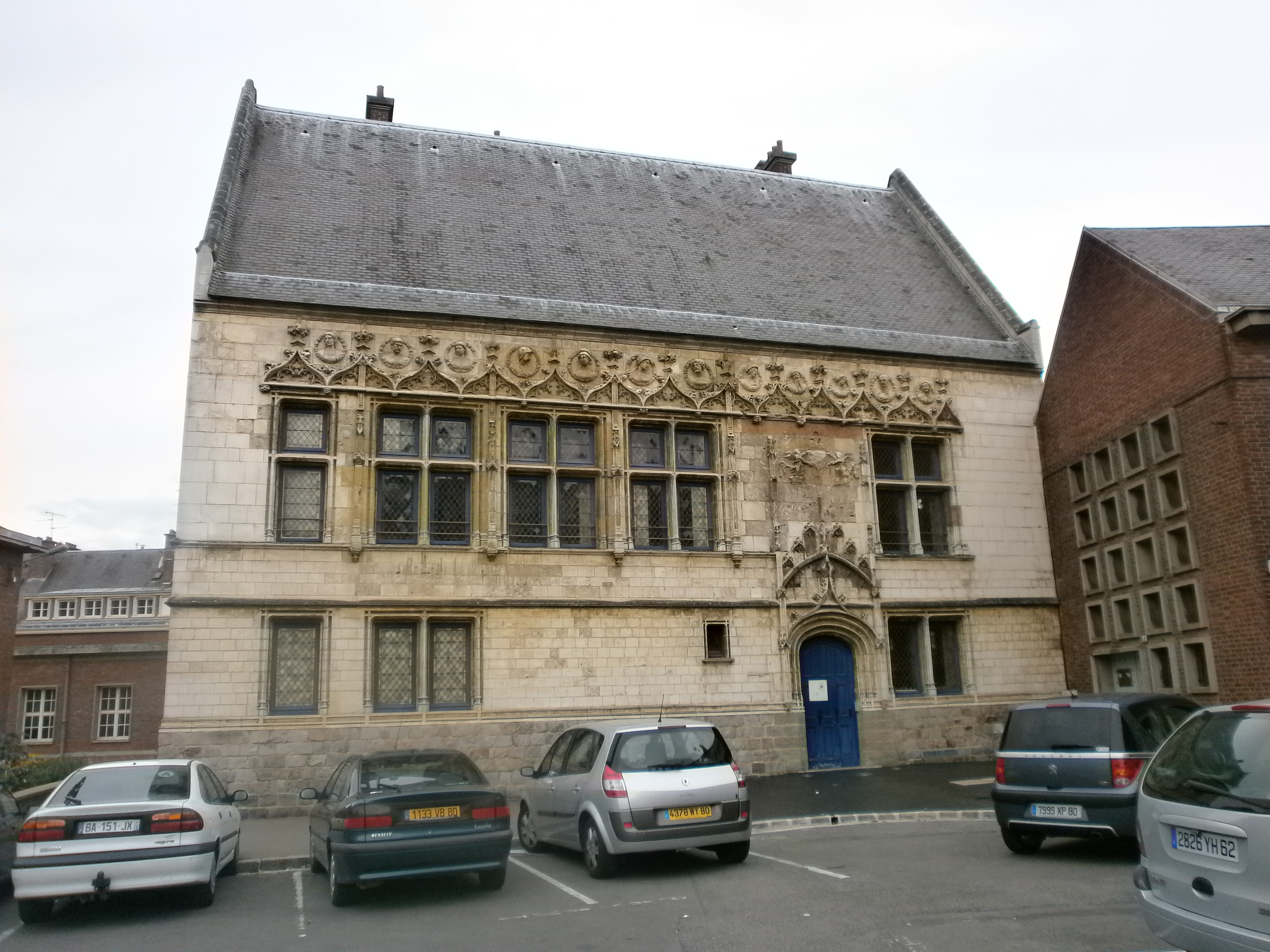
The Maison du bailliage ou Malmaison, former residence of the bailli of Amiens, constructed in 1541.

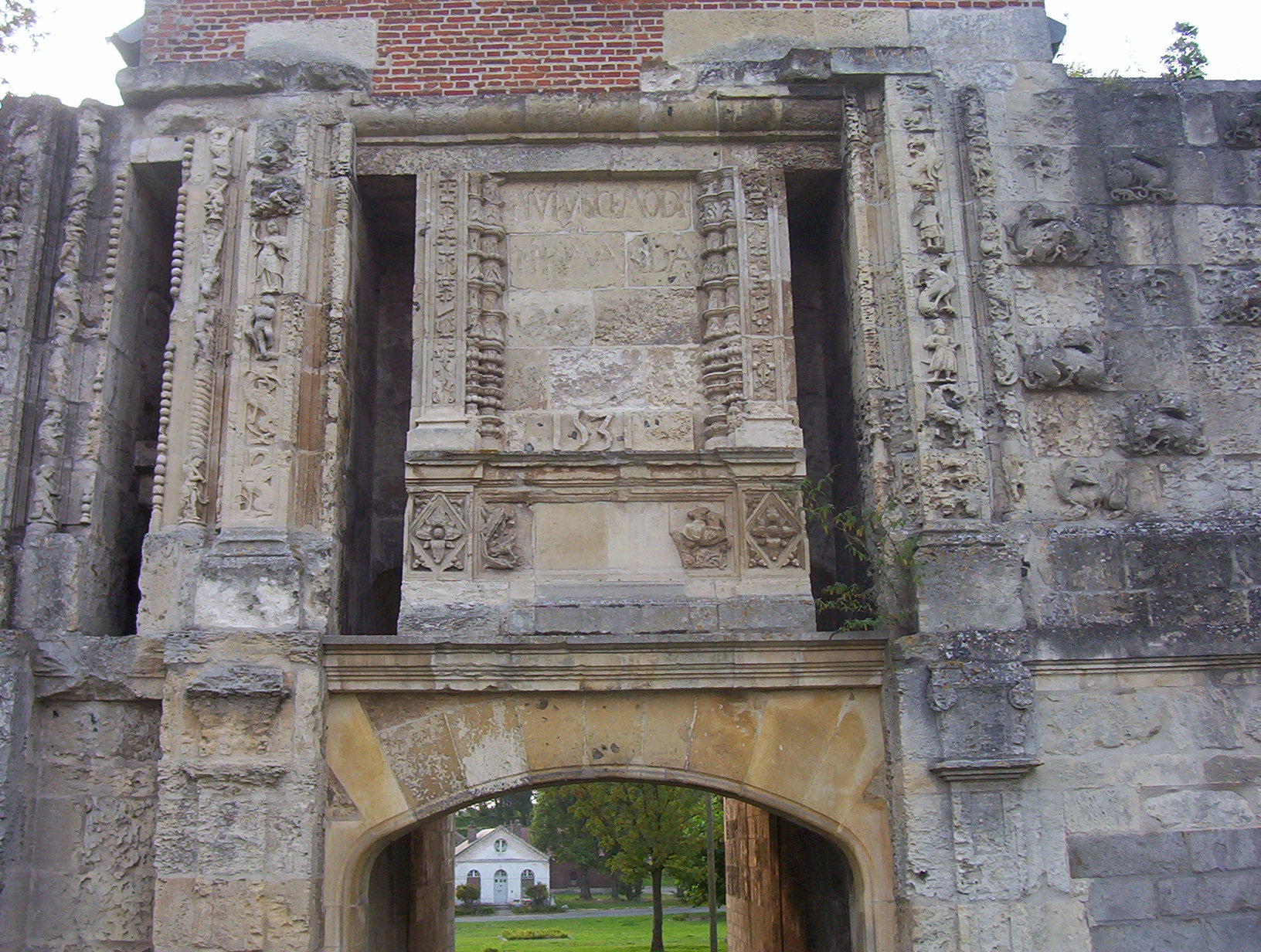
Gate of the Ravelin of Montrescu constructed from 1524 to 1531.

===== Architecture from the 17th and 18th centuries =====
- Abbey of Saint-Jean-des-Prémontrés of Amiens (cloister Dewailly)
- Abbey of Saint-Acheul (17th and 18th centuries) and the Church (built in 1760 on the vault of Fermin of Amiens)
- The water tower and fountains of Amiens (1753)
- The façade of the former theatre (now a bank). It was moved 4 metres (13 ft) to the line of the Rue des Trois-Cailloux.
- The façade of the Stengel barracks (currently an apartment building)
- The Palace of the Bishop of the 17th and 18th centuries.
- The Seminary of the Lazarists: located on Rue Jules-Barni, it was built between 1736 and 1741 and benefitted from several extensions of which the last was built under the aegis of François-Auguste Cheussey in 1828. Seized by the State, following the Act of 1905, the seminary was the barracks office (named after the general assigned to the Committee of fortifications, Pierre Charles Dejean) from 1909 to 1993. During this period, it housed the headquarters of the 8th infantry division.
- The Hôtel de Ville (city hall) (partly 18th century and partly 19th century). Made in the regional style of stone and brick, with bedrock of sandstone, and stone pavilions. On the pediment is found the statues of King Louis VI and Bishop Geoffroi, which granted freedom to Amiens in 1115.
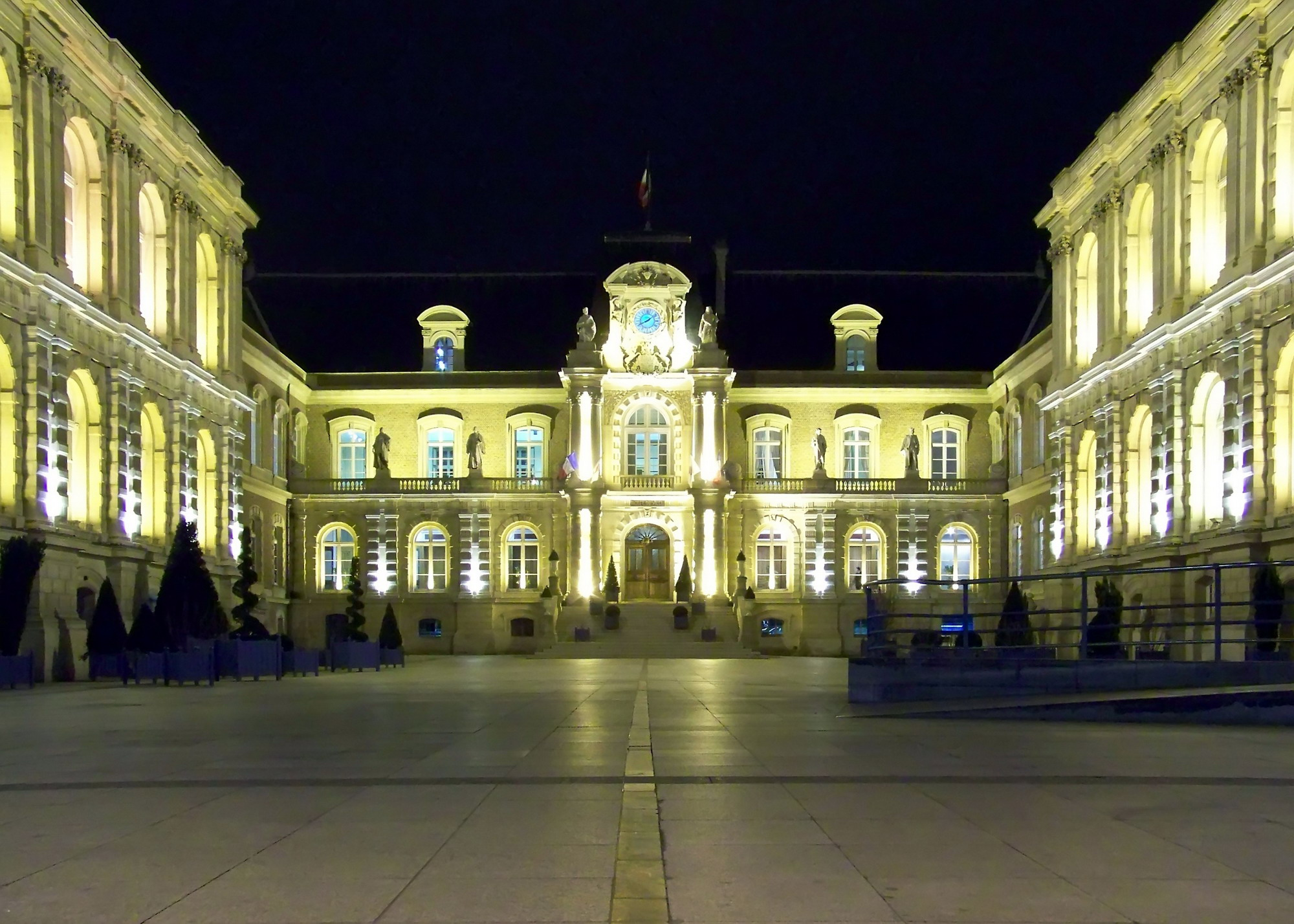
The Hôtel de Ville (city hall)

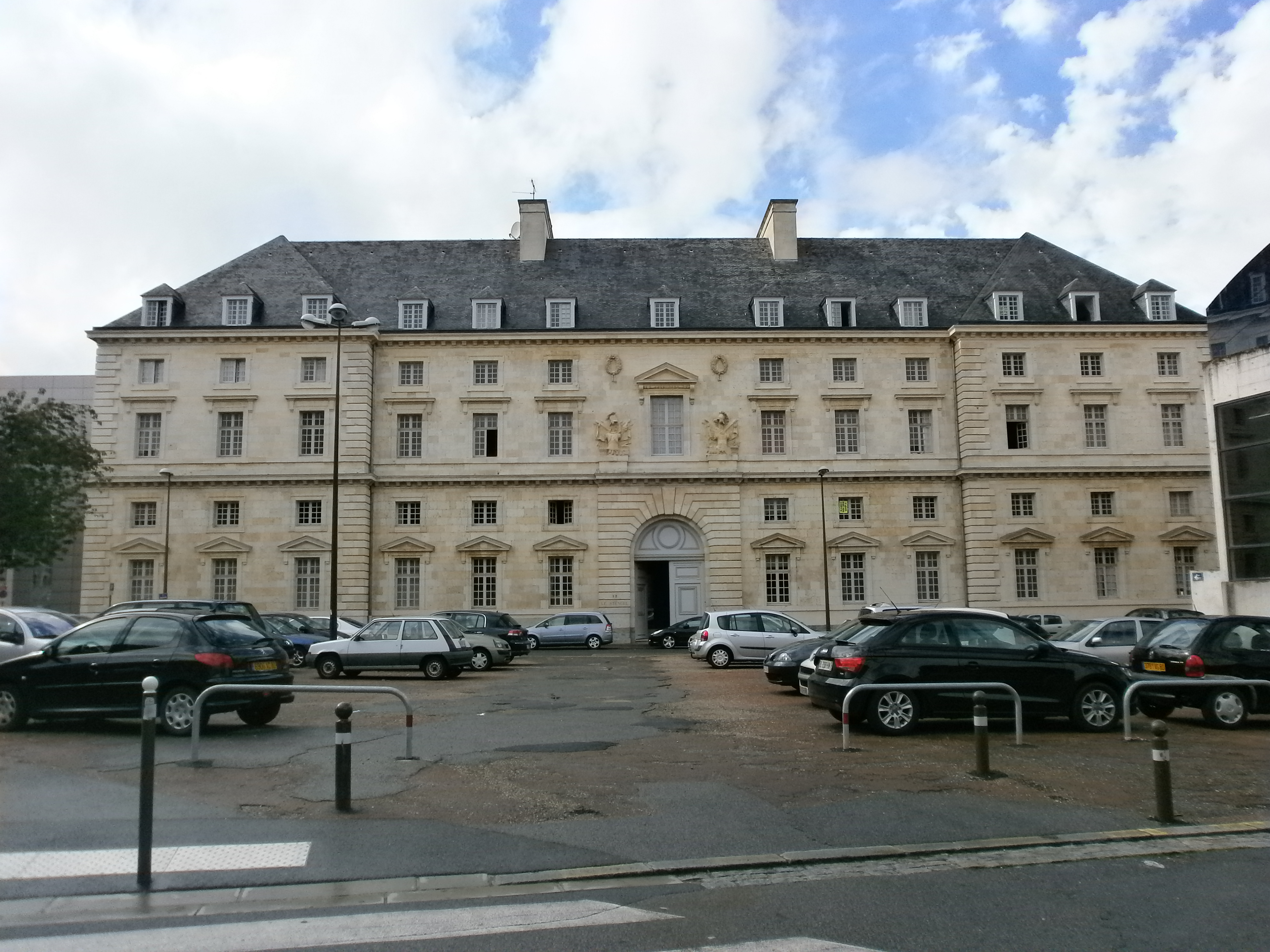
The former Stengel barracks converted into apartments (18th century, historic monuments, 1992).

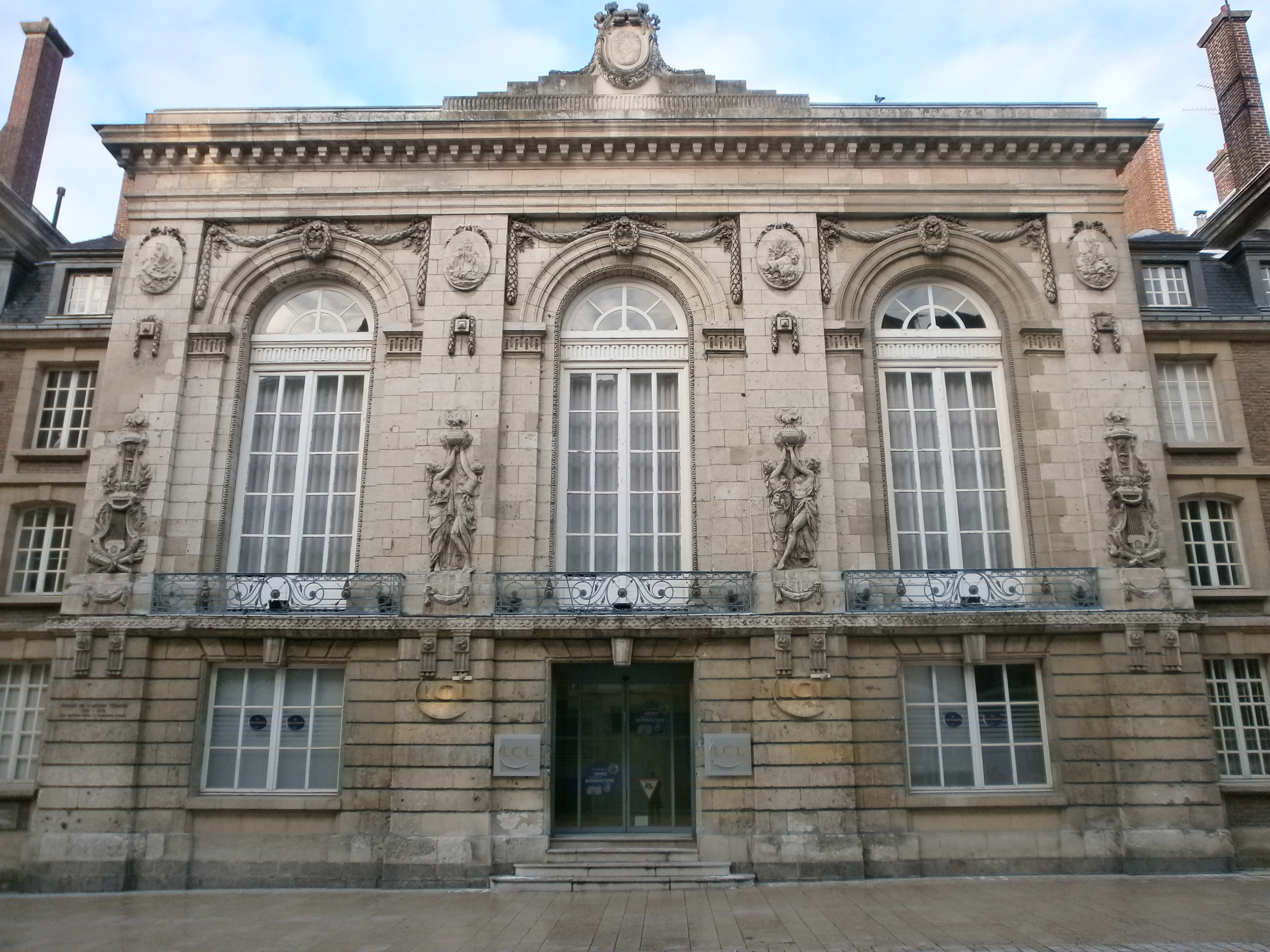
Façade of the former theatre of Amiens, bank Rue des Trois-Cailloux.

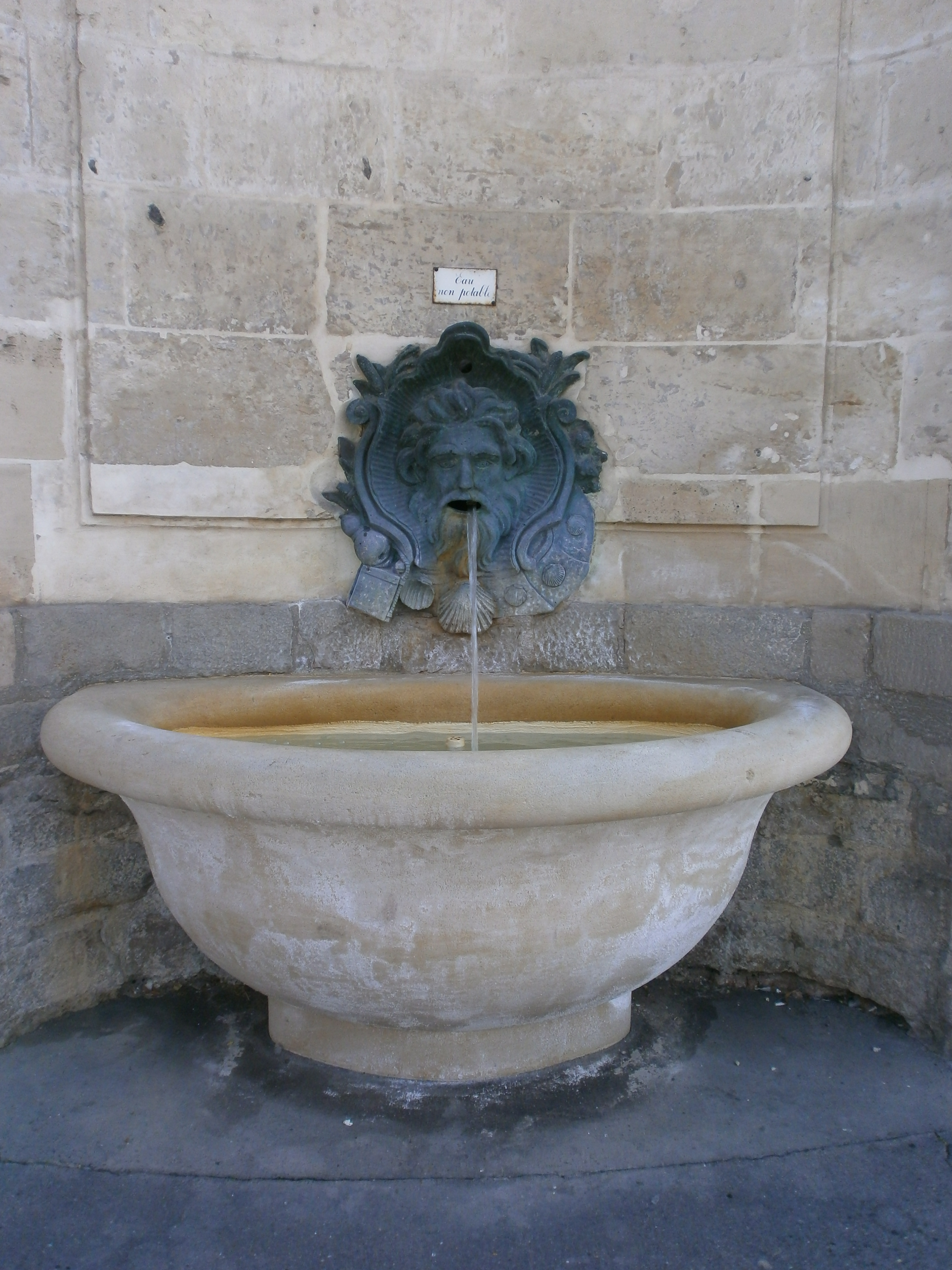
Fountain of Rue Saint-Jacques.

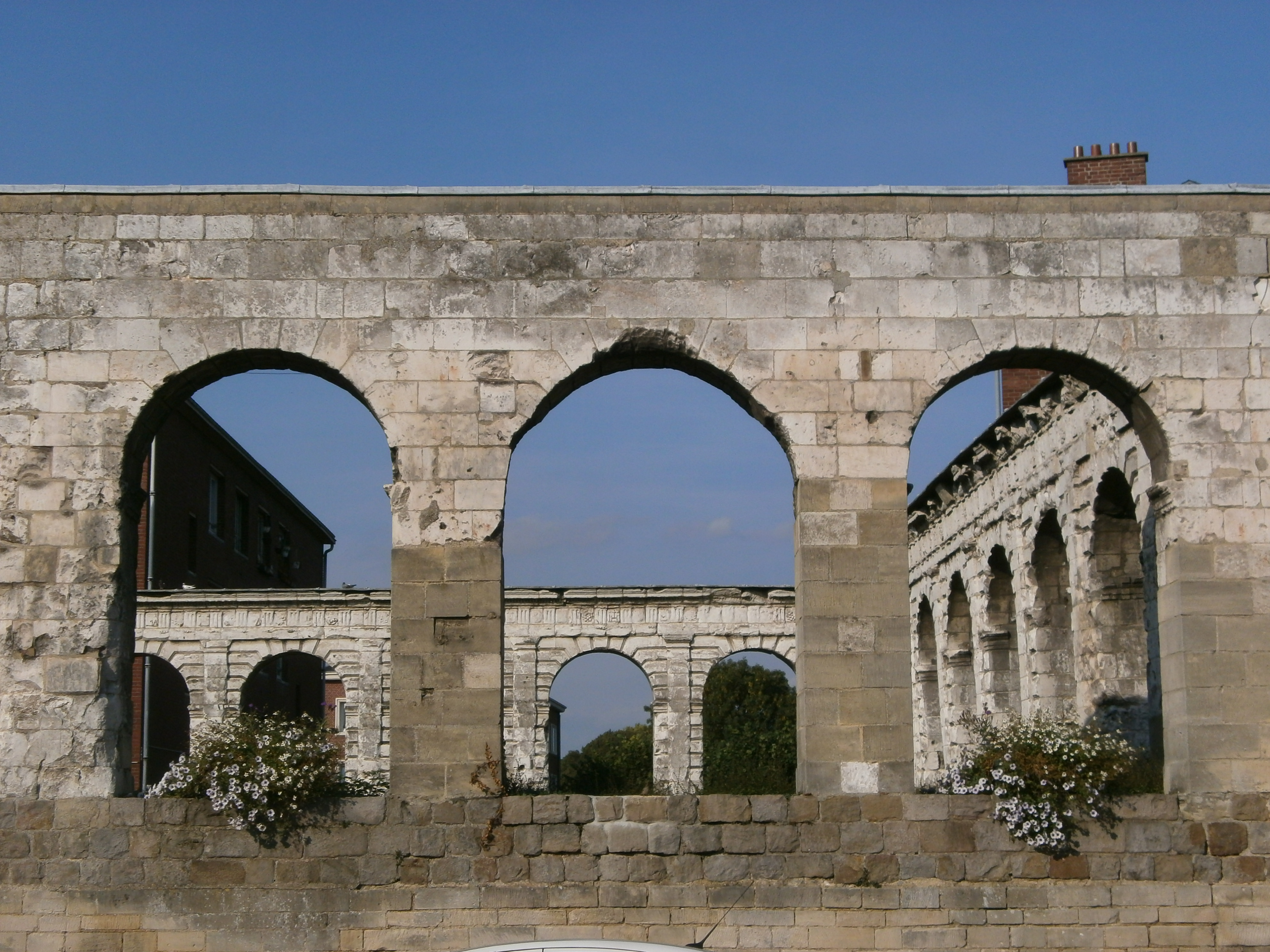
Convent of the grey sisters (18th century, historic monuments, 1992).

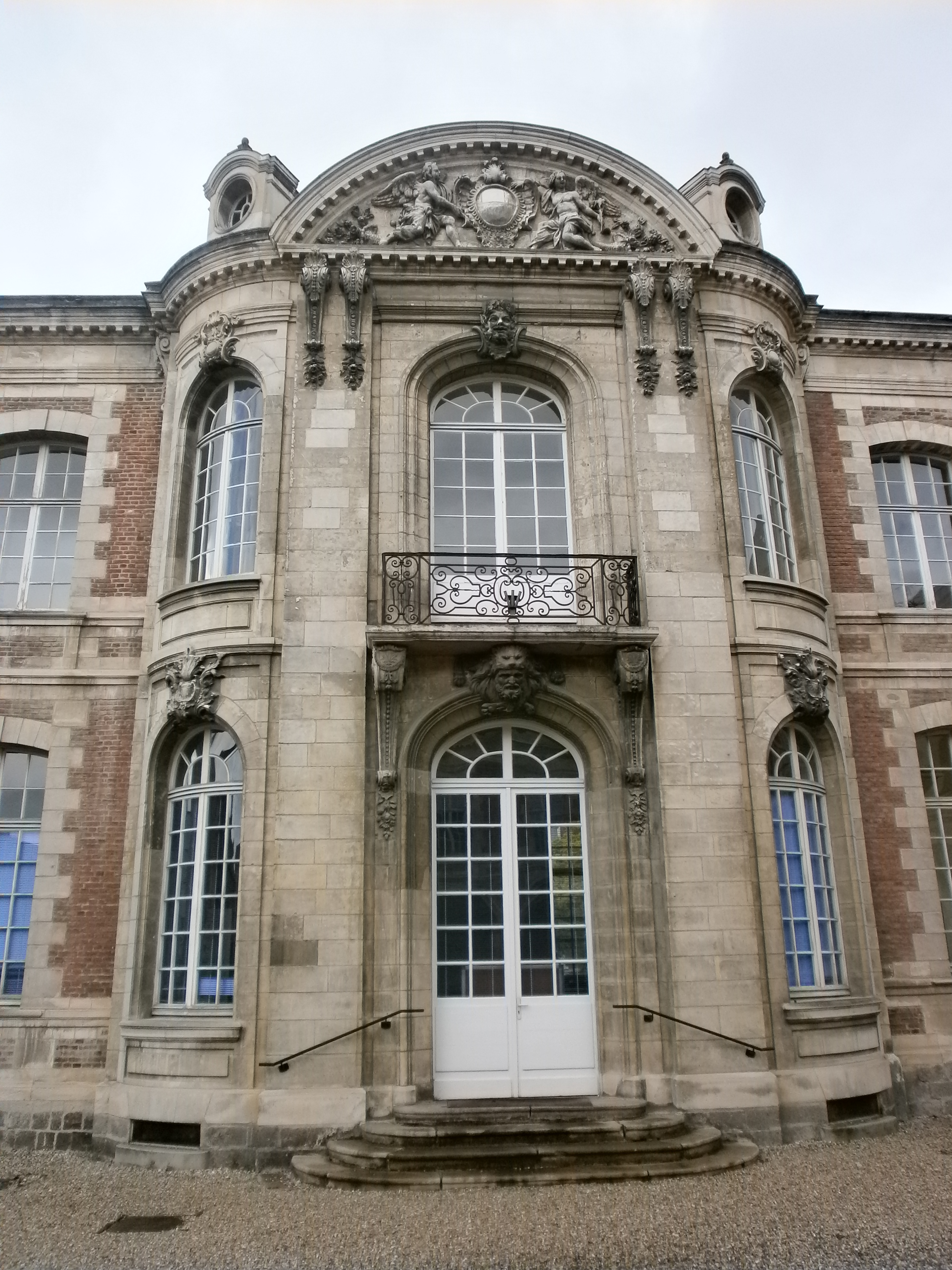
Abbaye Saint-Jean-des-Prémontrés (18th century, historic monuments, 1992).

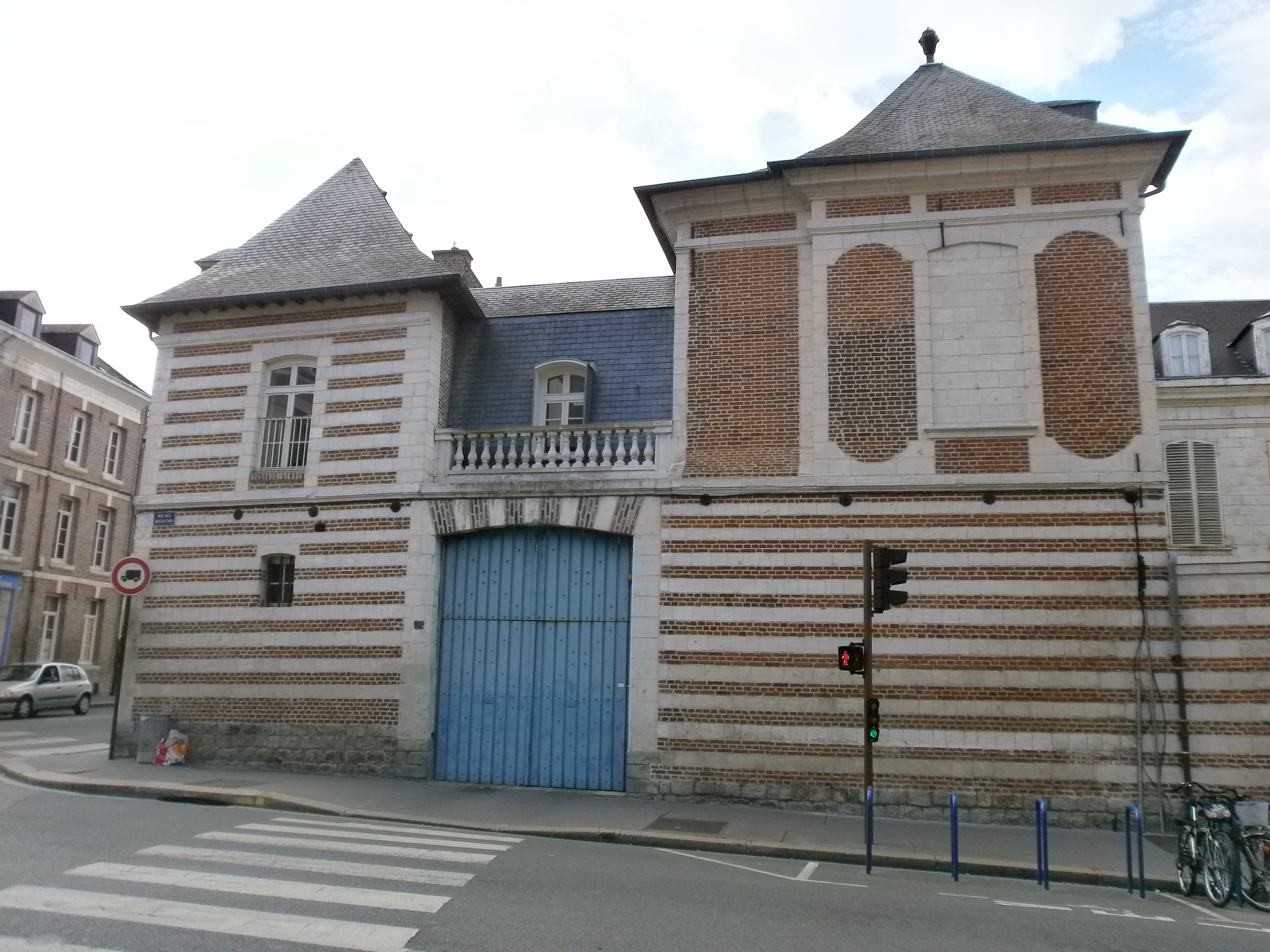
Hôtel Blin de Bourdon (18th century: 1 Rue des Augustins, historic monuments, 1993).

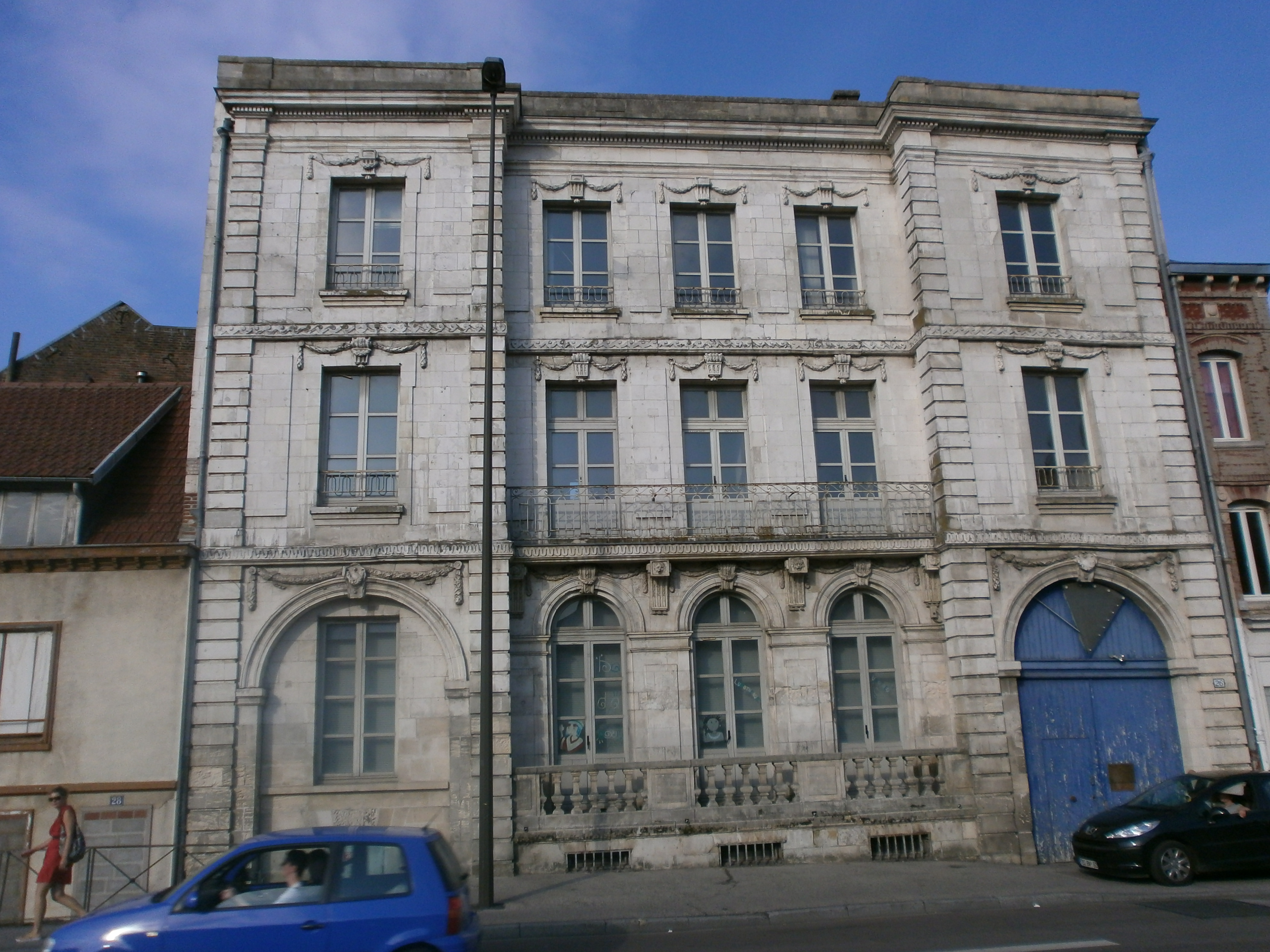
Maison Cozette (18th century) : 26 Place Vogel (historic monuments, 1992).

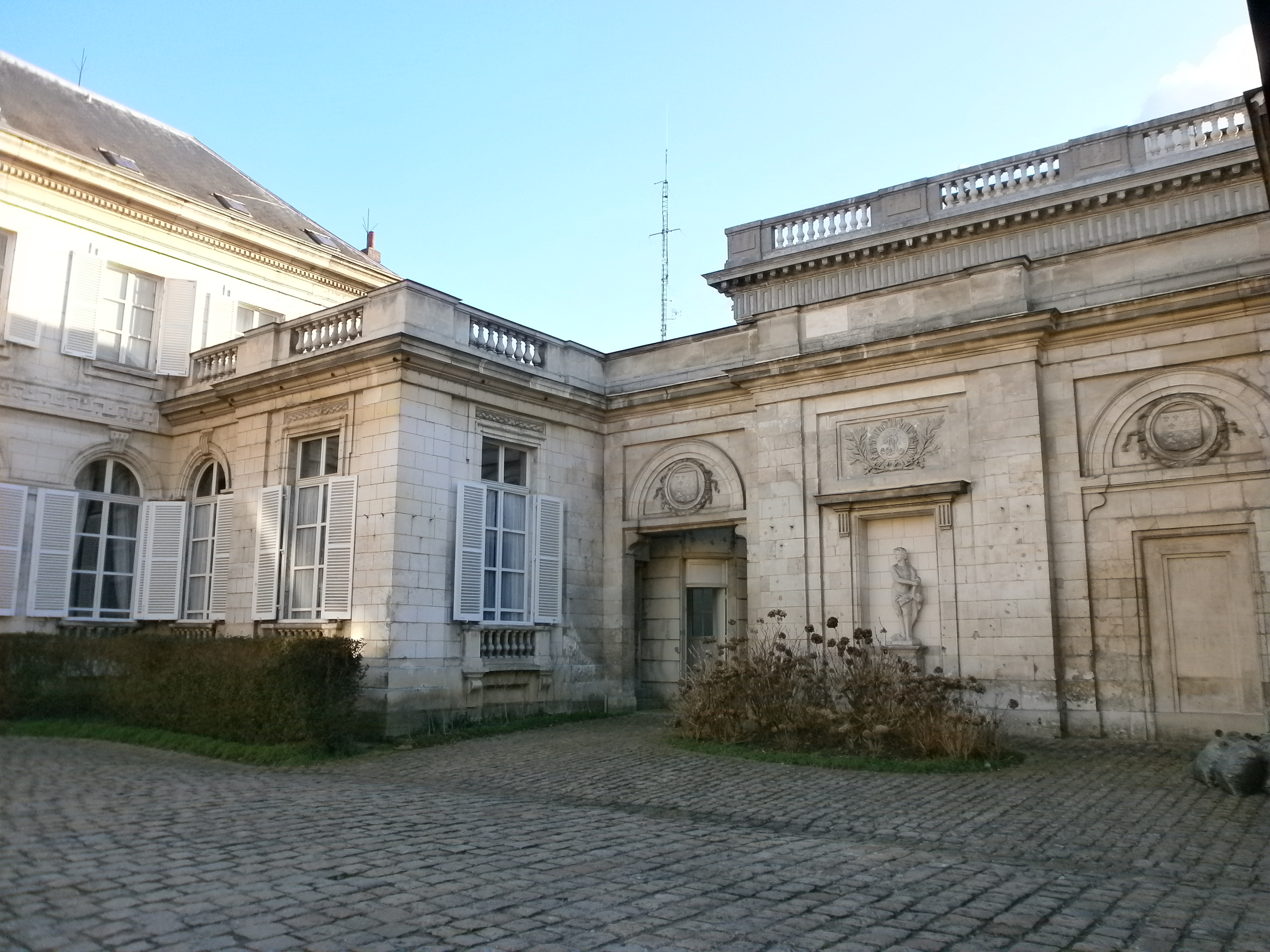
Hôtel de la Préfecture (18th and 19th centuries, historic monuments, 1992).

===== Architecture from the 19th century =====
- The Palace of Justice was built from 1865 to 1880 on the site of the Abbey of Saint-Martin-les-Jumeaux (1073 to 1634) established at the supposed place of the sharing of the cloak of Saint Martin and the convent of the religious Order of the Celestines (1634 to 1781). Les Célestins, whose order was abolished in 1778, left the premises in 1881.
- Henriville neighborhood, including the hotel Acloque (neo-Louis XIII style) and the Saint-Martin Church (neo-Gothic, built by Louis Antoine in 1874).
- The House of Jules Verne, which was reopened after renovation, in 2006, including the present neo-Gothic dining room and antique desk. The tower was covered with an armillary sphere commissioned from artist François Schuiten, who also signed the mural extending the imaginary garden of yesteryear.
- The Cimetière de la Madeleine (Madeleine Cemetery) contains a number of listed monuments including the sculpture on Jules Verne's Tomb. His tomb is decorated with a sculpture by Albert Roze symbolising the resurrection: Jules Verne lifting the slab to glimpse the modern world.
- Saint-Acheul cemetery where various Amiens personalities are buried and where there is a domed tomb with a sculpture by Auguste Rodin.
- The Dewailly clock, by Émile Ricquier (completely redone in 1999), supplemented by the statue of Marie-sans chemise of Albert Roze, originally in the Place Gambetta.
- The former insurance house, Rue Marotte, built by E. Ricquier in 1893 (now a bar).
- The Louis Aragon library, Rue de la République, built by François-Auguste Cheussey in 1823, neoclassical style with a peristyle with columns in Tuscan drums.
- The monastery of the visitation, built between 1839 and 1841 by Herbault.
- The Palace of Justice, new buildings constructed by Cheussey in 1834 and 1846.
- The renovations by Cheussey (1816–1848) of the cathedral.
- Place Saint-Denis (now place René Goblet) is designed in 1839 by the architect François Auguste Cheussey.
- The parish church Saint-Firmin-le-Martyr by Cheussey in 1843.
- The Church of Sainte-Anne of the architect Victor Delefortrie.
- The Church St-Rémi of architect Paul Delefortrie.
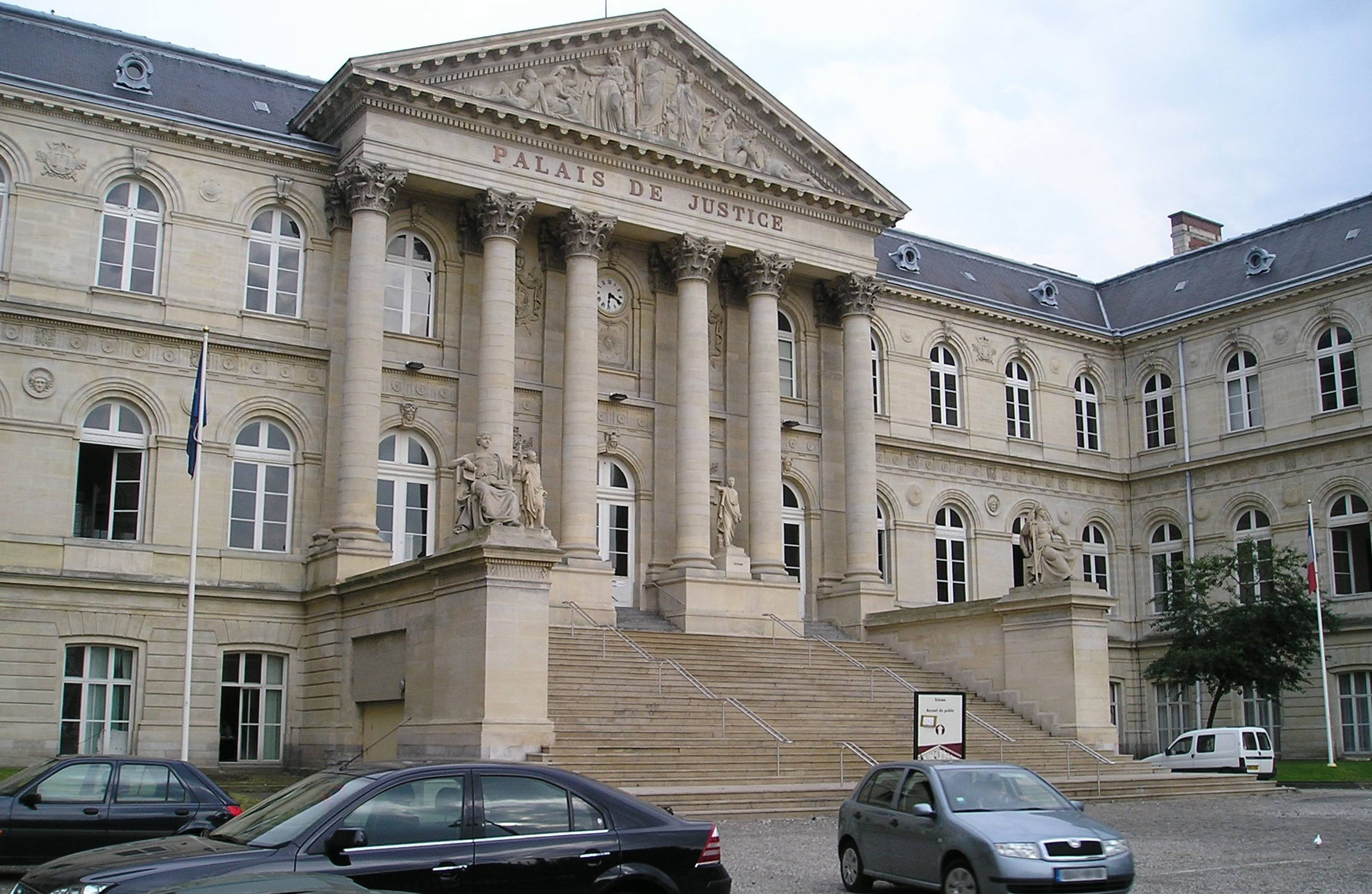
Palace of Justice (19th century, historic monuments).

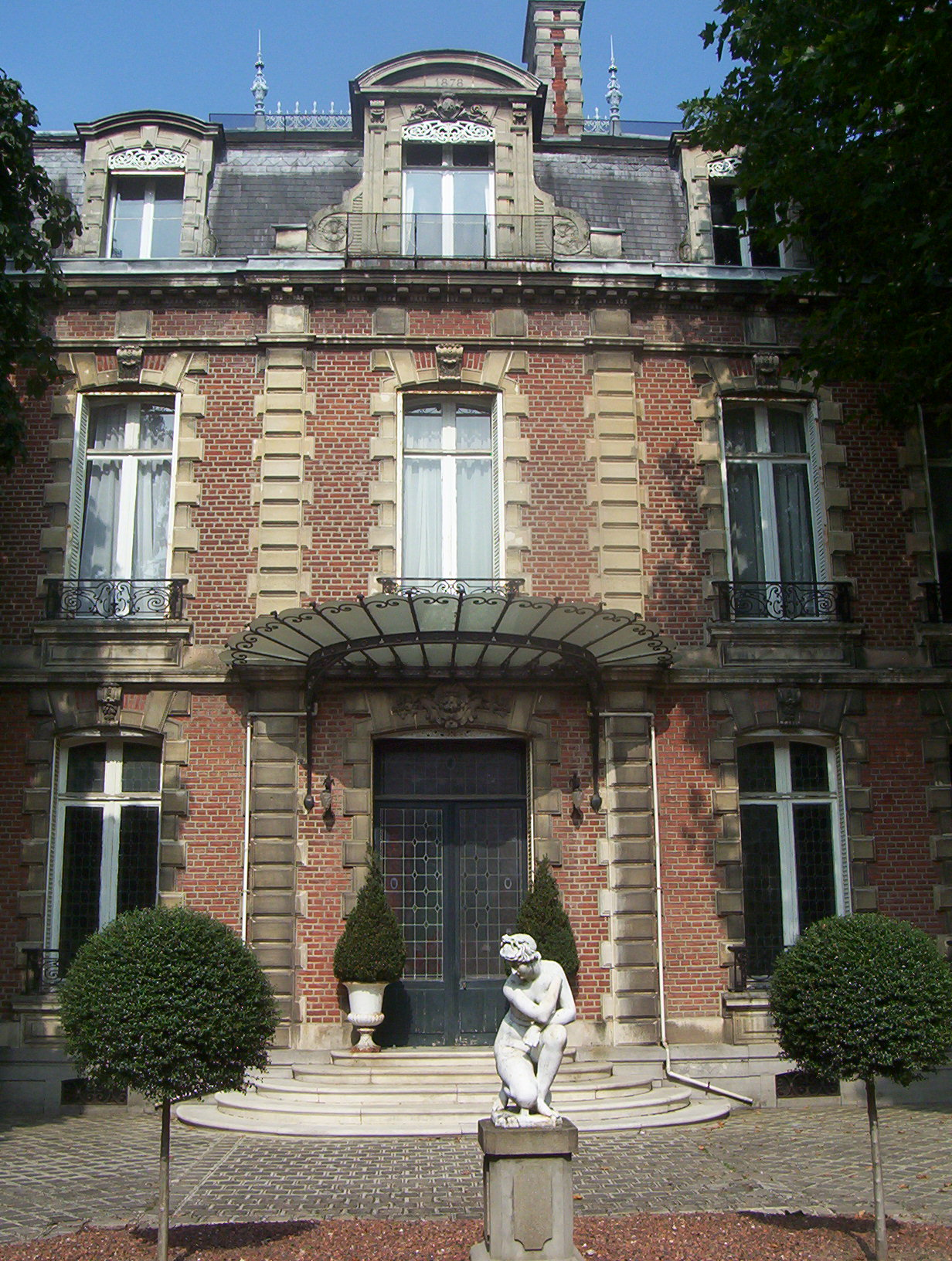
Hôtel Acloque (19th century, historic monuments, 1999).

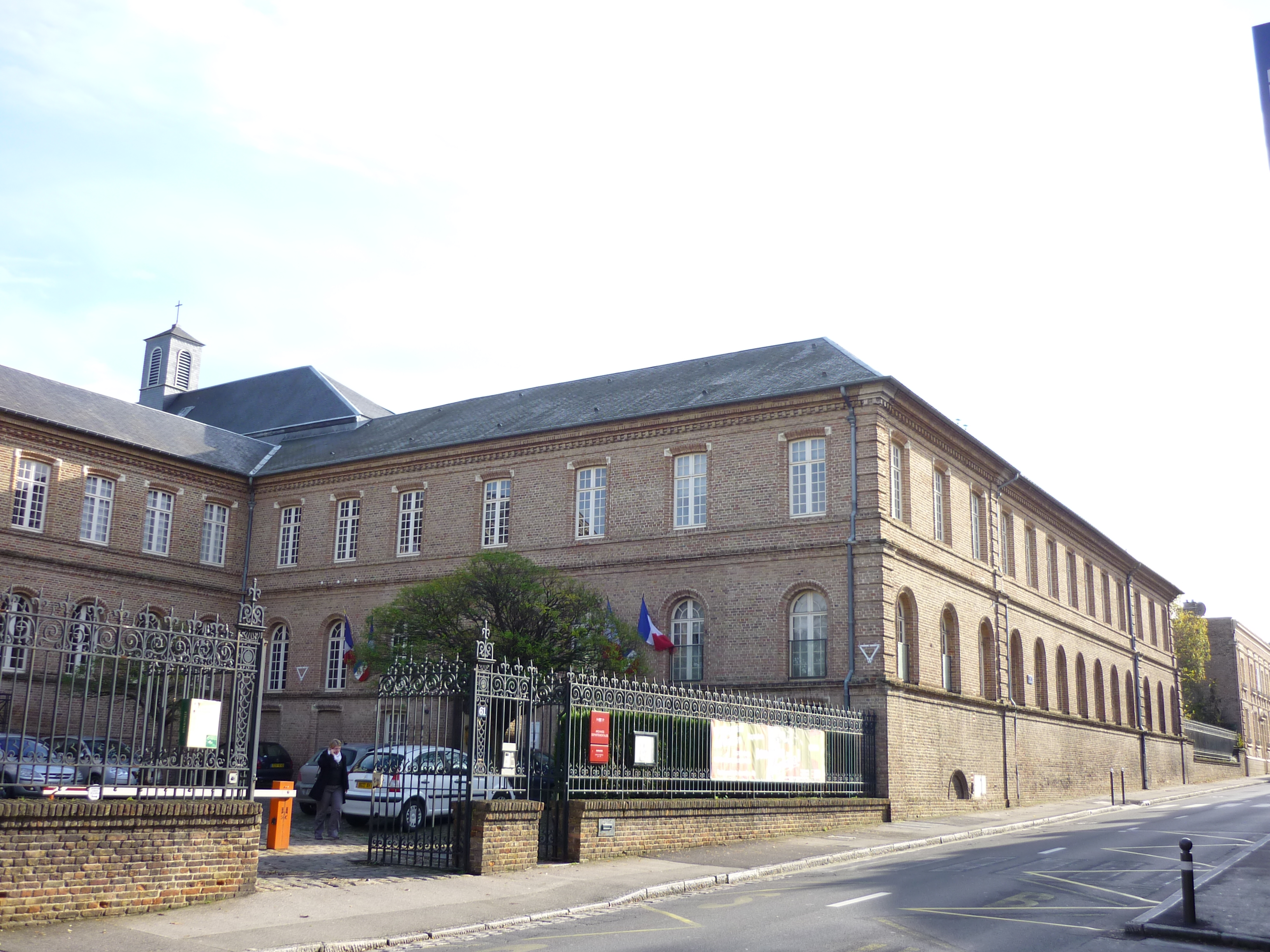
The convent of the Visitation-Sainte-Marie (19th century, historic monuments).

===== Architecture from the 20th century =====
- The hotel Bouctot-Vagniez (seat of the Regional Chamber of commerce and industry), built by Louis Duthoit in 1909, a rare Art Nouveau building in Amiens.
- The English neighborhood, located on the road from Longueau, including a British phone box. An island of London in the heart of Amiens.
- The ESIEE Amiens, designed by the architects Jean Dubus and Jean-Pierre Lott. A modern building identified by its saucer.
- Complex of Art Deco buildings on Rue Cauvin, as well as the Gueudet garages (Rue des Otages).
- Église Saint-Honoré, rebuilt between 1957 and 1961, by Paul Tournon, on the plans of the pontifical pavilion of the universal exhibition in Paris in 1937.
- The hotel Vagniez-Renon (current headquarters of the administrative tribunal): A former residence of Henriville, it houses a Moorish-style hydrotherapy room, designed by Émile Ricquier.
- The Saint-Pierre church, destroyed in 1940 and rebuilt in 1949 by Evrard, in glass and concrete, with a brick bell tower.
- Le Courrier Picard: The headquarters of the daily life of Amiens, first Progrès de la Somme, belongs to a set of Art Deco buildings.
- The monument of Philippe Leclerc de Hauteclocque by Jan and Joël Martel in 1950.
- The Carmel of the Holy Spirit, on the Montjoie Hill, built in 1965 by architect Pierre Pinsard.
- The House of culture of Amiens, inaugurated on 19 March 1966 by André Malraux, built by Jean Duthilleul.
- The Coliséum, inaugurated on 5 January 1996, built by the architect Pierre Parat (designer of the Palais omnisports de Paris-Bercy).
- The Stade de la Licorne, built in 1999 by architects Philippe Chaix and Jean-Paul Morel.

===== Architecture from the 21st century =====
- The Cinema Gaumont Amiens opened in 2005. It is the work of architects Philippe Chaix and Jean-Paul Morel. The interior decoration is the work of Christian Lacroix and artists Alain Balzac and François Michel.
- The Verrière de la place de la gare d'Amiens, also called the Canopy. It is the work of architect Claude Vasconi, known especially for the Forum des Halles in Paris. A subject of a controversy when it opened in March 2008, the canopy is designed to create a link between the pedestrian zone of the city center and the ZAC Gare la Vallée, and to become a business district of Amiens. Criticised for its massive and imposing area of more than 10,000 square metres (110,000 sq ft), the canopy rises to 15 metres (49 ft) in height and is composed of pixellated glass panels created by Bernard Pictet. This is one of the largest canopies in Europe.
- The Zenith of Amiens by Massimiliano Fuksas, in the Renancourt neighborhood between the Mégacité and the Hippodrome. Construction was completed in 2008.

=== Environmental heritage ===
Amiens has 270 hectares (670 acres) of green space (excluding communal woodland) 118,300 hectares (292,000 acres) of hortillonnages, 300 hectares (740 acres) of forests, 30 hectares (74 acres) of marshland, in addition to its river and its streams.

Floral City awarded the maximum score of 4 flowers in the floral contest of cities and villages of France to Amiens, and it offers a particularly rich wooded heritage. With 38,650 trees (excluding woodland), of which 17,000 are situated on highways, Amiens to win the national tree award. In 2014, the city ranked in the top 10 greenest cities of France.

Presenting itself as a city concerned with the environment, Amiens has made the link between the city and nature a central axis of its metropolitan development project called Amiens 2030.

==== The hortillonages ====
Amiens is also known for the hortillonnages, gardens on small islands in over 300 hectares (740 acres) of marshland between the River Somme and River Avre, surrounded by a grid network of human-made canals (locally known as "rieux"). They are also known as the "floating gardens of Amiens". The hortillonnages are sometimes called "Little Venice of the North", because of the canals.

Hortillon means market garden in Picard, and derives from the Latin hortillus, small garden. It is navigated in flat bottom boats, formerly called barque à cornet [Cornet boat], due to the very raised front, which allows the boats to easily dock on the fragile shores of the cultivated fields. It is the upstream port, located at the foot of the cathedral, where a weekly market is held on the water, although the arrival the growers by boat can only be accomplished once a year, in summer.

==== Amiens Metropolitan Zoo ====
Prior to its opening in May 1952, the Amiens Zoo is a green space bordering the basin of the Park of the Hotoie. It was the mayor of the time, Maurice Vast, who decided to develop the site in 1949. Originally intended as an entertainment venue, the zoo began its mission of conservation, education and research between 1970 and 1980. Between 1990 and 2000, the zoo was completely renovated and became a permanent member of the European Association of Zoos and Aquaria (EAZA) in 2001 and the National Association of Zoological Parks (ANPZ) in 2002. Today, there are 300 animals, representing approximately 75 species from all continents, cohabiting on 6.5 hectares (16 acres). They live in environments, which are close to their natural environment, favouring their well-being. In 2014, the zoo received 161,128 visitors. Traditionally, entry is free on 14 July, Bastille Day.

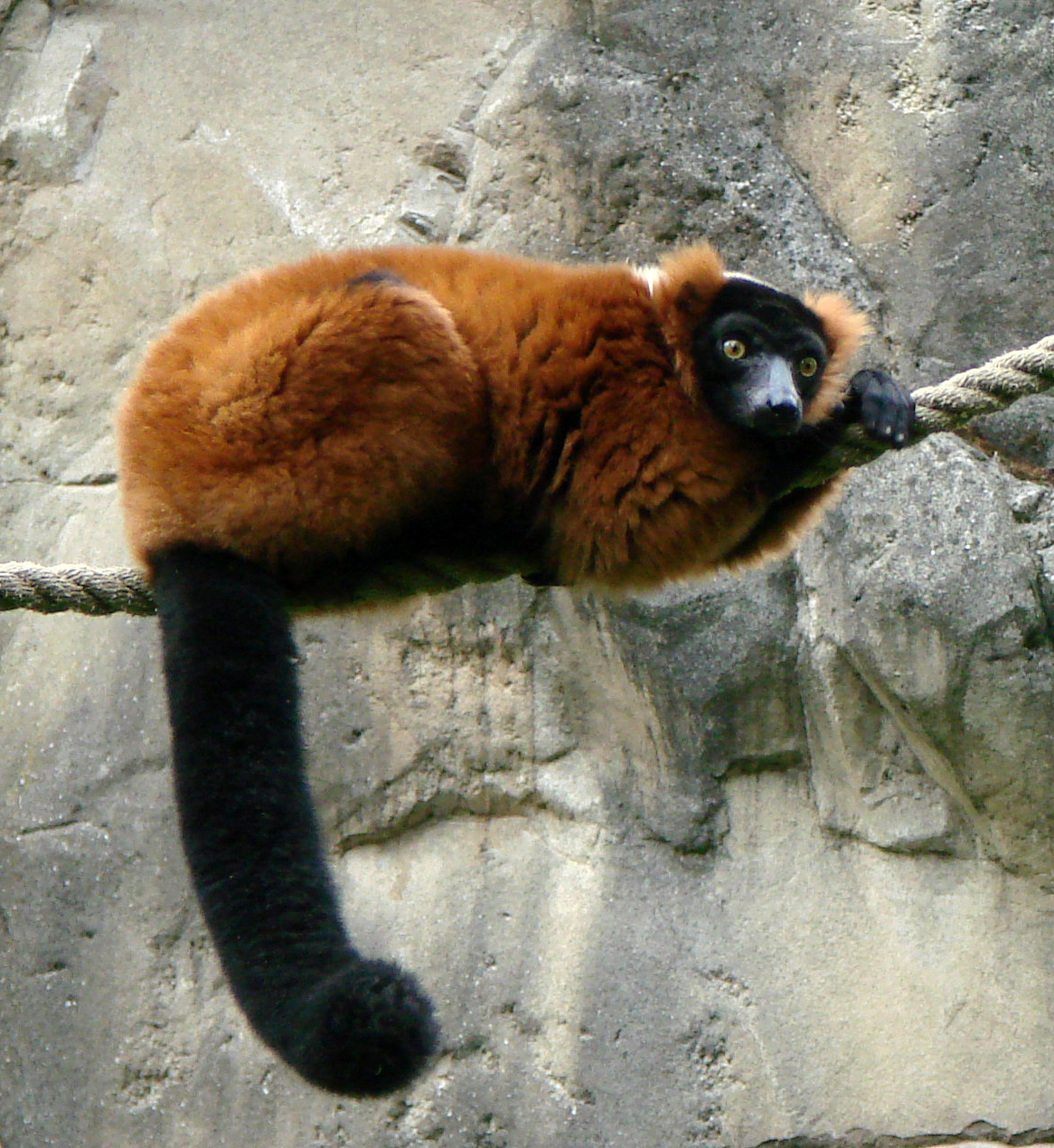
Red ruffed lemur (Varecia rubra)

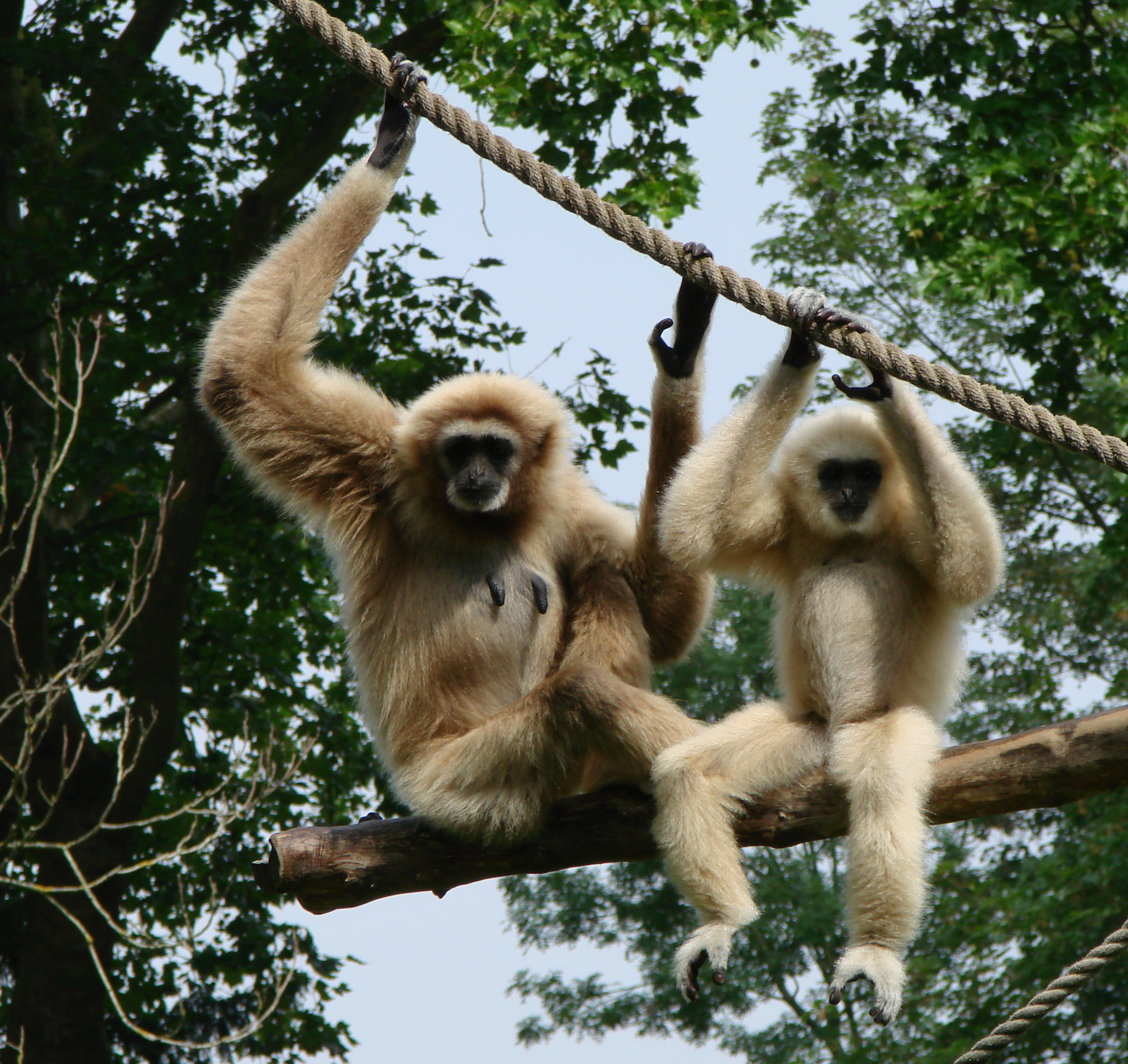
Lar gibbons (Hylobates lar)

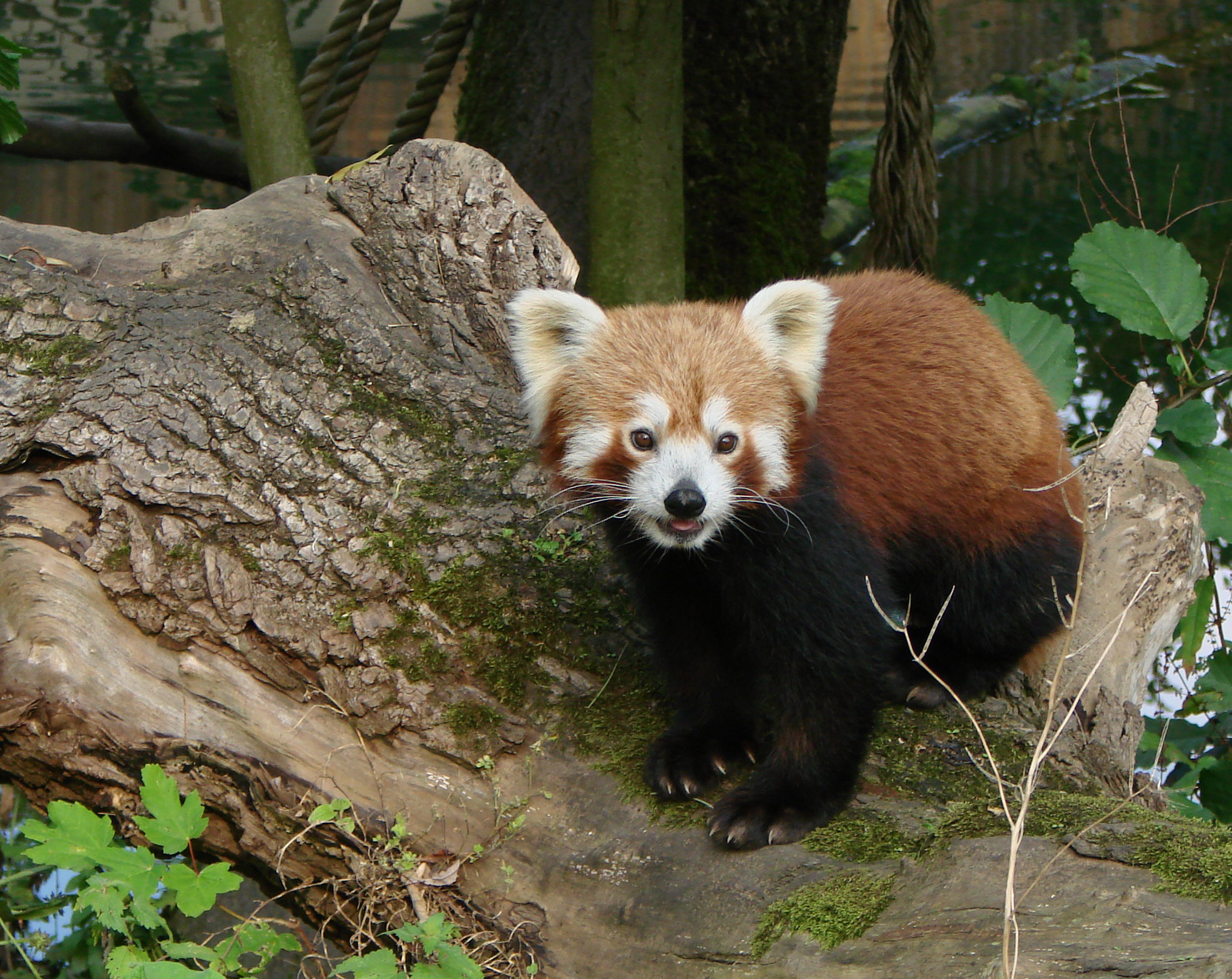
Red panda (Ailurus fulgens)

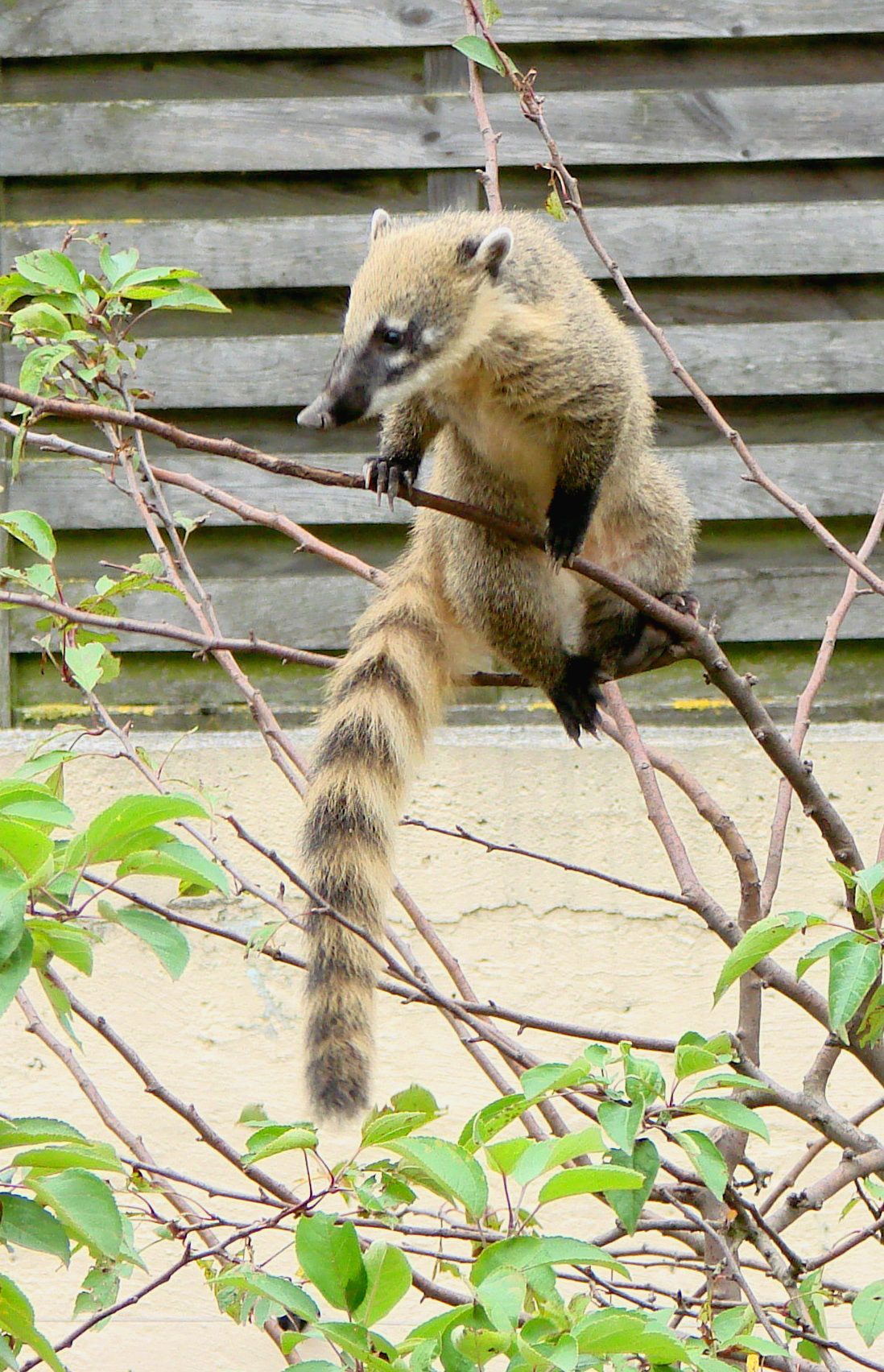
South American coati (Nasua nasua).

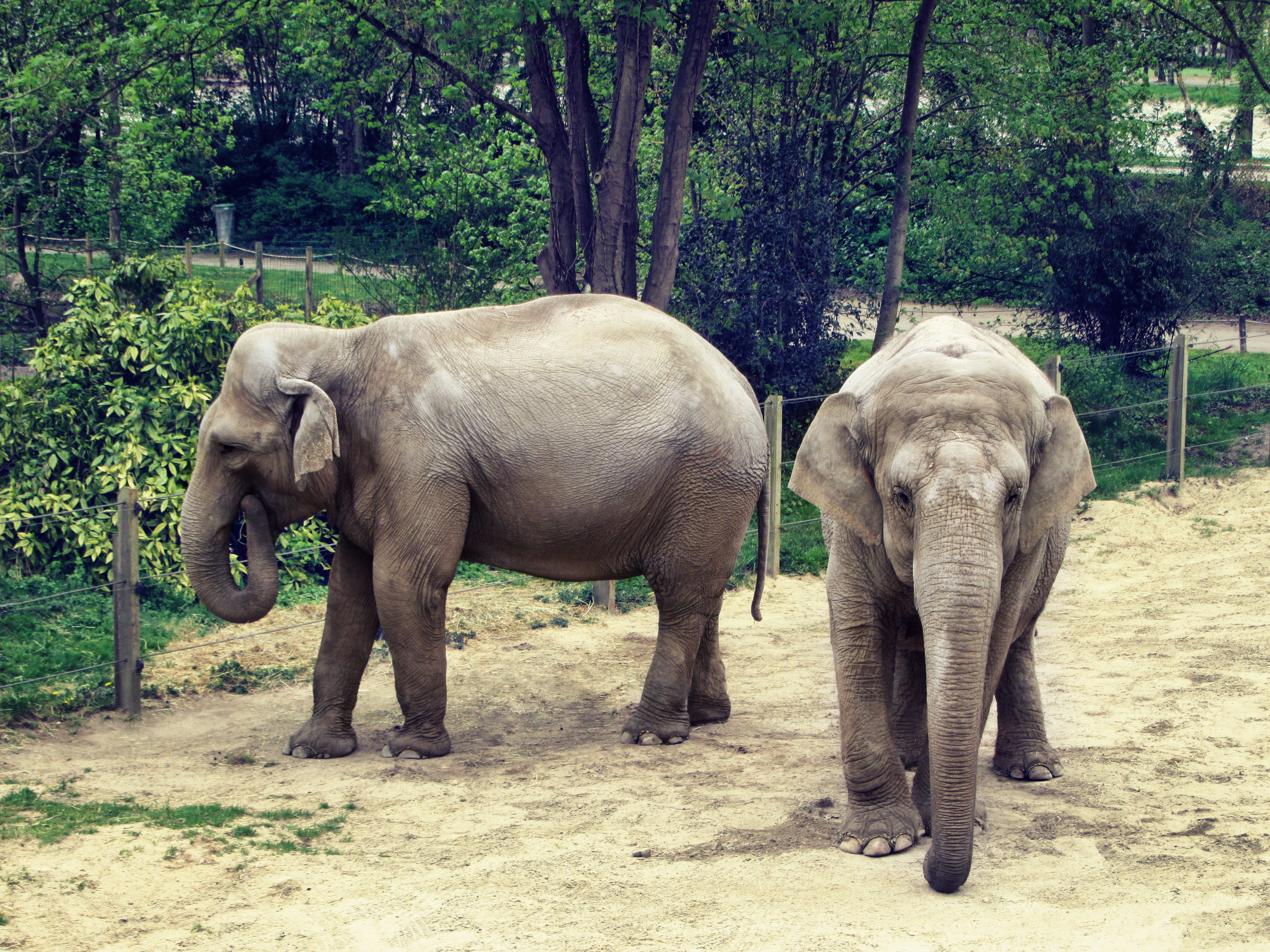
Jena and Praya, the two Asian elephants (Elephas maximus).

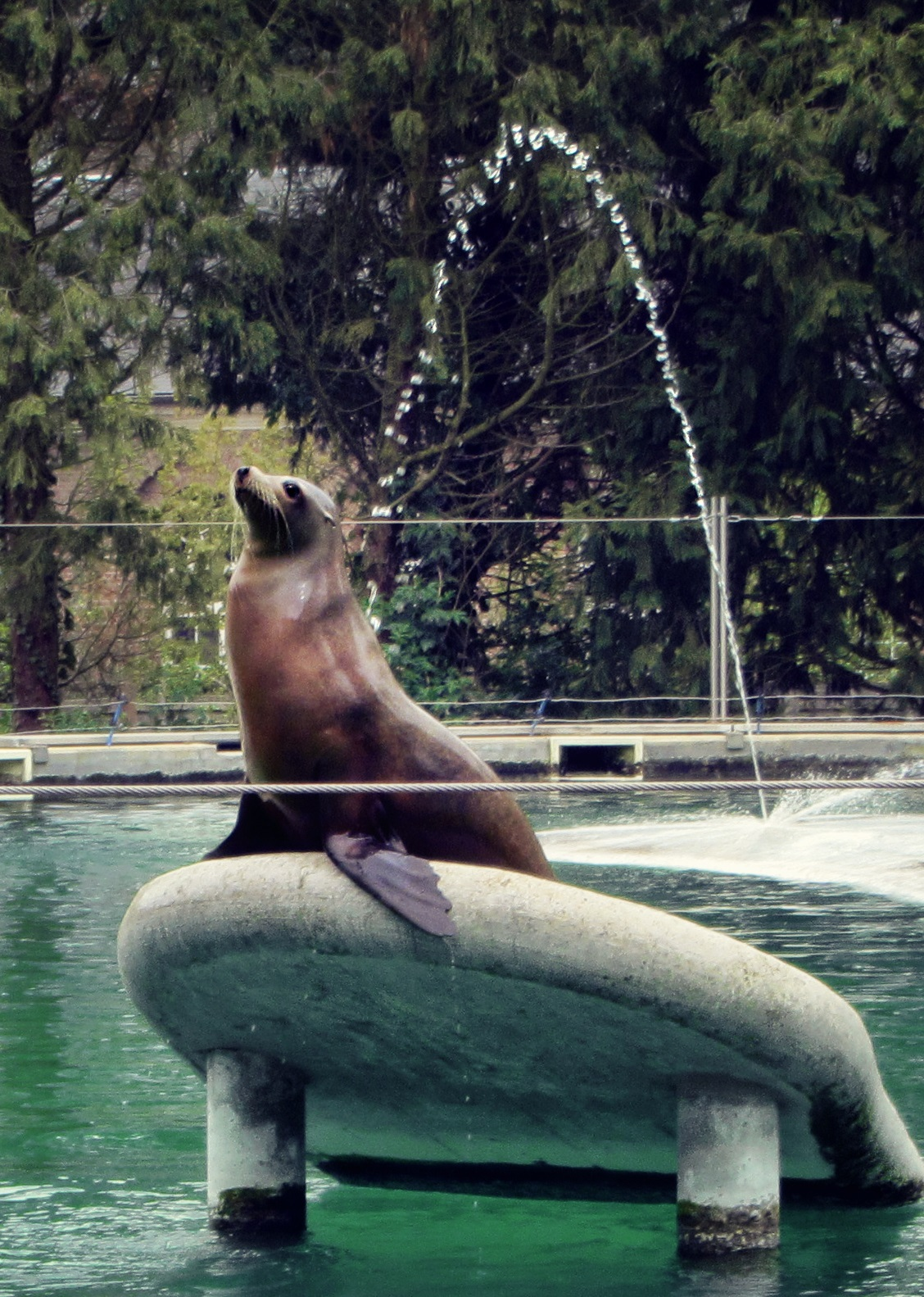
California sea lion (Zalophus californianus)

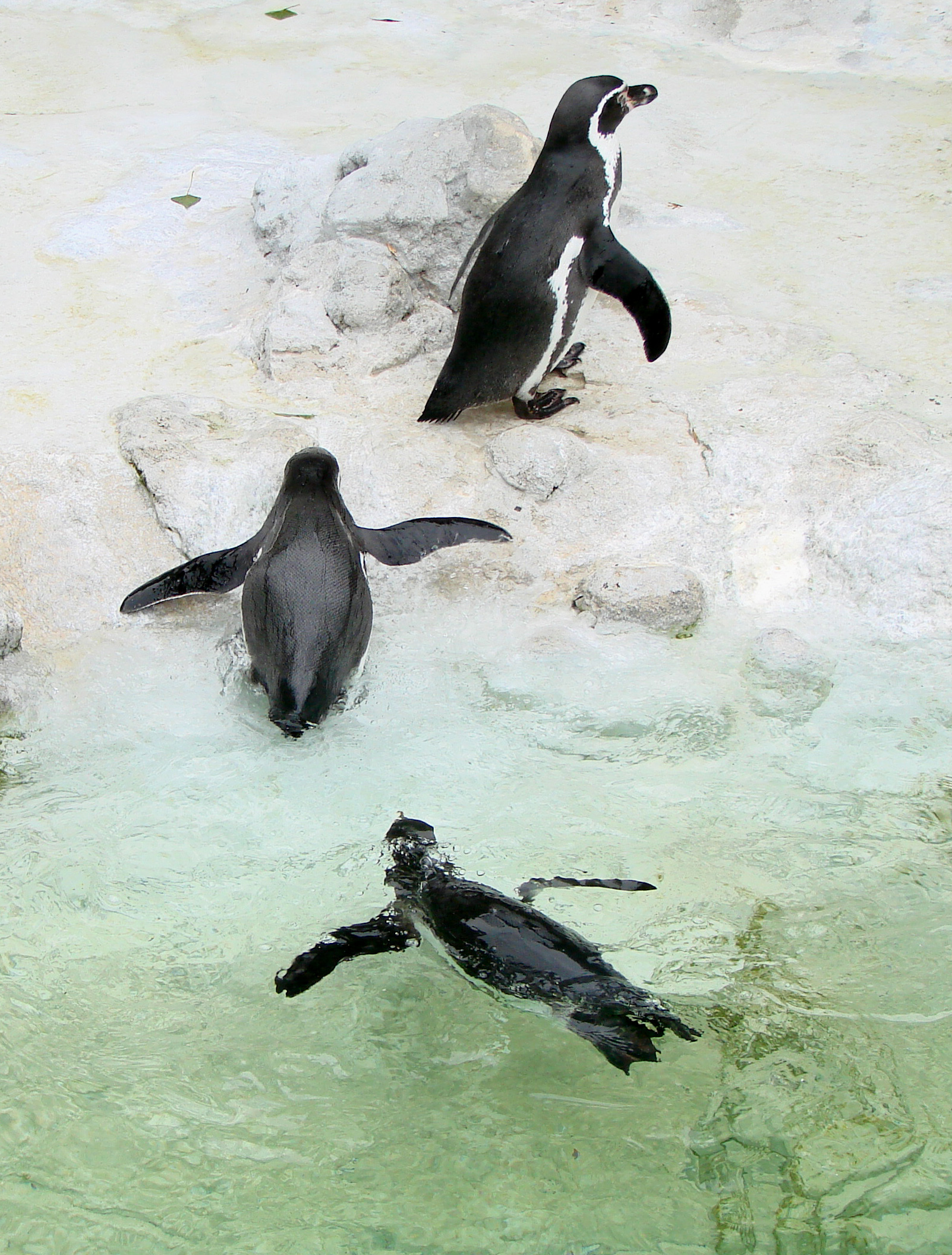
Humboldt penguins (Spheniscus humboldti)

==== The main parks and gardens ====
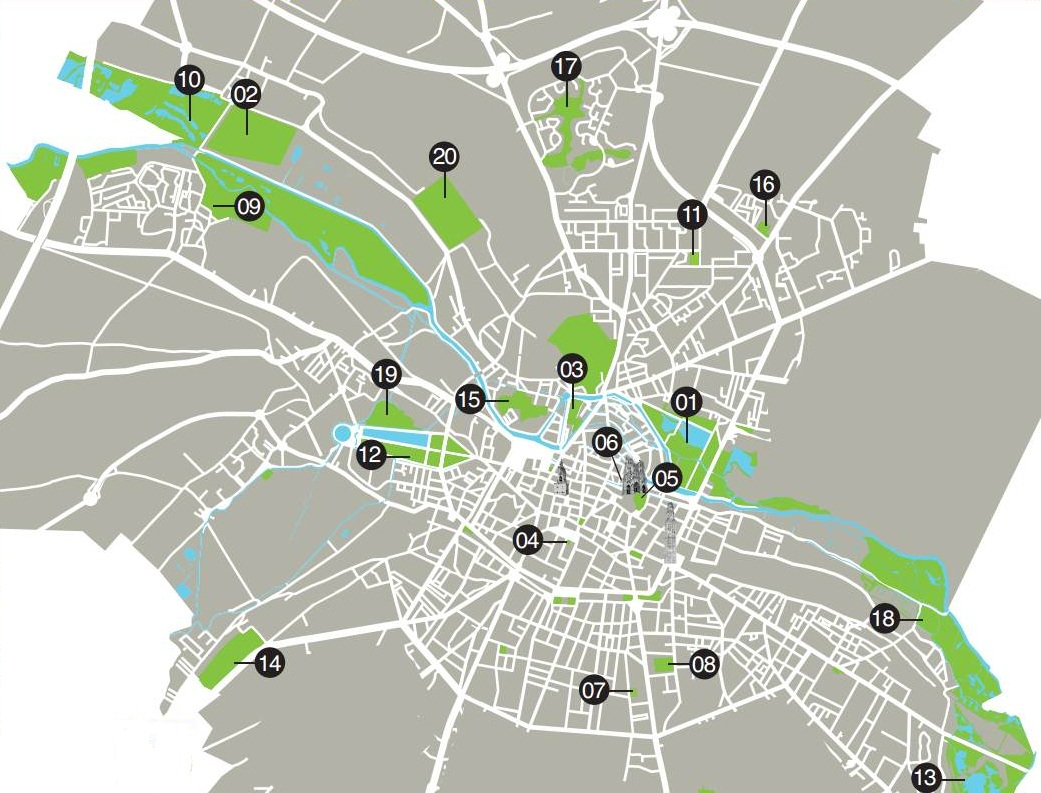
The principal parks and gardens in the city.

1. Parc Saint-Pierre, between the Saint-Leu neighborhood and the hortillonnages, a 22 hectares (54 acres) park in the heart of the city, which was awarded the Prix du paysage in 2005.
2. Parc du Grand Marais, along the Somme Canal, to the west of the city. Covering over 25 hectares (62 acres), this park has many sports facilities: American football stadium, skate bowl, football field, play structures.
3. Jardin des plantes originally called the Jardin du Roy. Created in 1751, it is the oldest garden of Amiens on the Boulevard du jardin des plantes.
4. Square Pierre Marie Saquez on Rue des Cordeliers
5. Parc de l'Évêché d'Amiens, at the foot of the cathedral on Place Saint-Michel
6. Jardin médiéval on Impasse Joron
7. Square Beauregard on Rue Louis Thuillier
8. Parc Jean Rostand on Rue Vulfran Warmé
9. Parc du Château de Montières on Rue Baudoin d'Ailly
10. Parc du Petit Marais on the Avenue des cygnes
11. Square Paul Gauguin on the Avenue de la paix
12. Parc de la Hotoie
13. Marais des trois vaches
14. Parc du Château blanc, on the Route de Rouen
15. Bois Bonvallet
16. Square de la rose des vents on Rue du Docteur Fafet
17. Plaine Saint Ladre
18. Parc Léon Pille on Rue de l'Agrappin
19. Zoo d'Amiens on the Esplanade de la Hotoie
20. Cimetière de la Madeleine, on Rue Saint Maurice
21. Le Square Saint-Denis
22. Square Montplaisir, on Place Joffre
23. Square Aimé Césaire, on Boulevard de Belfort
24. Clos Alexandre, jardin floral et paysager privé
25. Cimetière Saint-Acheul, on Rue de Cagny
26. Jardin archéologique de Saint-Acheul, on Rue de Boutillerie

As a floral city, 4 flowers were awarded in 2013 by the National Council of Cities and Villages of France for the competition of floral cities and villages. The national Council of Cities and Villages awarded the 2012 National Tree Prize to the city for "its exceptional and innovative management of its wooded heritage" with its 37,000 trees, some more than a century old.

=== Cultural heritage ===
==== Museums ====
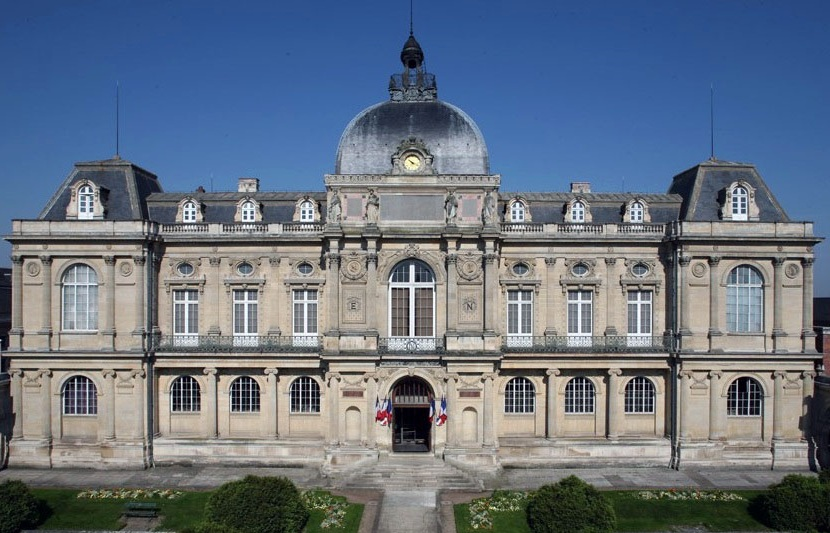
Musée de Picardie

- The Musée de Picardie is a key site in the history of the National Museum, since it is the first building to have been built in France to serve as a museum. Built under the Second Empire on the model of the new Louvre of Napoleon III, it opened its doors to the public in 1867 after the visit of the emperor. Considered the French model of a 19th-century museum, it was nicknamed the "Little Louvre of the Province". It hosted very early rich collections which are now divided into four departments: Archaeology in the basement, the Medieval art on the ground floor, fine arts on the ground floor and the first floor, and modern and contemporary art on the first floor. Rooms are also devoted to temporary exhibitions. The department of fine arts brings together paintings by Van Dyck, Jordaens, Ruysdael, El Greco, Ribera, Tiepolo, Guardi, Fragonard, Chardin, Boucher, Quentin de La Tour, Vouet, Corot and Courbet. The modern and contemporary collection is represented by Picasso, Picabia, Balthus, Dubuffet, Hélion, Bacon, Miró and Manessier. Access to the picture galleries of the first floor is by a mounumental staircase in a setting dedicated to the famous wall compositions of Pierre Puvis de Chavannes.

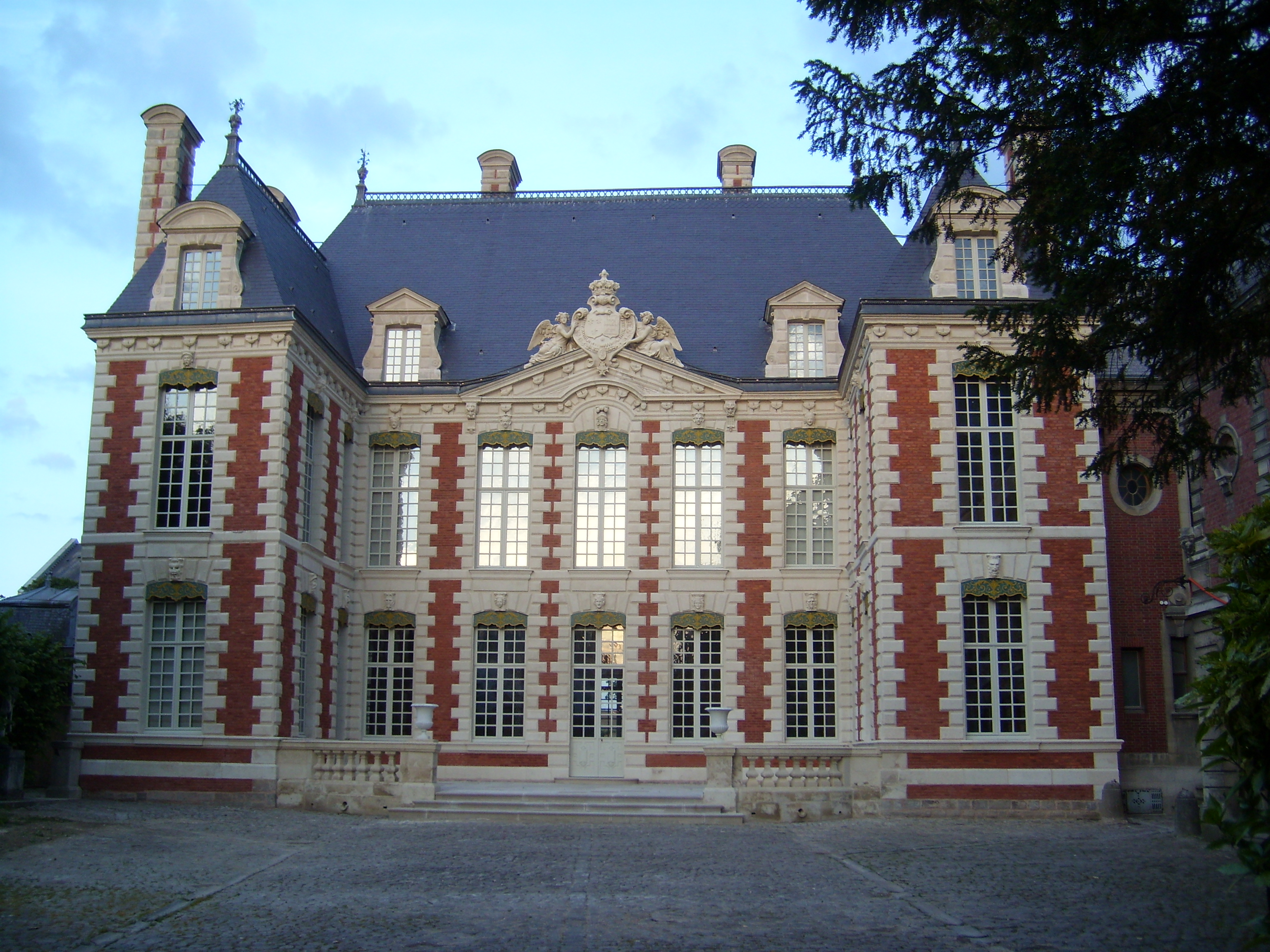
Musée de l'Hôtel de Berny

- The Hotel de Berny Museum is a regional museum of local art and history. This building, typical of the Louis XIII architecture, was built in 1634 as a mansion of the treasurers of France. Property of Gérard de Berny, Senator of the Somme in the first half of the 20th century, has restored the façades and settled its collections. Located a few metres from the cathedral, this Museum of France retains an exceptional collection of woodwork, furniture and objets d'art (tapestries, ceramics, ironworks) and memories (objects and arrays) of Amiens personalities: Jules Verne, Choderlos de Laclos, Édouard Branly, Jean-Baptiste Gresset, Vincent Voiture, Joseph Pinchon, Maréchal Leclerc. The museum is currently undergoing a complete renovation of its buildings and an overhaul of the installation of its museum collections.

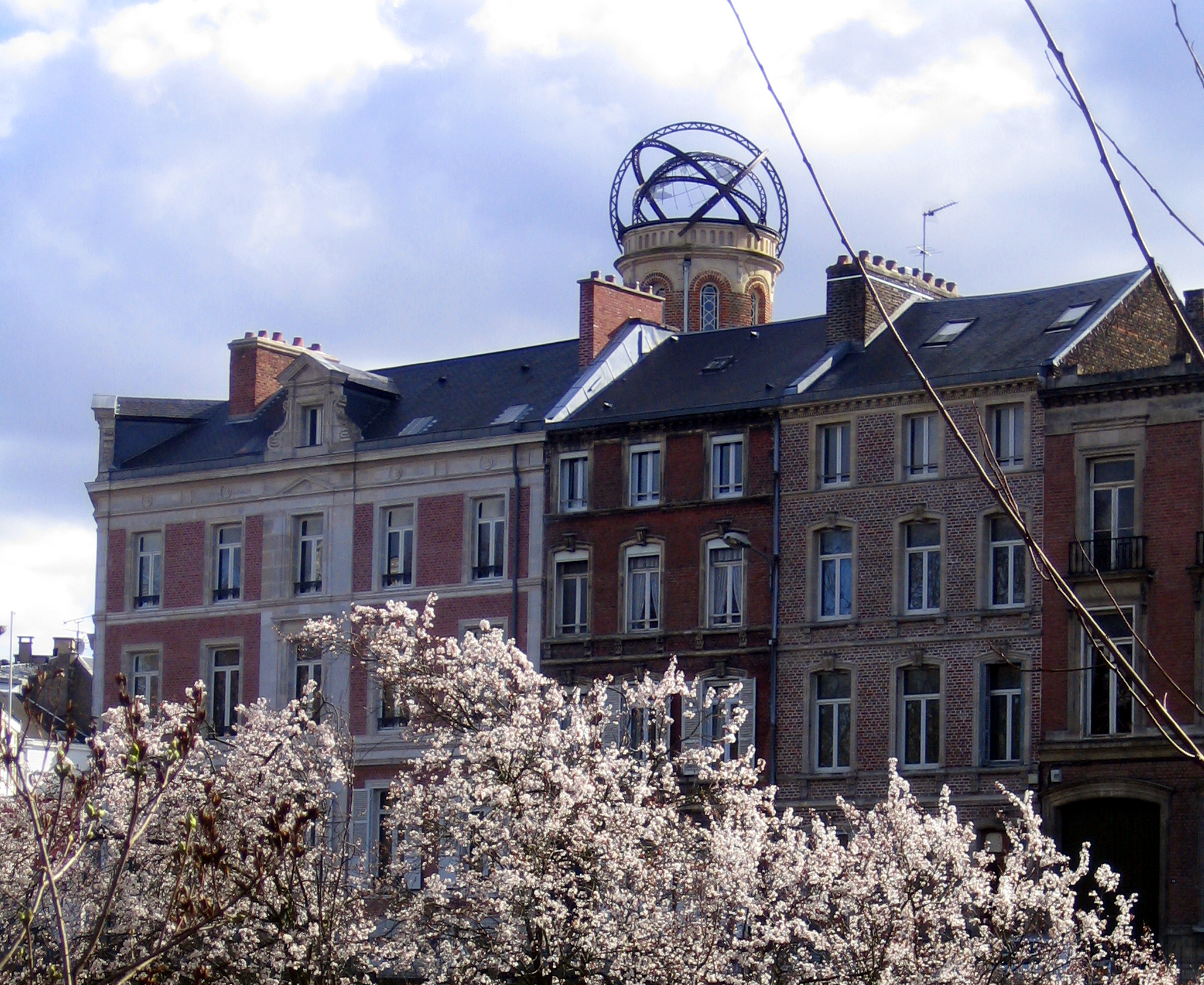
The House of Jules Verne from the Mail Albert 1st

- The House of Jules Verne, labeled Maisons des Illustres, is the home of the most translated writer in the world after Agatha Christie: Jules Verne. He lived here from 1882 to 1900 with his wife Honorine, and wrote part of his work in this mansion of the 19th century. To visit is to enter into the intimate and creative universe of the author. The building largely retains its original decor and opens almost all of its rooms, from the ground floor to the attic. The permanent collections are presented on two floors, in the attic, the tower and the belvedere of the house: Approximately 700 collected objects evoke the personality, sources of inspiration and memories of Jules Verne. Costumed tours, performances, parties and literary encounters of thematic conferences are also regularly organised.
- The Gallery of stained glass is located in the workshop of master glassmaker Claude Barre, in a 16th-century house near to the cathedral. It presents a large collection to the public, including religious stained-glass windows and interiors, from the 11th to the 19th century. The gallery also offers demonstrations on the techniques of stained glass.
- The House of culture of Amiens (MCA or MACU) was inaugurated on 19 March 1966 by André Malraux. A major cultural institution in the region, it has two exhibition halls for contemporary art; the Matisse Hall and the Giacometti Room, which both regularly host exhibitions of sculptures, photographs and plastic arts.
- The Fonds régional d'art contemporain of Picardie (FRAC Picardie), created in 1983, aims to promote contemporary art, in particular through dissemination actions. As early as 1985, FRAC Picardie had specialised its action in the field of the design and its contemporary dimensions. It is also interested in new media, on and off paper, since artists are now working through the video medium. This has allowed it to acquire a good reputation in France and abroad. In 30 years, the FRAC has brought together a unique collection of a thousand drawings which include major names of contemporary art, such as Basquiat, Dubuffet, Oppenheim, Twombly, Matta, and Manessier. In 2001, discussions are undertaken to construct a new building to accommodate the fonds and its collections.

Amiens was strongly tipped to host the Louvre II.

==== Concert halls ====
The city has a number of concert spaces, mostly small venues, and pubs also host numerous concerts throughout the year.

- The Zenith of Amiens was inaugurated in September 2008. With a capacity of 6,000 seats, it is the work of the Italian architect Massimiliano Fuksas. Holder of the required Zénith label, this facility allows the hosting of national and international headline acts and ensures a high level of services and organisation. The accessibility of the place by motorway (A16, A29, A1), and the possibilities of free parking, the venue radiates to Belgium and to the Paris region.
- The megacity is the Park of the Congress and Exhibitions of Amiens. Located in immediate proximity of the Zenith of Amiens and the Stade de la Licorne, there are two auditoriums of 350 and 1,000 places where concerts and comedy shows are programmed.
- Cirque Jules-Verne, the biggest grand circus of France, has about 1,700 seating spaces since its renovation in 2003. It welcomes, among other shows, concerts.
- The House of culture of Amiens offers many live shows and concerts. It manages also New Dreams, a room for 120 seated or 300 standing, which also hosts concerts.
- The Auditorium Henri Dutilleux is the auditorium of the Conservatoire à rayonnement régional d'Amiens. With high acoustic quality, it offers 370 seats on three levels. It offers mainly classical concerts.
- La Lune des Pirates is the stage of contemporary music (SMAC) of the city. Created in 1987 in a former banana warehouse of the Belu Wharf, La Lune has a capacity of 250 seats.

==== Theaters ====
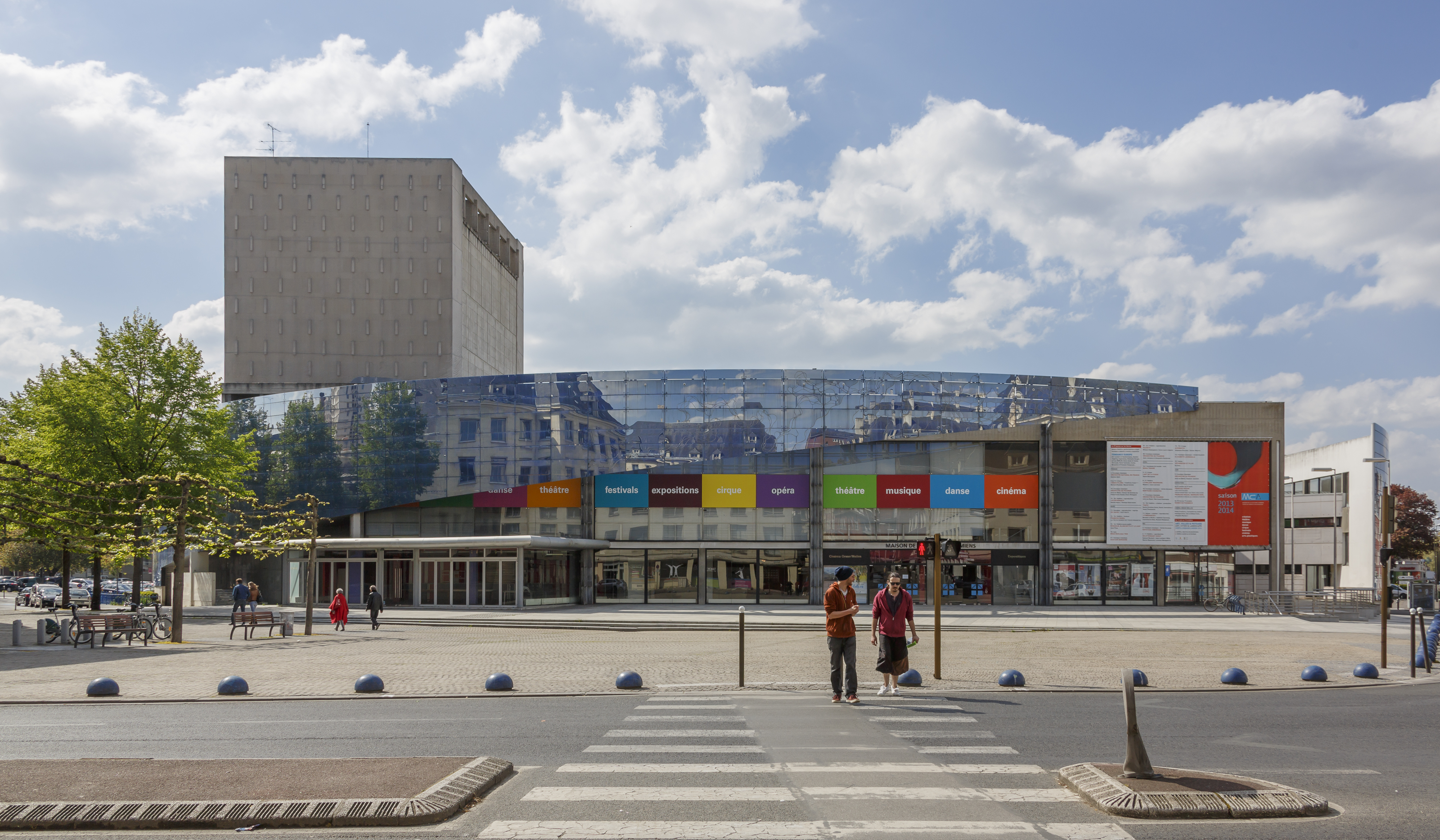
The House of Culture of Amiens

- The House of Culture of Amiens has the Scène nationale accreditation from the Ministry of Culture. Cultural place of the city, its mission is broad and covers many disciplines: theatre, music, dance, cinema and visual arts. It brings together two theatres: the Grand Théâtre (1,070 seats) and the Petit Théâtre (300 seats).
- The Comédie de Picardie (ComDePic) is one of the city's main theatres. This Scène conventionnée was founded in 1989 by the Regional Council of Picardy and offers fifteen plays every year. The theatre has a room of 400 places and houses its own company.
- The Maison du Théâtre was established in April 1988 in the historic neighborhood of Saint-Leu. Its activities range from creation to dissemination, training and theatrical information. Focused on contemporary theatre, the Maison du Théâtre also hosts local theatrical companies and their creations.
- The puppet theatre "Chés cabotants of Amiens", founded in 1933, is the heir of some eighty cabotan theatres which were created in Amiens in the 19th century. Amiens is known as the French capital of the puppet son. Since 1997, a theatre is dedicated to Chés Cabotans of Amiens and its popular hero Lafleur. It is located in the heart of the Saint-Leu neighborhood.
- The Boîte à Rire is a café-théâtre, created in September 2012. This 48-seat hall is located near to Amiens Cathedral, and proudly displays a one-man show and Boulevard theatre.

==== Cultural Centers ====
Amiens Métropole has nine cultural centers which cover much of the metropolitan area: six in various districts of Amiens, and three in the neighbouring communes of Longueau, Camon and Glisy. These outreach facilities working in the field of art and creation are openly oriented "venues". Open to all, they offer an eclectic programme; theatre and concerts, shows for young people and dance, projections of films, exhibitions, meetings and debates. In 2013, they accommodated 48,000 people.

- The Briqueterie was installed in 2001 on the site of the former Friant military barracks in the Elbeuf neighborhood. As part of its programming, it hosts concerts, as well as exhibitions, public theatre and shows for youths. To this end, it has a room that can accommodate 120 people.
- The Jacques Tati cultural center is located in the heart of the Pierre Rollin. Opened in January 2008, the Jacques Tati theatre has 198 seats and hosts plays, public youth performances, and concerts.
- The Léo-Lagrange cultural center is located in Saint Germain district. A venue for exhibitions, meetings and performances of music, theatre, dance and circus, it has a room of 85 seats named the chapel.
- The CSC is installed in the heart of the Etouvie neighborhood. Its missions include the dissemination of exhibitions and performances. To this end, it has a room of 150 seats.
- The Étoile du sud is located in the neighbourhood Victorine-Autier. This cultural center is specialized in urban cultures and has the peculiarity of having a computer (MAO) recording studio.
- The Safran is located in the north neighborhood of Amiens. This 'multidisciplinary and experimental' Scène conventionnée offers diverse programming: Drama, public youth shows, dance and exhibitions. Its theatre hall, known as Gérard-Philipe has 220 spaces. Saffron also hosts a music complex, the Cité Carter, which offers rehearsal studios, recording sessions and organises concerts of contemporary music in its 250-seat hall.

==== Libraries ====
The Bibliothèques d'Amiens Métropole is a network of 28 facilities spread over the whole territory of the metropolis. The heart of this network is the Louis Aragon library, located on Rue de la République. Built between 1823 and 1826, it is one of the oldest municipal libraries in France. It experienced several improvements, including campaigns of work between 1982 and 1993, which have endowed it with new spaces: Two auditoriums, a youth space, a library and an art library.

Registration and borrowing is free for all of the people of Amiens in all libraries. Two libraries also provide service to neighborhoods and the communes of the agglomeration, and there is home delivery of documents for people with reduced mobility.

==== Cinemas ====
There are three cinemas:

- The Cinema Gaumont Amiens (12 rooms, 2,700 seats) was inaugurated in September 2005. Located just steps from the Amiens railway station, it has a large lobby and a 600-seat room. A 500-space car park is located under the cinema. It is the work of the architects Philippe Chaix and Jean-Paul Morel and its interior decoration was entrusted to Christian Lacroix. In 2011, this multiplex received 887,000 cinemagoers.
- The Cine-Saint-Leu (one room with 250 seats) was inaugurated in October 2000, after the closure of the Regent Cinema located near the railway station. An arthouse cinema, it is part of the major cultural facilities of the Cathedral Centre. Its eclectic and cinephile programming offers the possibility to see the original version of contemporary films.
- The Studio Orson Welles (one room with 180 seats in the Maison de la culture d'Amiens). An arthouse cinema operated by the Maison de la culture d'Amiens, it offers arthouse films as well as retrospectives of great names of the seventh art, old or contemporary.

=== Cultural events and festivals ===
Throughout the year, Amiens is the seat of many cultural, traditional or economic events.

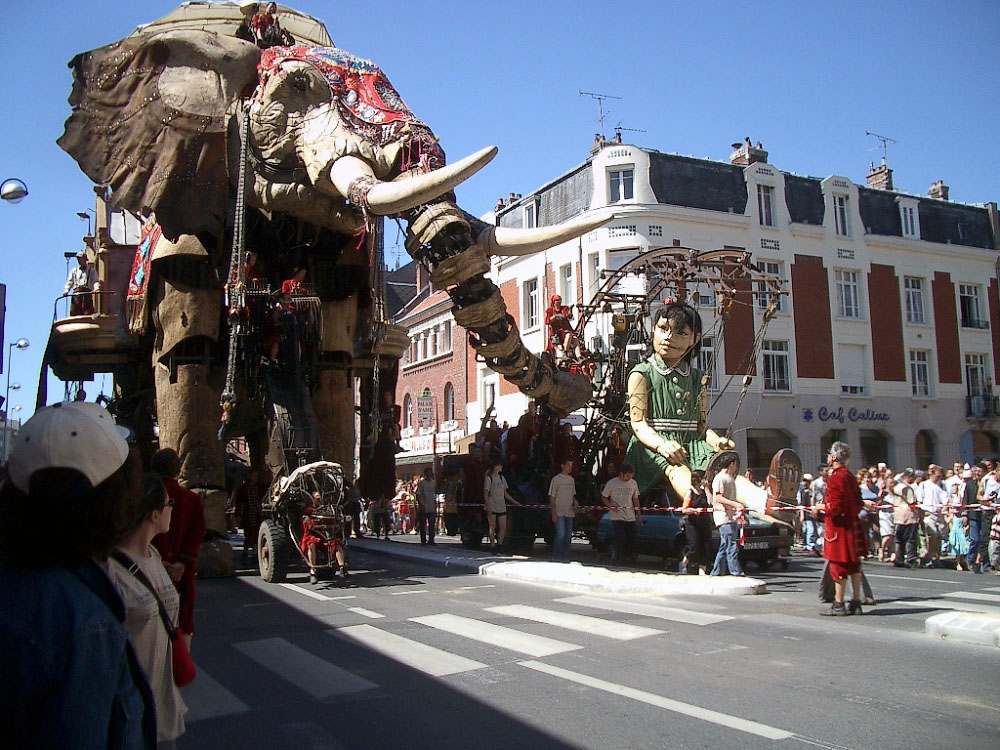
The Royal de luxe company during the 28th Fête dans la ville in 2005.

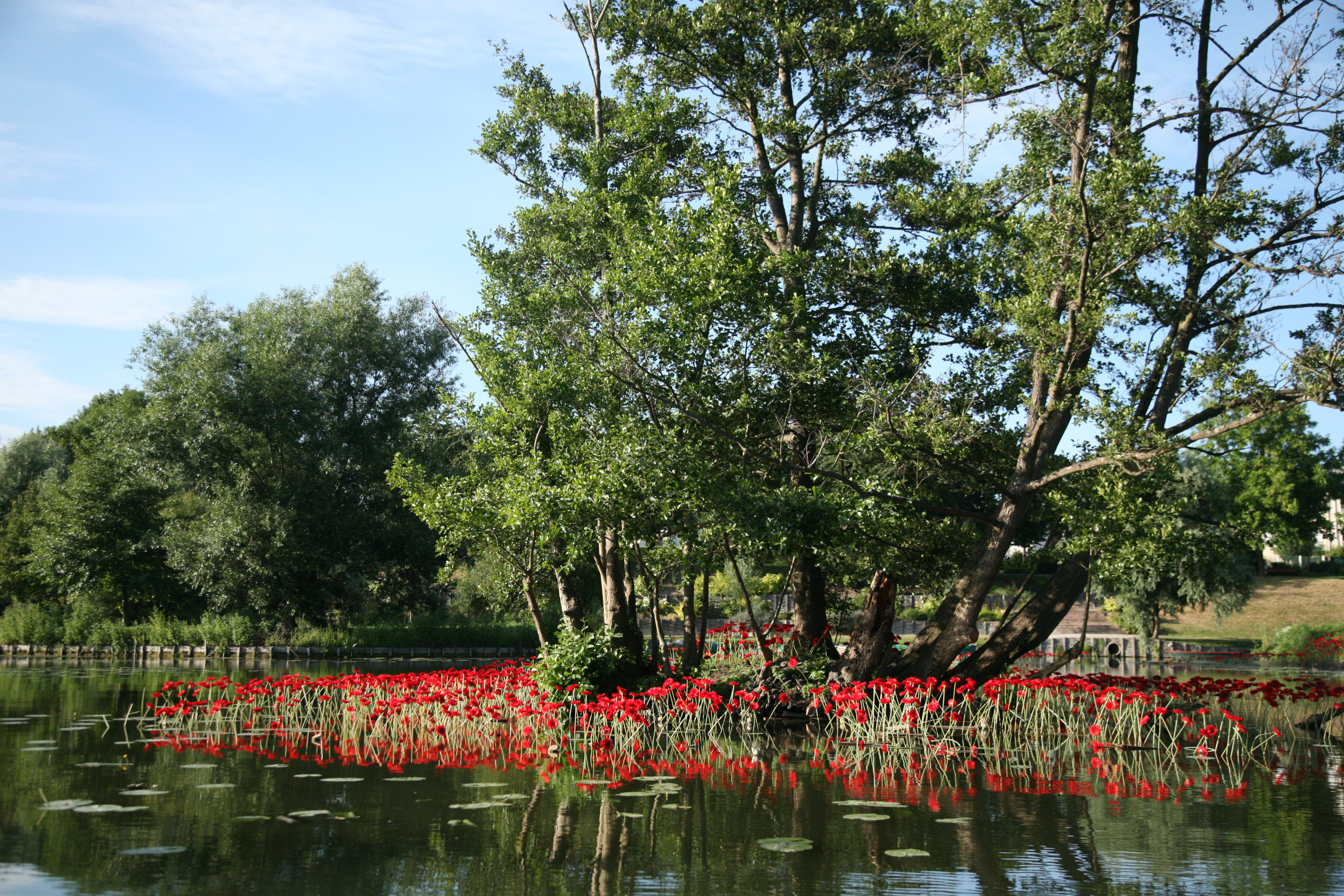
The Festival Art, city and landscape in the hortillonnages

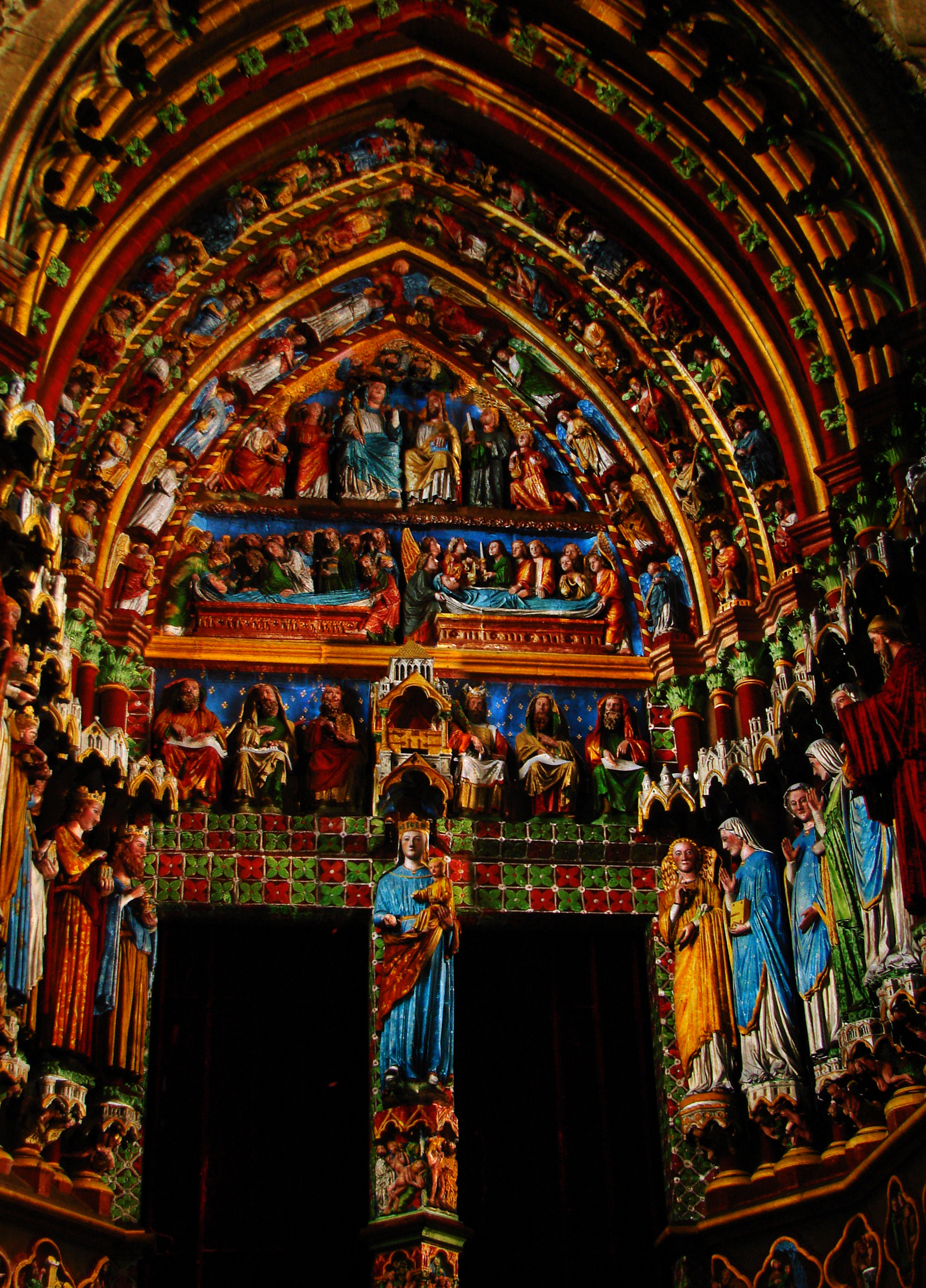
Detail of the son et lumière show of Amiens, la cathédrale en couleurs.

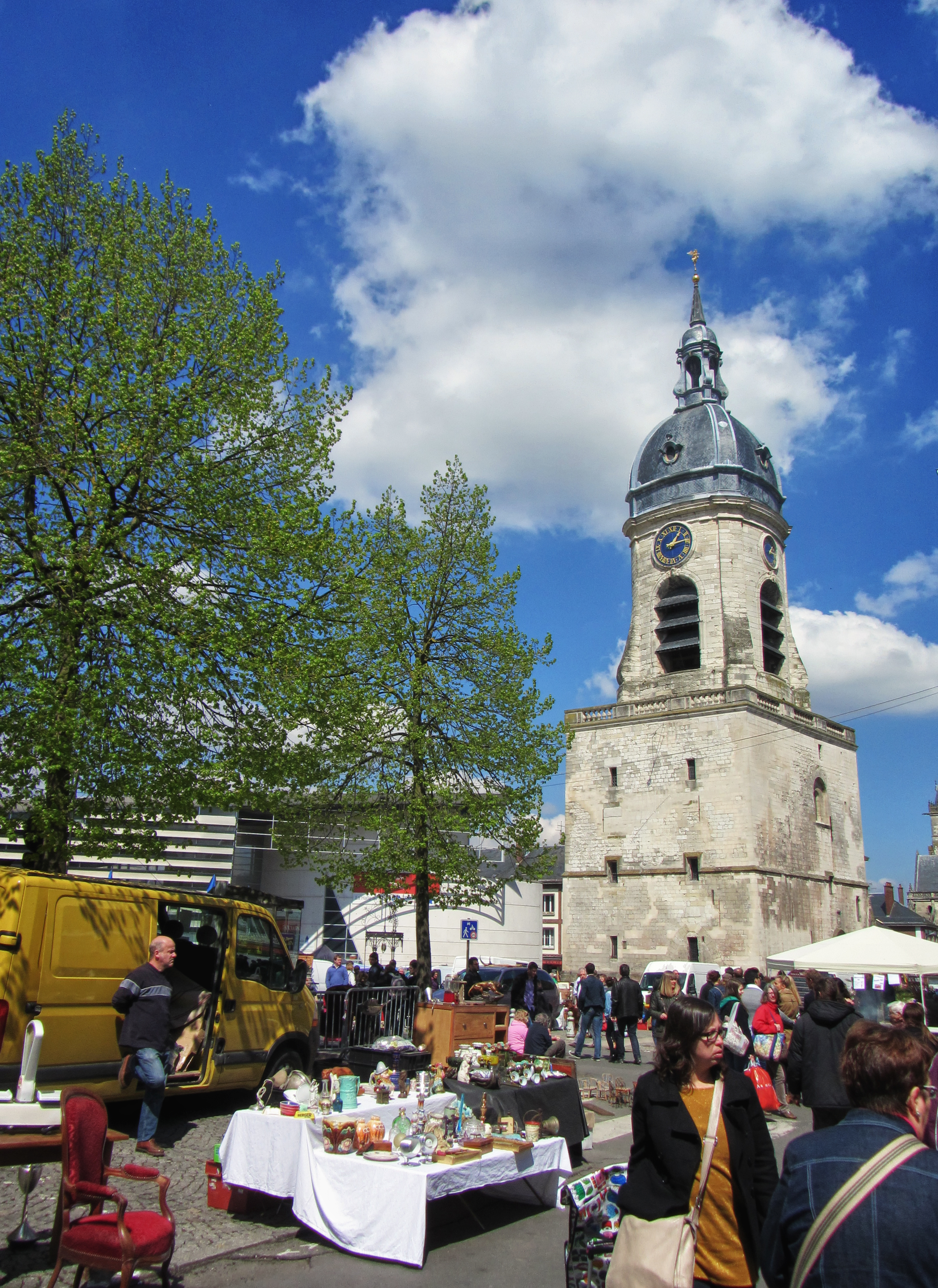
The Grande Réderie d'Amiens

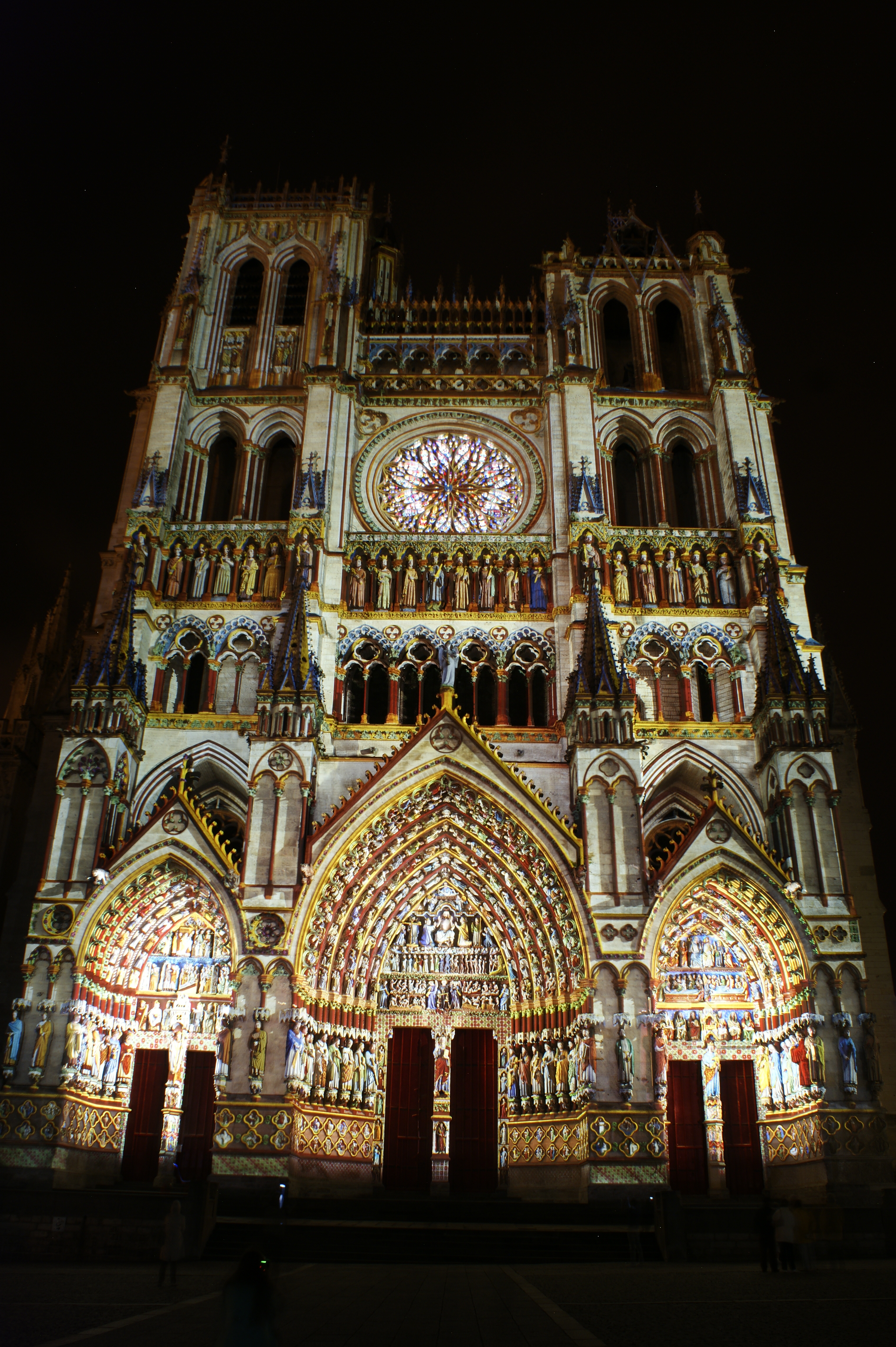
Amiens, la cathédrale en couleurs.

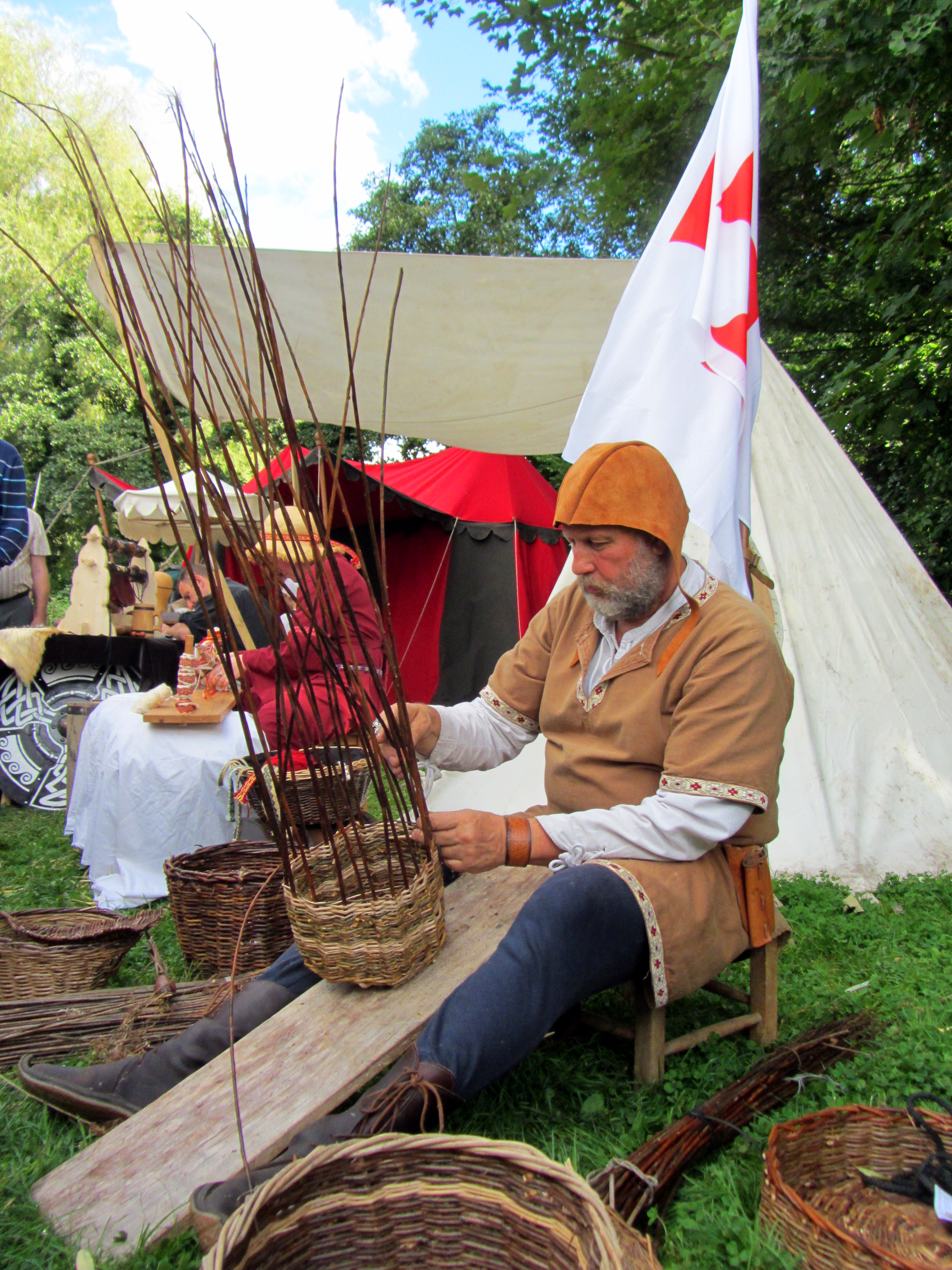
The Fête au bord de l'eau

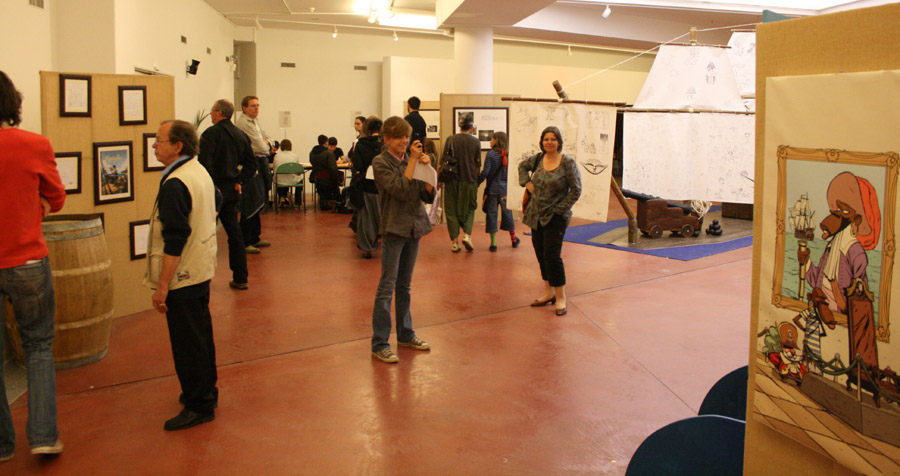
The 13th Rendez-Vous de la Bande Dessinée d'Amiens in 2008.

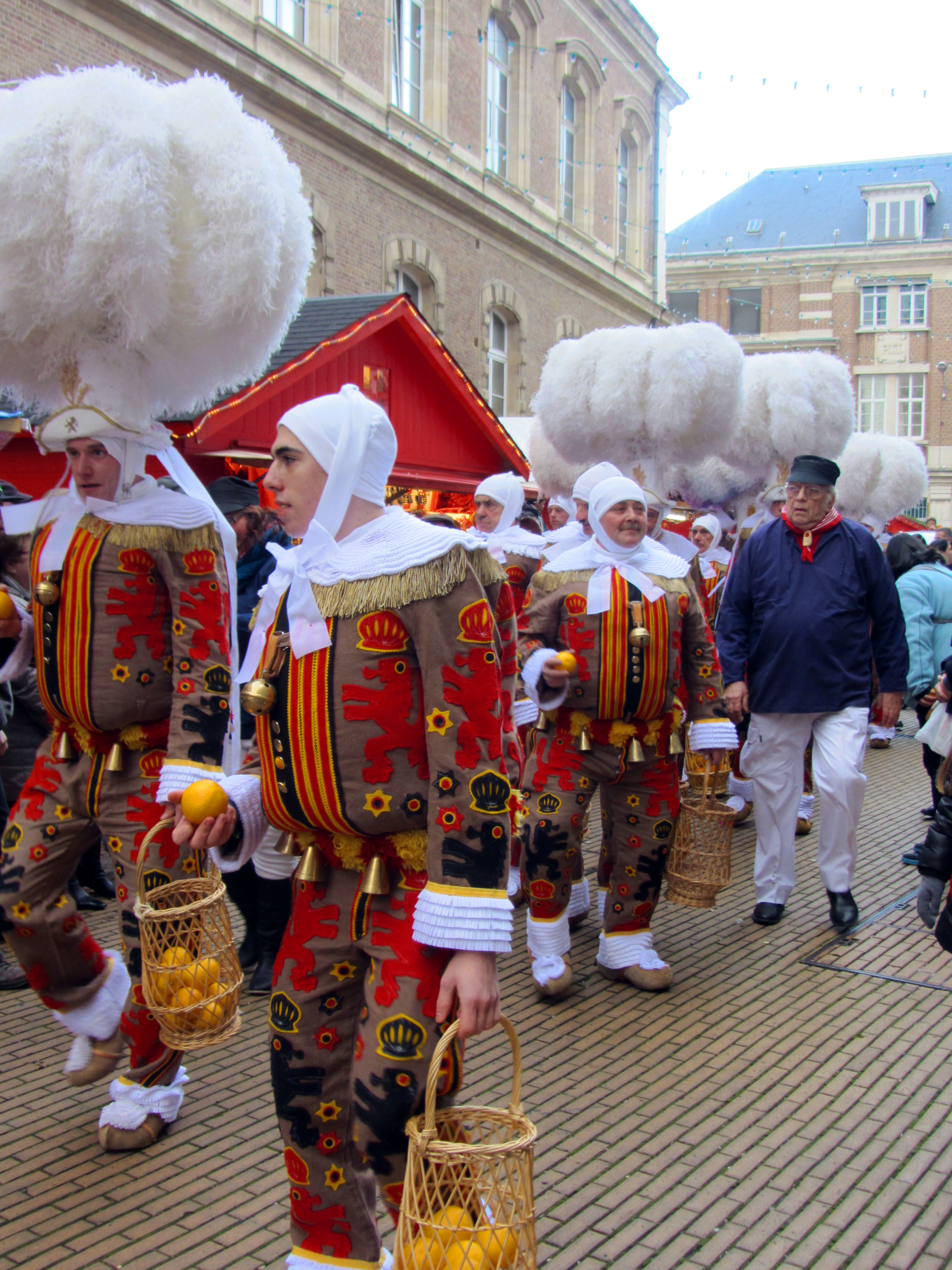
The Gilles of Binche at the inauguration of the Christmas market in 2013.

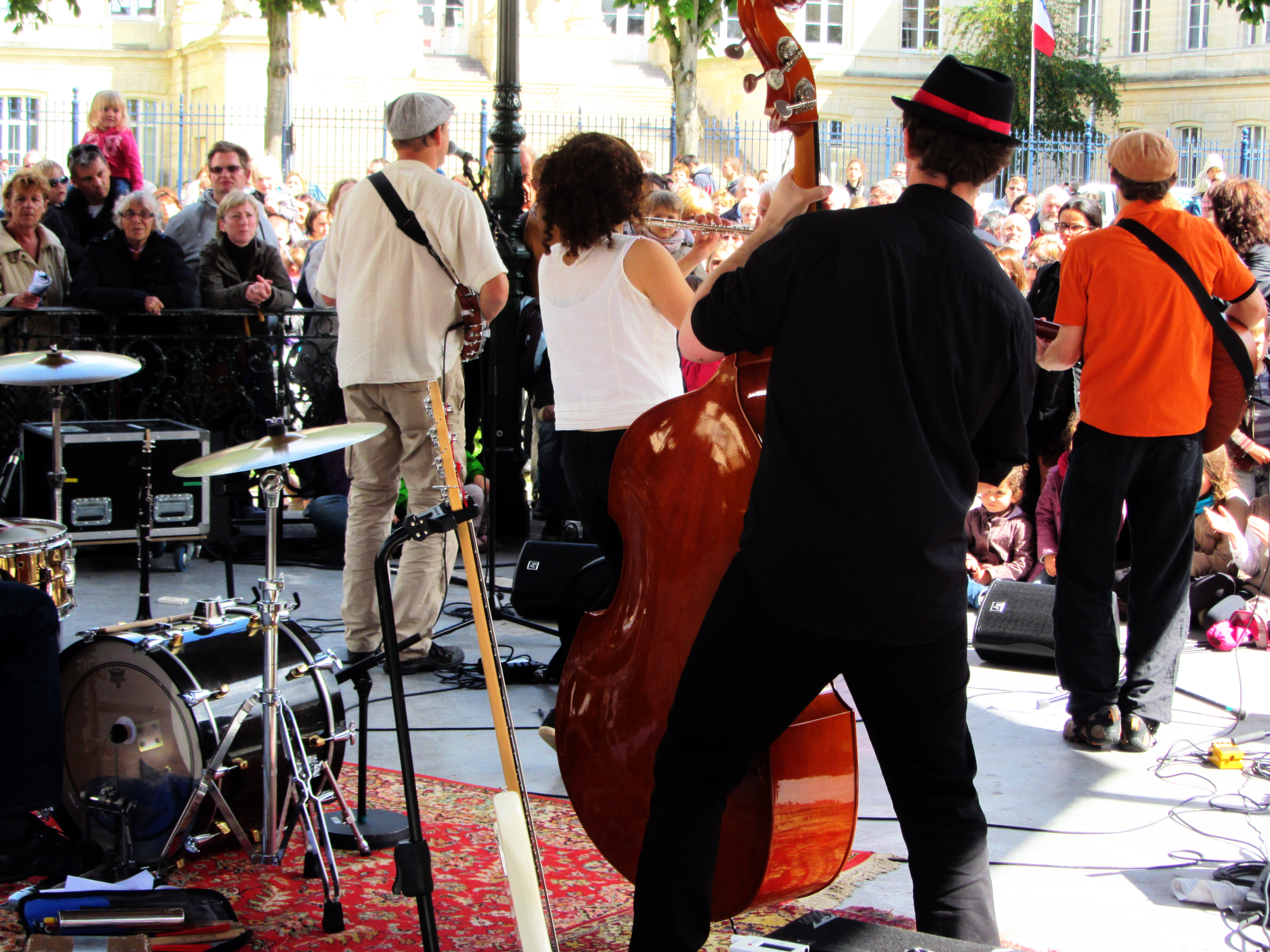
The Un été en musique event at the Jules Bocquet bandstand.

Annual Events
Month	Event	Subject	Number of editions (In 2015)
January	Festival Tendance Europe	This festival, organised by the Maison de la culture d'Amiens, is dedicated to contemporary creation. Programming highlights emerging European artists in a variety of areas: Theatre, dance, music, circus arts and visual arts.	9
February	Salon des Antiquaires	The Salon des Antiquaires of the city is held, every year, at the Megacity. Its reputation makes it one of the most important events of its kind in the north of the France.	12
March	Festival du jeu et de l'imaginaire : À toi de Jouer	This festival is dedicated to playing and imagination, featuring board games, card games, video games, roleplaying, comics and manga. Many tournaments are organized during this event which takes place at Megacity. The first edition was held on 12 and 13 May 2012 with Simon Astier for sponsor.	4
March	Salon du chocolat et gourmandises en Picardie	For three days at the Megacity, the fair offers demonstrations, parades, contests around the theme of chocolate and food in general.	5
April	Grande réderie de printemps	The Grande réderie de printemps (jumble sale) is a popular event that takes place twice a year: in spring (the last Sunday in April) and autumn (the first Sunday in October). After the Braderie de Lille, the Réderie of Amiens is the second largest event of its kind in France. It hosts more than 2,000 professional traders and individuals as well as 80,000 to 100,000 visitors to each edition.	–
May	Leitura furiosa	This festival, organized by the association "Cardan", offers various free activities relating to the world of words: Workshops, calligraphy, typography, writing games, slam and shows.	23
June	Foire Exposition de Picardie	It takes place at the park of the congress and exhibitions of Amiens, the Megacity. During nine days, it hosts approximately 50,000 visitors, 300 exhibitors and more than 20 activities.	76
June	Rendez-Vous de la Bande Dessinée d'Amiens	This comic strip festival, organised by the association "Explorers on the bubble", is one of the most important comic strip festivals in France. Created in 1996, it takes place each first weekend in June, in the University Library of the Cathedral hub. Various activities in connection with the festival are also organized at different places in the city.	20
June	Fête dans la ville	This international festival of street theatre is also known under the name of "The street is in Amiens". Created in 1977, it invited 20 companies for four days of performances, parades, fairground theatre, and circus performances in the streets of the city.	38
June	Marché sur l'eau	Once a year, in the context of the "Festival in the city", the walking on water takes place. Growers (gardeners) in traditional costumes boat down the Somme with their crafts loaded with fruit and vegetables from the hortillonnages.	–
June to July	Foire de la Saint Jean	It is the largest funfair in the north of the France. It takes place during 3 weeks between mid-June and mid-July on the esplanade of Hotoie.	–
June to September	Amiens, la cathédrale en couleurs	Created in 1999, this son et lumière show is the first world. Daily from mid-June to mid-September as well as in December, in the dark, the medieval colors of the portals of the façade of the cathedral are reborn thanks to projections of digital images. Since its inception, nearly two million people have attended the free event.	15
June to September	Un été en musique	This summer event, conducted from June to September, offers a series of free concerts outdoors (at Place René Goblet and Place Gambetta, and the Jules Bocquet bandstand). Programming is mainly of local artists.	–
June to October	Festival Art, villes et paysage – Hortillonnages Amiens	This festival, organized by the Maison de la culture d'Amiens, was born in 2010 under the heading "Imagine it now". Invited are landscapers, visual artists, architects and designers involved in the hortillonnages. In total, twenty artists facilities and landscaped gardens are located in several places in the hortillonnages. These unusual works (such as floating sculptures, reinvented huts, diverted gardens, revisited gardens) are visible either by walking track or boat, from June to October.	6
July	Voyage au cœur de l'été	The event, which takes place every July in the Espace Dewailly. The programming consists of live performances around world cultures, traditions, folklore and modernity.	11
July	Bal du 14 juillet	This ball takes place on the Place de l'hôtel de ville. It is followed by a fireworks display at the parc de la Hotoie.	–
July to August	Un été à Amiens	This summer event, conducted by the city hall of Amiens, brings together four concepts spread across three sites in the city: "Amiens-les-Bains" (children) and "Beach Attitude" (adolescents) in the Parc Saint Pierre, "Zen Attitude" in Place Gambetta and "Sportez-vous bien" at Grand Marais.	2
August	Défi Jules Verne	This event, also known as "Montgolfiade", commemorates the first balloon flight (1873) of the most illustrious adopted son of Amiens: Jules Verne. Its uniqueness lies in the take-off of many balloons and unusual machines (between 20 and 30) from the Parc de la Hotoie. Music with readings of excerpts from novels by Jules Verne accompany their flight in the sky of the city. Subject to favourable weather conditions, this event takes place every month of August.	10
August	Bal de la libération	This festive event, which is held at the Place de l'hôtel de ville, celebrates the liberation of the city on 31 August 1944. It joins the various commemorations and tributes traditionally organised there on this day.	6
September	Fête au bord de l'eau	This traditional festival, organised by the association "Jacobins Traditions and history", plunges the historic neighborhood of Saint-Leu into a medieval atmosphere for two days with a market, medieval camp, trades of yesteryear, parades in the streets and on the water as well as other activities. It is on this occasion that the popular tournament of water jousting runs. Created in 1990, this free event takes place every second weekend of September and gathers an average of 80,000 visitors.	25
October	Grande réderie d'automne	The autumn edition of the Grande réderie d'Amiens is held every first Sunday in October.	–
October	Ô mon Cloître	Evolution of the Nuit Blanche (9 editions), this event is dedicated to the performing arts and visual arts and is held in the cloister of the grey nuns.	1
October	Festiv'Art	This festival, held since 2006 by the association of "Free radicals", allows regional, national and international artists to find themselves on the same stage for an evening which is followed by street arts and circus, theatre, concerts and graphic services.	8
November	Festival international du film d'Amiens	This international film festival ranks among the five largest film festivals in France. Created in 1980, it is held for nine days in November and records more than 60,000 entries each year.	35
November	Picardie Mouv	This festival of musiques actuelles, organized by the Picardy regional Council, offers eclectic programming that mixes a collage of artists of international, national and local groups.	10
December	Christmas Market of Amiens	The largest Christmas market in the north of France, it attracts over one million visitors each year. The market consists of approximately 135 chalets in the city center and offers various animations (a Son et lumière show, Amiens, la cathédrale en couleurs, Ferris wheel, ice rink, village of Santa Claus, parades, and carnival rides).	18
December	Amiens, la cathédrale en couleurs	Winter Edition of the Son et lumière show of the cathedral.	–

Multi-annual Events
Month	Event	Subject	Regularity	Last edition (Number)
March	Rencontres internationales Jules Verne	These meetings, organised by the Centre international Jules-Verne, are held every two years since 1997.	Biannual	2015 (10)

=== Music ===
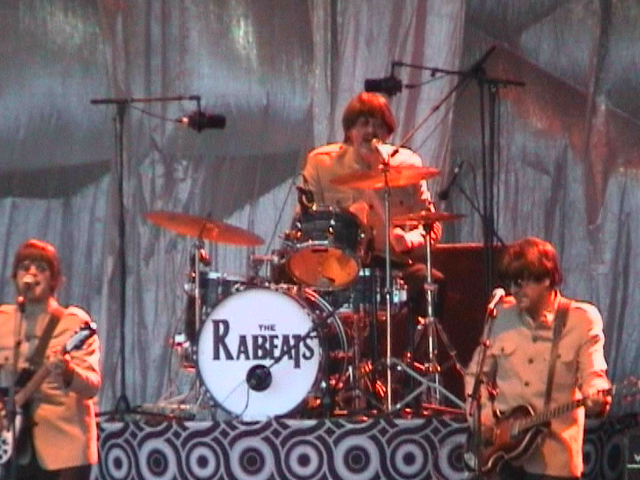
The Rabeats

Even if it rarely achieves national notoriety (with the notable exceptions of Les Fatals Picards, The Rabeats, Olympe, Albin de la Simone, Disiz and Rokia Traoré), the Amiens music scene is active and developed. In this dynamic, the New French Rock scene holds a central place and is organised around a collective, Amiens Burning, which is responsible for networking the breeding ground for the local rock scene, to accompany its projects, and organize concerts.

Since their creation, La Lune des Pirates and Cité Carter also provide support to the local scene. For example, the Cité Carter produces a compilation each year, with local groups.

Highlights of the Amiens music scene:

- Pop: Olympe, Nathaniel Isaac Smog, Ribo
- Hip Hop/Rap: Disiz (born in Amiens), D.S.C. (Dirty South Crew), Lj Crackus
- French singers: Albin de la Simone (born in Amiens), EmilieAnneCharlotte
- World Music: Rokia Traoré (Malian-born singer who lived in Amiens in the 1990s)
- Multiple genres: Les Fatals Picards, Zic Zazou (group of nine musicians created in 1982 and winner of La Grande Battle in November 2012)

Classical music is represented by the Orchestre de Picardie and the University Orchestra of Picardy. Vocal practice is represented by the Regional Choir of Picardy, the University Choir of Picardie, and the Choir of France Picardy.

One can also include the Harmony Saint-Pierre, a fanfare of 70 musicians, which has become a local institution since its inception in 1894.

The city has the Conservatoire à rayonnement régional d'Amiens, seat of strong musical activity (framed by 70 teachers, an administrative and technical team with an additional 20 people).

=== Literature ===
Amiens saw rise, over the centuries, to major writers. In the first half of the 17th century, Vincent Voiture, poet and letter writer, was the darling of the Précieuses for the fluidity of his style. In 1634, he was member of the 1st Académie française. In 1678, Charles du Fresne, sieur du Cange, nicknamed "the French Varro", published his Glossarium in 3 volumes. This glossary of medieval Latin is still authoritative today. In 1750, Jean Baptiste Gresset, a playwright and poet who was celebrated in his time and was a member of the Académie française, founded the Academy of Amiens which is still active today. He was named perpetual president.

In 1782, the Amiens native Choderlos de Laclos published Les Liaisons dangereuses where he staged a depraved nobility. Considered one of the masterpieces of 18th-century literature, the book has toured the world and is known as an Oscar-winning film adaptation.

Here I am quite citizen of Amiens. It seems to me that I was born. I live very happy, although uncomfortable to work. Amiens is a wise city, even-tempered, and the company is friendly and literate. It is near Paris, close enough to have the highlights without unbearable noise and bustle.

— Jules Verne

In the 19th century, there was a brilliant literary life around the Académie des sciences, des lettres et des arts d'Amiens with historian Albéric de Calonne and the Yvert family. However, the great name of Amiens literary life is Jules Verne. He animated all intellectual activity, giving balls and parties, while his wife held a famous salon. He often attended the library of the industrial society, which subscribed to numerous scientific journals. A member of the Academy of Sciences, Letters and Arts of Amiens from 8 March 1872, he was elected Director in 1875, and in 1881 and, on this occasion, he delivered several speeches of welcome, especially for one of his friends, Amiens cartoonist Gédéon Baril, who signed illustrations of Dix heures en chasse with Hetzel. Engaged in local life, he was Councillor of Amiens from 1888 to 1904. He was closely interested in the affairs of the city, wrote many reports on the theatre and brought its support to the construction of the municipal circus.

Amiens does appear explicitly in his novels but there are however characteristic elements of the city such as the cathedral and the river. This is the case, for example, for the imaginary city of Ragz in Le secret de Wilhem Storitz. In the novel Une fantaisie du docteur Ox, the inhabitants of the fictional town of Virgamen, the Virgamenois, refer directly to the Amiénois and their prudent nature.

In 1875, he delivered before the Academy of Sciences, Letters and Arts of Amiens a speech entitled "An ideal city: Amiens in the year 2000" where he portrays himself wandering in a forward-thinking city of Amiens. Since then, the city has built a tourist route from this text.

He died in Amiens in 1905, and he deeply marked the town's footprint, so that today many places, monuments and events bear his name. He rests at La Madeleine cemetery where one can read on his tomb: Vers l'immortalité et l'éternelle jeunesse. [Towards immortality and eternal youth].

Such as it is with his distinctive smile, how much I love the Golden Virgin, with her smile of heavenly hostess; how much I love its home at the door of the Cathedral in its adornment exquisite and simple of hawthorns.

— Marcel Proust (about the portal of the Virgin Golden of the Cathedral of Amiens)

In 1885, Englishman John Ruskin published the Bible of Amiens, which was translated into French, extensively annotated and prefaced, in 1904, by Marcel Proust. This book dedicated to Notre-Dame d'Amiens was the opportunity for Proust to recall his admiration for the English author and the Cathedral of Amiens.

I would like to give the reader the desire and the means to spend a day at Amiens in a sort of Ruskinesque pilgrimage. It was not worth starting by asking him to go to Florence or Venice, when Ruskin wrote a whole book on Amiens.

— Marcel Proust

In the second half of the 19th century, Jules Barni, Member of Parliament for the Somme, Associate Professor of philosophy and scholar translated Kant's work in French and thus enabled its dissemination in France.

A native of Amiens, Paul Bourget published Le Disciple in 1889, a novel today considered his major work. He was elected, 5 years later, to the Académie française.

Born in Sainte-Anne district in 1885, Roland Dorgelès published Les Croix de bois in 1919. A masterpiece written from his notes taken at the Front, the novel won the Prix Femina the same year. Though capable of obtaining the Prix Goncourt, it was beaten by À l'ombre des jeunes filles en fleurs by Marcel Proust, 6 votes against 4. A member of the Académie Goncourt in 1929, he was elected president in 1954 until his death in 1973.

In 1926, the Amiens native Henri Deberly, won the Prix Goncourt with Le Supplice de Phèdre, a novel inspired by his home city.

=== Cinema ===
Many films or scenes from films were shot in Amiens and its surroundings.

- 1946: Jéricho by Henri Calef with Nadine Alari, Pierre Brasseur and Jacques Charon
- 1959: Head Against the Wall, film of Georges Franju, with Pierre Brasseur and Jean-Pierre Mocky
- 1970: The Clowns of Federico Fellini around the Cirque Jules-Verne
- 1973: La Rose de Fer of Jean Rollin with Françoise Pascal, Hugues Quester and Nathalie Perrey
- 1976: La Saga des Français: La Rumeur, film of Michel Pamart and Marcel Trillat
- 1980: La femme enfant, film of Raphaële Billetdoux, with Klaus Kinski
- 1989: Roselyne and the Lions of Jean-Jacques Beineix, with Isabelle Pasco filmed around Cirque Jules-Verne
- 1991: Walking a Tightrope of Nico Papatakis, with Michel Piccoli also filmed around Cirque Jules-Verne
- 1994: Sister My Sister of Nancy Meckler with Julie Walters and Joely Richardson
- 1997: Arlette of Claude Zidi, with Josiane Balasko and Christopher Lambert
- 1999: Je suis né d'une cigogne, film of Tony Gatlif, with Romain Duris
- 2000: Elle et lui au 14e étage of Sophie Blondy, with Guillaume Depardieu and Benoît Magimel
- 2000: Confort moderne of Dominique Choisy
- 2002: Carnage of Delphine Gleize
- 2002: Paris selon Moussa, film of Cheik Doukouré
- 2008: Paul Rondin est...Paul Rondin, short film of Frédéric Vin, with François Berland
- 2008: Blanche, short film of Eric Griffon du Bellay, with Romane Bohringer and Clémence Poésy
- 2008: Louise Hires a Contract Killer, film of Gustave Kervern and Benoît Delépine, with Yolande Moreau and Benoît Poelvoorde filmed around the Tour Bleue (before its destruction), in the Étouvie neighborhood.
- 2008: Française, film of Souad El-Bouhati, with Hafsia Herzi
- 2009: Ricky of François Ozon with Alexandra Lamy
- 2010: Copacabana, film of Marc Fitoussi, with Isabelle Huppert
- 2012: Les Fraises des bois, film of Dominique Choisy
- 2013: La Tête la première, film of Amélie Van Elmbt

=== Comics ===
Amiens is a stronghold of comics in France. A whole generation of designers and Amiens writers make the city an important creative center of the 9th art. The main actors in this generation, include Régis Hautière, Norédine Allam who notably led the recolouring of the 33 Asterix albums in the framework of the project "The great collection" and also Antoine Dodé, David François, Fraco, Hardoc, Greg Blondin, and Nicolas Hitori De.

The city was also the birthplace or home of big names in the comic strip universe, such as the Amiens native Joseph Pinchon, creator of the character of Bécassine; Paul Gillon, winner of the Grand Prix de la ville d'Angoulême and also Philippe Thirault.

Actor around the BD, the association On a marché sur la bulle [Explorers on the bubble] organises the Rendez-vous de la bande dessinée d'Amiens, one of the greatest French comic book festivals. Active throughout the territory, the structure also manages a resource center and has an editorial department with the Éditions de la Gouttière.

=== Regional culture ===
- Chés Cabotans d'Anmien or the Cabotins of Amiens is a small Picardy traditional puppet theatre founded in 1933. Lafleur, the hero, was created around 1811 at Saint-Leu. He talks in Picard, exclusively. Traditionally a lackey costume (wearing a red velvet tricorne hat) dressed, Lafleur is cheerful, dynamic, independent and resourceful; its motto is: "bin mier, bin boere, pis did rin foere!" (Drink well, eat well and then do nothing).
- The Picard language is recognised regional language. It is spoken in France in the Picardy and Nord-Pas-de-Calais regions, and in Belgium in the Province of Hainaut. Various associations work for the promotion and development of Picardy culture expressed in theatre, song, in spoken tales but also in writing, notably in novels, journals, and poetry. Since 1993, the Regional Council of Picardy has developed within the "Office Culturel Régional de Picardie" a cultural policy for the language and the Picardy culture. "The Agency for Picard", created in 2008, is headquartered in Amiens. Picard is taught at the University of Amiens.
- The blasons populaires are surnames or the nicknames given to the inhabitants of cities and the Picardy villages. These surpitchets sometimes come from the history of the city, sometimes a verbal game, sometimes through a mockery of people. The nickname of the inhabitants of Amiens is: Chés Maqueus d'gueugues d'Anmien [Amiens nut eaters] in reference to an episode of the Spanish invasion. On 11 March 1597, the Spanish armies developed a ploy to seize the city: The soldiers of Hernán Tello de Portocarrero, Governor of Doullens, disguised as peasants, came to the gates of the walls with nuts. The starving citizens of Amiens opened the doors and the Spaniards took the city.

==== Gastronomic specialities ====
During December, the town hosts the largest Christmas market in northern France. Amiens, in the image of the Picardy region, has a rich gastronomic heritage. Here are some of the specialities:

Amiens is known for a few local foods, including "macarons d'Amiens", small, round-shaped biscuit-type macaroons made from almond paste, fruit and honey, which were first recorded in 1855; "tuiles amienoises", chocolate and orange curved "tuiles" or biscuits; Pâté de canard d'Amiens – duck pâté in pastry, made since the 17th century; and "la ficelle Picarde", an oven-baked cheese-topped crêpe with ham and mushroom filling, then topped with fresh cream flavoured with nutmeg, white pepper, and sprinkled with grated cheese before being browned in the oven. The region is also known for "flamiche aux poireaux", a puff pastry tart made with leeks and cream.

Other dishes include:

- The soup of the hortillons: A spring-vegetable soup which originated in the hortillonnages.
- The bisteu or bigalan: Potatoes, onions and bacon pie.
- The Andouillette amiénoise: Pork dumpling mixed with a panade and onions.
- Beignet d'Amiens so-called pets d'âne [donkey pets]: Small round doughnuts and fried fresh goat's cheese and beef marrow.
- The Gâteau battu: Golden yellow brioche crumbs with an aerated texture. It is rich in eggs and butter.
- The galopin: A French toast made from brioche bread cooked like a big pancake.
- The Picardy rabotte: Apple wrapped and baked in a puff pastry.
- The Dariole of Amiens: A popular pastry from the 18th century, topped with a cream with almonds.
- Amiens barley sugar.

The Summer Rambo apple cultivar originated near Amiens in the 16th century.

=== Notable people ===
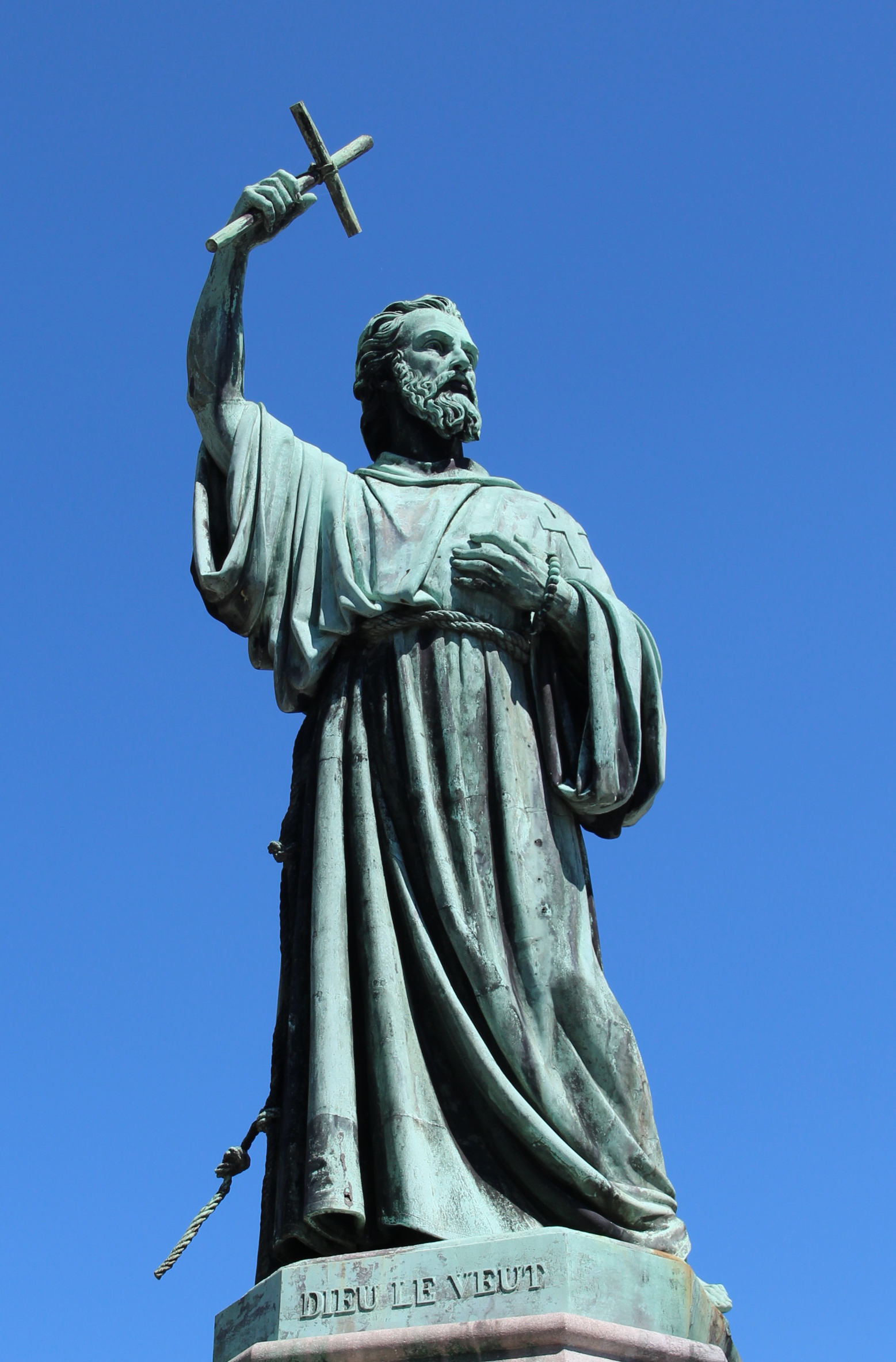
Statue of Peter the Hermit by Gédéon de Forceville, near to the cathedral.

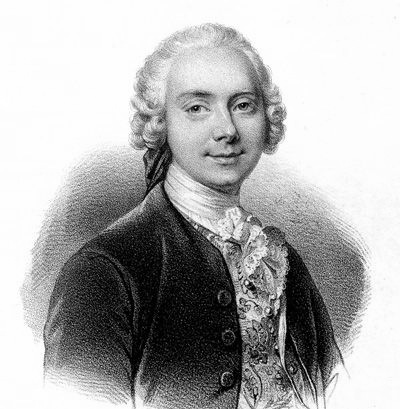
Jean-Baptiste Gresset

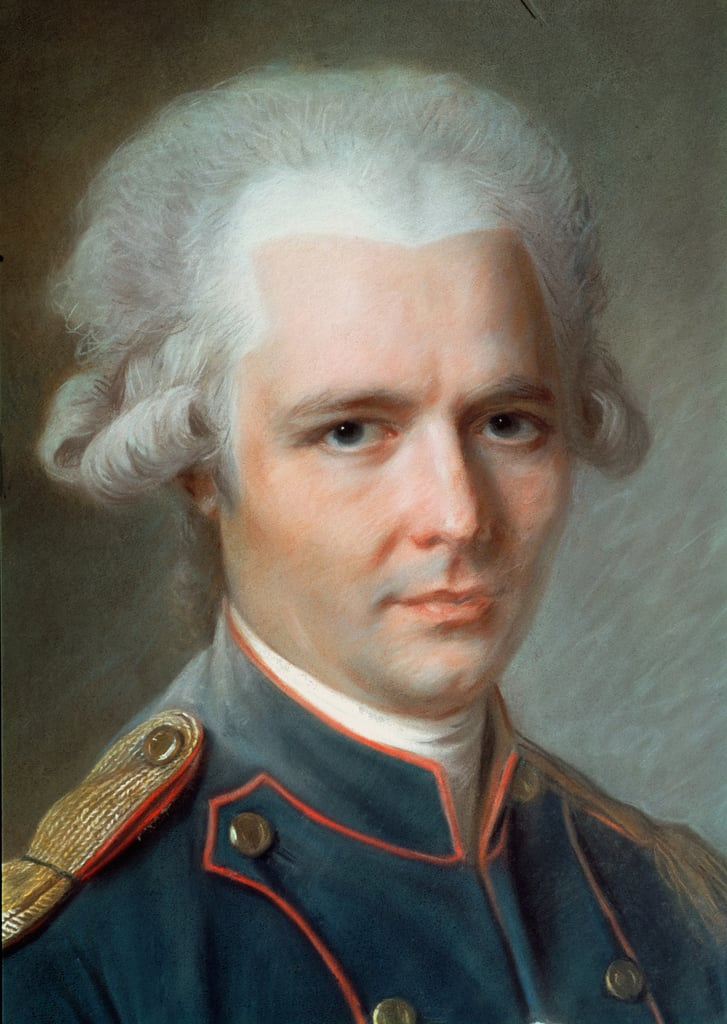
Choderlos de Laclos

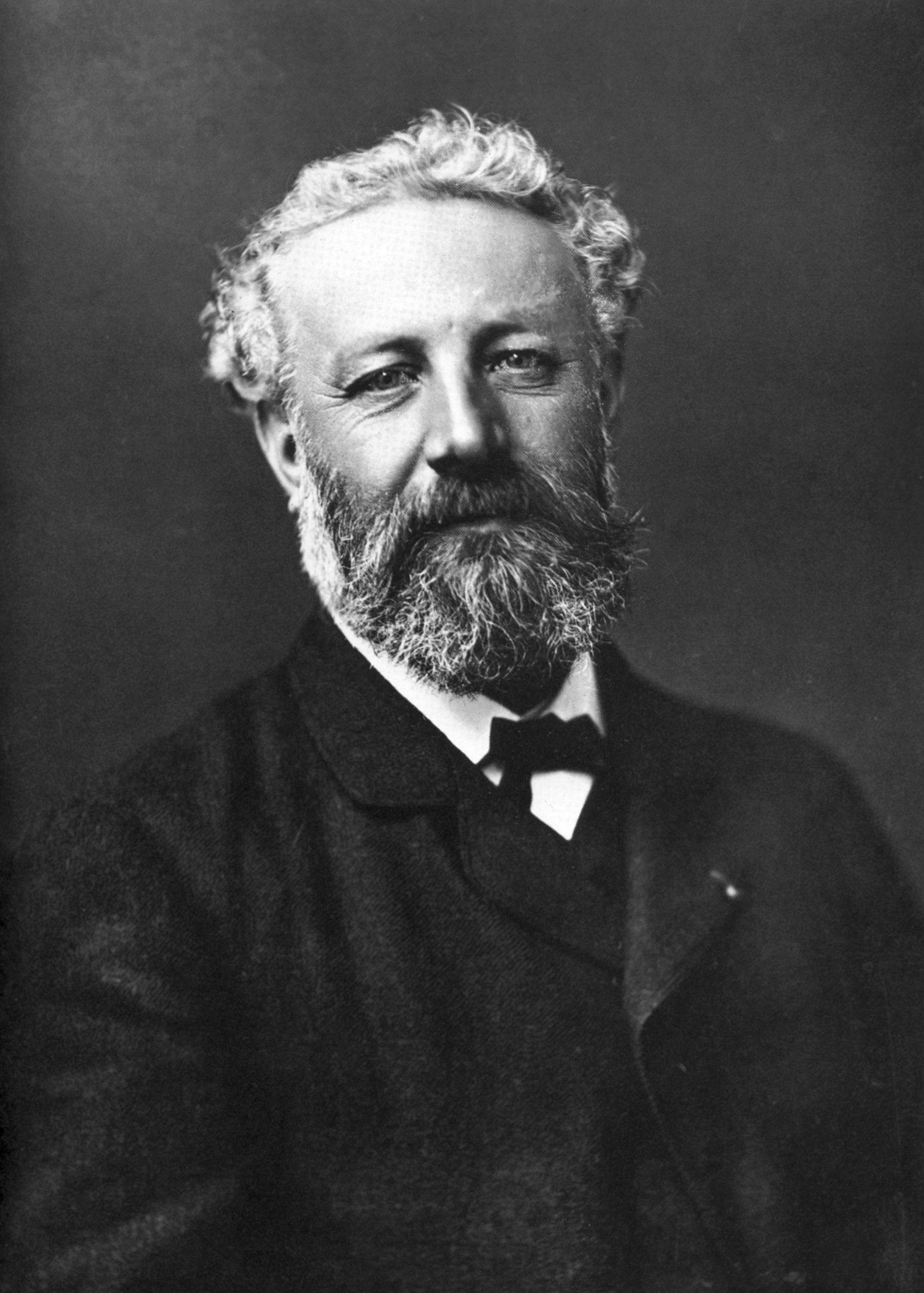
Jules Verne

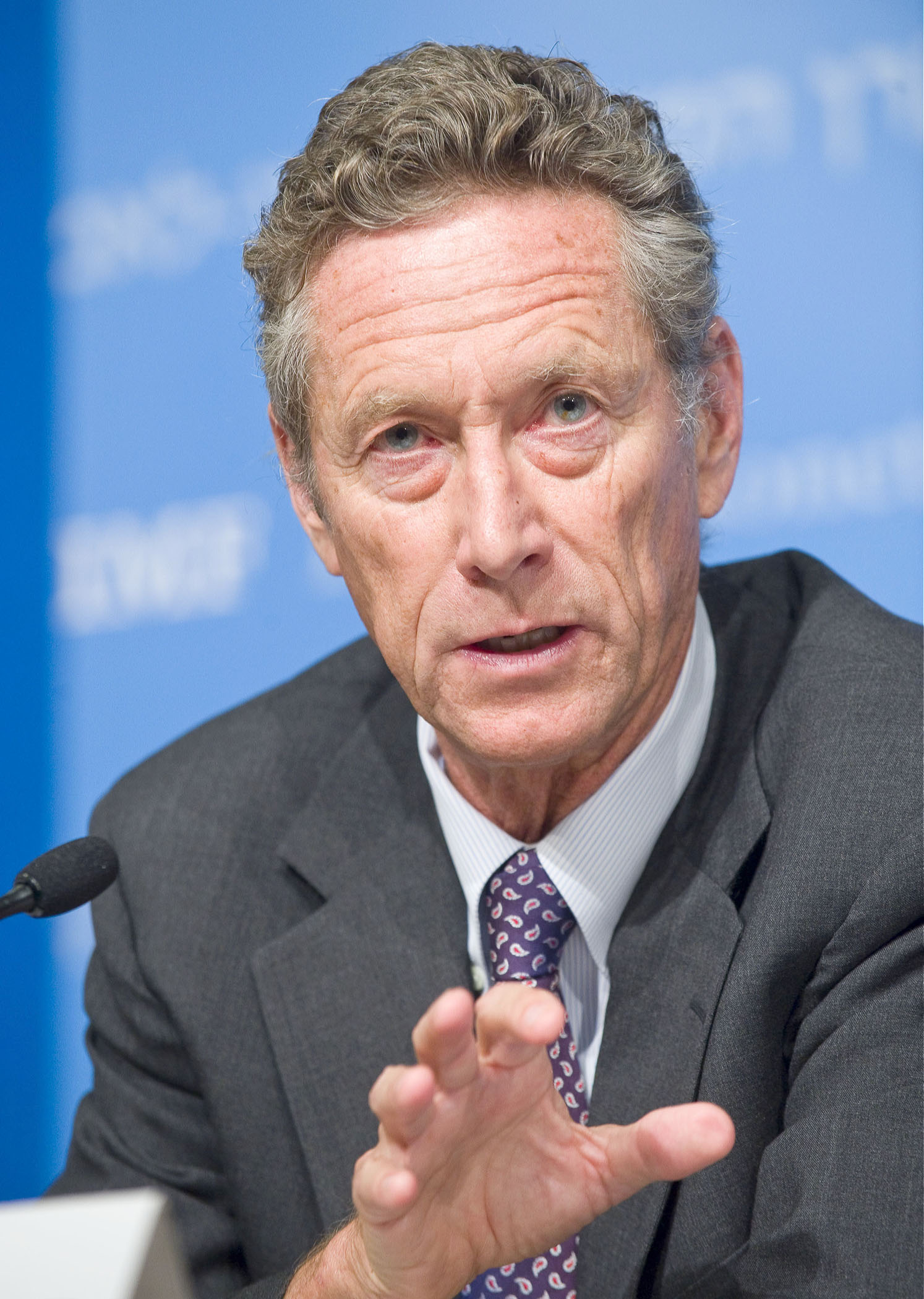
Olivier Blanchard

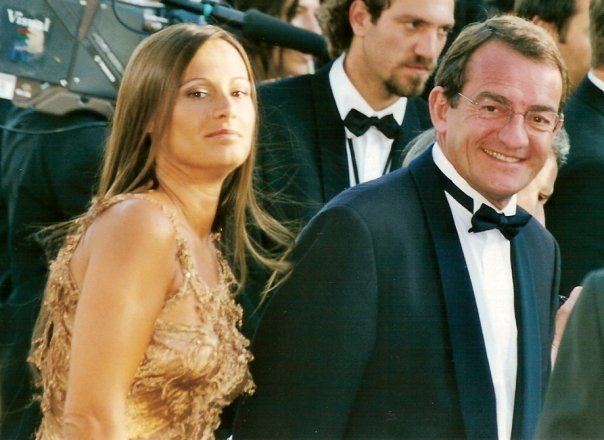
Jean-Pierre Pernaut and his wife

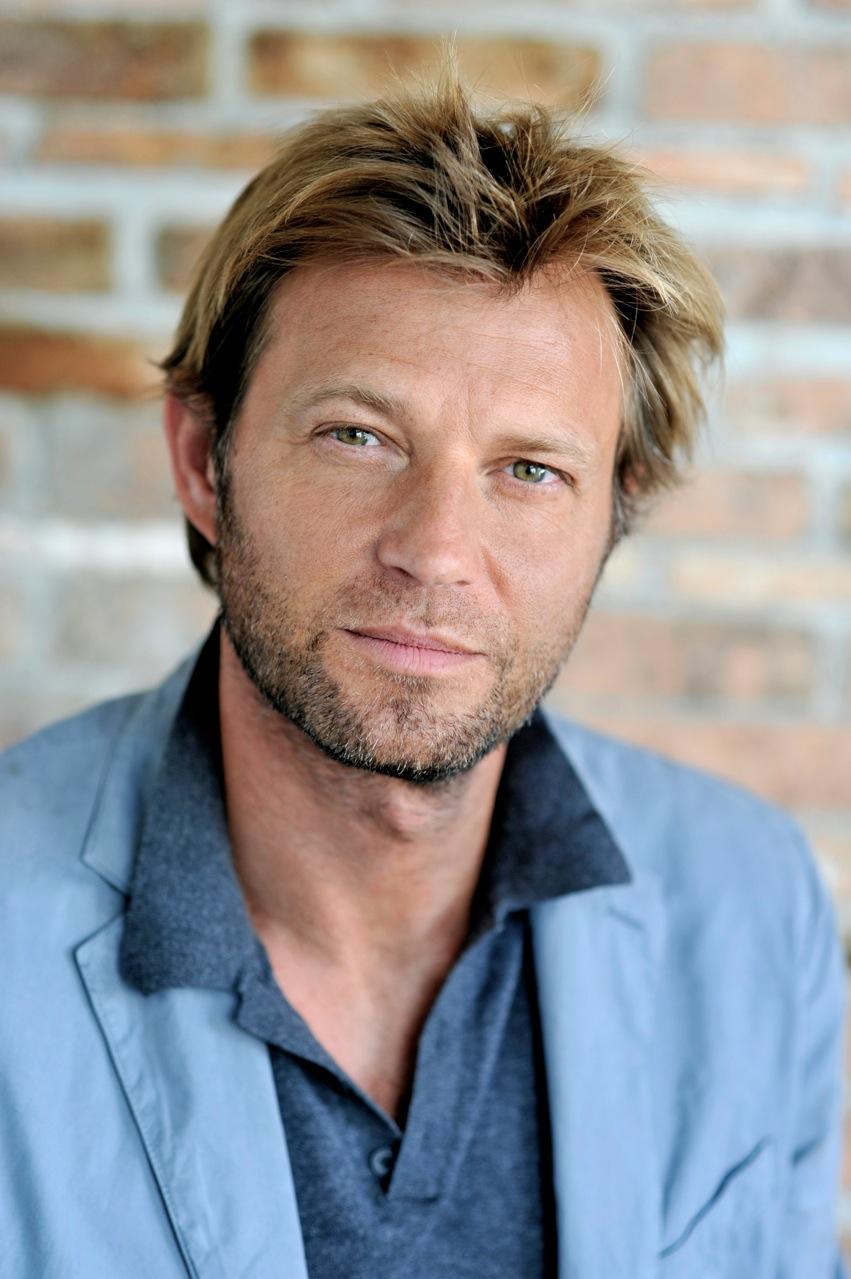
Laurent Delahousse in 2013

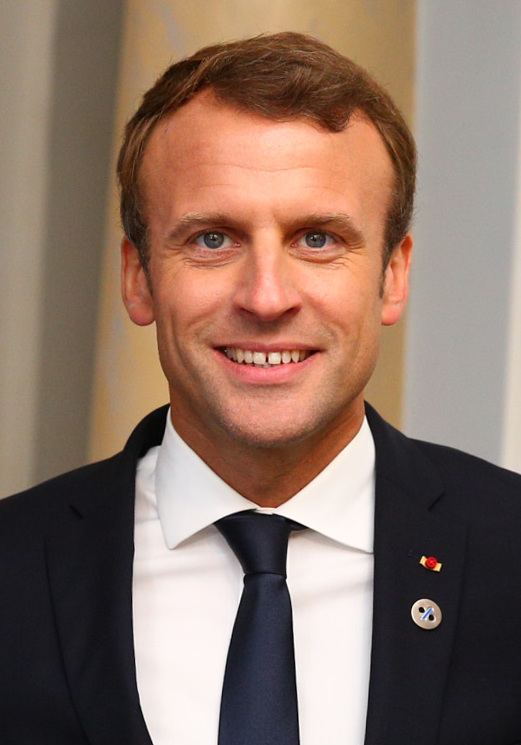
Emmanuel Macron in 2017

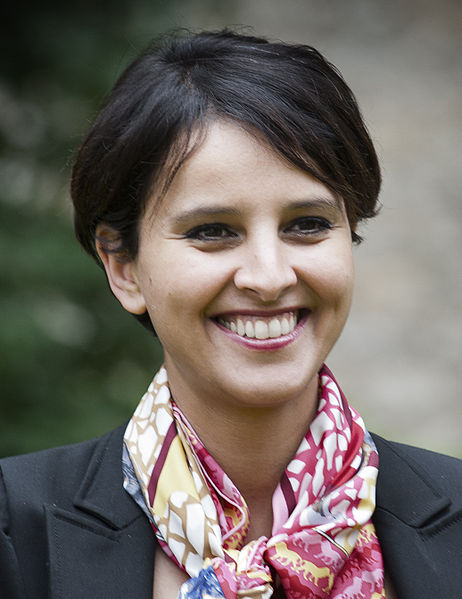
The minister Najat Vallaud-Belkacem in June 2012

- Magnentius (303–353), usurper of the imperial title 18 January 350 to 11 August 353
- Godeberta (640–670), nun and abbess, patron saint of Noyon, France
- Ansgar (801–865), known as Oscar or Ansgar, evangeliser of Scandinavia and patron saint of Denmark
- Peter the Hermit (?–1115), preacher in the First Crusade.
- André d'Ypres, (before 1428–1450), painter and illuminator; La Crucifixion du Parlement de Paris is attributed to him
- Simon Marmion (1425–1489), painter and illuminator
- Michel de Vascosan (1500–1576), king's printer and the University of Paris, bookseller
- Jean Bullant (1515–1578), architect notably of the Château d'Écouen
- François Dubois (1529–1584), painter
- Jean Riolan the Elder (1539–1605), physician, professor of anatomy and Dean of the Faculté de médecine de Paris
- François de Louvencourt (1569–1638), writer, poet and historian
- Nicolas Cornet (1592–1663), Catholic theologian who was one of the main opponents of Jansenism
- Vincent Voiture (1597–1648), known as " le bel esprit " [the beautiful spirit], poet of Un Précieux and academic.
- Nicolas Blasset (1600–1659), sculptor
- Antoine de Cousu (beginning of the 17th–1658), music theorist and composer of church music
- Charles du Fresne, sieur du Cange (1610–1688), historian and philologist.
- Claude François, known in religion as Brother Luc, (1614–1685), painter
- Jacques Rohault (1618–1672), physician and proselyte of Mechanism
- Nicolas Barré (1621–1686), priest and founder of the Sisters of the Infant Jesus, beatified in 1999 by Pope John Paul II
- Charles Aubert de La Chesnaye, (1632–1702), prominent businessman in New France
- Charles Varlet known as La Grange, (1639–1692), comedian who belonged to Molière's company and was one of the most renowned
- Charles Cressent (1685–1768), master cabinetmaker, main representative of Regency style
- Jean-Baptiste Dupuis (1698–1790), sculptor
- Jean-Baptiste Gresset (1709–1777), poet and dramatist, (author of Vert-Vert and Le Méchant), member of the Académie française.
- Jean-Baptiste Vaquette de Gribeauval (1715–1789), officer and engineer who reformed the field artillery of the French army.
- Père Féry (1716–1773), engineer of the château-d'eau
- Joseph Dinouart (1716–1786), preacher, polemicist, compiler of sacred sciences and apologist for French feminism
- Noël François de Wailly (1724–1801), grammarian and lexicographer.
- Louis Antoine Vimeux (1737–1814), general of the Revolution and First Empire, Knight of the Royal order and military of Saint-Louis, Commander of the Légion d'honneur, hereditary baron, Governor of the Place de Luxembourg (from 1802 to 1814)
- Jacques-Firmin Vimeux (1740–1728), sculptor in the Cathedral of Amiens
- Choderlos de Laclos (1741–1803), writer, author of Les Liaisons dangereuses
- Pierre Morand du Puch cadet, (1742–1822), general of the armies of the Revolution, died in Amiens
- Jean Baptiste Joseph Delambre (1749–1822), mathematician, astronomer, historian of astronomy, geodesist and author of the definition of the metre.
- Charles Dallery (1754–1835), mechanical engineer, inventor of the steam engine to tubular boiler
- Jacques-Polycarpe Morgan (1759–1843), general of the armies of the Republic and the Empire, born in Amiens and died at Chamarande (Essonne)
- Charles Guillaume Alexandre Bourgeois (1759–1832), painter, engraver, physicist and chemist
- Pierre Amable Jean-Baptiste Trannoy (1772–1833), botanist, physician and hygienist
- François Marie Clément de La Roncière (1773–1854), general of the armies of the Republic and the Empire (name engraved under the Arc de Triomphe of the Star: 11th column)
- André Marie Constant Duméril (1774–1860), zoologist
- Pierre-François-Marie-Auguste Dejean (1780–1847), general and entomologist
- François-Alexandre Desprez (1778–1833), general of the armies of the Republic and the Empire
- Charles Alexandre (1797–1870), hellenist and lexicographer
- Gédéon de Forceville (1799–1886), sculptor
- Pierre Thuillier, (1799–1859), landscape painter associated with the Barbizon school
- Aimé and Louis Duthoit (1803–1869) & (1807–1874), sculptors who helped the restoration of the cathedral alongside Eugène Viollet-le-Duc which qualified them for this "last image of the Middle Ages"
- Alphonse Sagebien (1807–1892), engineer, inventor of a type of water wheel, alderman from 1878 to 1888
- Édouard Paris (1814–1874), translator in Picard of the Gospel of Matthew
- Antoine Daveluy, (1818–1866), Catholic saint, missionary Bishop in Korea
- Jules Barni (1818–1878), philosopher and politician, Member of Parliament for the Somme
- Eugène Jolibois (1819–1896), politician
- Pierre Puvis de Chavannes (1824–1898), painter, idealistic murals (Panthéon, Sorbonne).
- Ferdinand Pouy (1824–1891), bibliographer died in Amiens
- Albert Dauphin (1827–1898), politician, Minister of Finance in the Government of René Goblet
- René Goblet (1828–1905), journalist and politician, head of the Government, President of the Council, Minister of) the Interior in the Second Government of Charles de Freycinet, Minister for Foreign Affairs in the Government of Charles Floquet>
- Jules Verne (1828–1905), city councillor from 1888 to his death, and before all a writer known to all; he rests in the Cemetery of La Madeleine (Note: He lived for 18 years in a mansion located in Henriville, which includes an observatory atop a tower. His house, now classified as an Historical Monument, was acquired by the city of Amiens in 1980. Reopened on 24 March 2006 after a year of work, the Jules Verne House is a museum. The University of Picardie is called "Jules Verne". A viaduct east of the city and a lecture hall of ESIEE also bear his name.)
- Charles Tellier (1828–1913), inventor of artificial refrigeration
- Gédéon Baril (1832–1906), cartoonist
- Frédéric Petit (1836–1895), Mayor of Amiens and Third Republic Senator of the Somme
- Édouard Lucas (1842–1891), inventor of mathematical games and puzzles
- Édouard Branly (1844–1940), physicist, inventor of the coherer, the first very sensitive detector of radio waves and physician. A high school as well as a lecture hall, one of the ESIEE, bear his name
- Victorine Autier (1840–1874), heroic nurse of the War of 1870
- Paul Bourget (1852–1935), writer and member of the Académie française.
- Georges Picquart (1854-1914), general, Minister of War and French politician. He played a central role in the Dreyfus affair and provides evidence of the innocence of Alfred Dreyfus.
- Louis Thuillier (1856–1883) physicist and biologist, born and studied at Amiens, buried in the cemetery of La Madeleine
- Albert Roze (1861–1952), sculptor
- Eugène Cosserat (1866–1931) mathematician and astronomer
- Lucien Lecointe (1867–1940), politician
- Mathilde Auguez (1858–1955), light soprano
- Henri Ardel (1863-1938), writer
- Victor Pauchet (1869–1936), surgeon; a clinic founded in 1896 and a square bear his name
- Victor-Ferdinand Bourgeois (1870–1957), painter and illustrator.
- Joseph Pinchon (1871–1953), cartoonist, creator of Bécassine
- Auguste Sérieyx (1865–1949), musicologist, composer
- Germaine Dulac (1882–1942), film director, film theorist
- Henri Deberly (1882–1947), writer, winner of the Prix Goncourt in 1926
- Clovis Brunel (1884–1971), philologist
- Roland Dorgelès (1885–1973), writer
- Clovis Trouille (1889–1975), painter
- Alphonse Métérié (1887–1967), poet
- Jean Catelas (1894–1941), member of Amiens in 1936, guillotined on 24 September 1941, under the regime of Philippe Pétain
- Alfred Georges Regner (1902–1987), painter, engraver
- Odette Hallowes (1912–1995), World War II heroine
- Léon Lamotte (1912–2011), sculptor
- François Spoerry (1912–1999), architect, originally behind the construction of the tower created by Auguste Perret in Amiens
- Dolorès Vanetti (1912–2008), actress, poet
- Madeleine Michelis (1913–1944), World War II resistant
- Maurice Boitel 1919–2007, painter, lived at 65 Rue Richard de Fournival
- Jeanne Joulain (1920–2010), classical organist
- Florien Decodavaine (1920–1942), painter hermit, resistant during the World War II
- Philippe Pinchemel (1923–2008), geographer
- Roger Agache (1926–2011), archaeologist, pioneer of aerial archaeology
- Pierre Garnier, (1928–2014), poet, creator of spatialism
- Jean-Jacques Perrey (1929–2016), electronic music performer, composer, and producer
- Véronique Silver (1931–2010), actress
- Michou (1931–2020), director of the Cabaret Michou in Paris
- Jacques Darras (1939–), poet, essayist and translator
- Sylvain Cambreling (1948–), conductor
- Olivier Blanchard (1949–), Chief Economist at the International Monetary Fund, Professor at the MIT
- Philippe Dessaint (1953–), journalist, former director of FR3 Picardie
- Jean-Pierre Pernaut (1950–2022), journalist, television host
- Bernard Devauchelle (1950–), professor of medicine
- Geneviève Fioraso (1954–), Minister of Higher Education and Research in the Jean-Marc Ayrault Governments I and II, Secretary of State responsible for Higher Education and Research in the First and Second Valls Government
- Ivar Ch'Vavar (1951–), creative poet of the L'Invention de la Picardie
- Éric Carreel (1959–), engineer and entrepreneur
- Frank Berton (1962–), lawyer
- Liêm Hoang Ngoc (1964–), economist and politician
- Anne Brochet (1966–), actress
- Jeanne Savary (1966–), comedian
- Éric Berger (1969–), actor
- Philippe Leclerc (1969–), footballer
- Pierre Notte (1969–), playwright, Director and former Secretary general of the Comédie-Française
- Albin de la Simone (1970–), musician, singer-songwriter
- Emmanuel Macron (1977–), President of France
- Najat Vallaud-Belkacem (1977–), Minister of Women's Affairs and spokesperson for the Government in the Government of Jean-Marc Ayrault; grew up in Amiens and is a graduate of the University of Picardie
- Disiz (1978–), rapper, writer and actor
- Raphaël Poulain (1980–), actor and Rugby Union player
- François-Henri Désérable (1987–), writer and ice hockey player
- Olympe (1989–), singer

==== Sportspeople ====
- Pierre Baruzy, (1897–1994), boxer and Savate coach; between 1922 and 1935, he was crowned 11 times as middleweight champion of France
- Urbain Wallet, (1899–1973), footballer
- Robert Marchand, (1911–), world record holder of the fastest centenarian cycling 100 km
- Alfred Letourneur, (1907–1975), cyclist, world speed record holder on flat ground and behind shelter
- Georges Vallerey, (1927–1954), swimmer, Olympic medalist
- Pal Benko (1928–2019), chess grandmaster
- Gisèle Vallerey, (1930–2010), swimmer
- Bernard Quennehen, (1930–), cyclist
- Michel Macquet, (1932–2002), javelin thrower
- Jean-Luc Van Den Heede, (1945–), sailor, sailing single-handed world record holder
- Pierre Mankowski, (1951–), football player and manager
- Daniel Senet, (1953–), weightlifter, Olympic medalist
- Chantal Langlacé, (1955–), long-distance runner, former holder of the world record for the marathon
- Antoine Richer, (1961–), ice hockey player
- François Farout, (1963–), table tennis player, triple champion of France and European champion by team in 1984
- Christophe Léotard (1966–), chess grandmaster
- Étienne Thobois, (1967–), badminton player
- Gérald Baticle, (1969–), football player and manager
- Nicolas Chatelain, (1970–), table tennis player
- Philippe Gaumont, (1973–2013), cyclist
- Marie Collonvillé, (1973–), heptathlete
- Éric Chaulvet, (1974–), basketball player
- Franck Perque, (1974–), cyclist, double world track cycling champion
- Amélie Cocheteux, (1978–), tennis player
- Mathieu Mille, (1981–), ice hockey player
- Julie Coin, (1982–), tennis player
- Cédric Ouattara, (1983–), footballer
- Yannick Salem, (1983–), footballer
- Kévin Hecquefeuille, (1984–), ice hockey player
- Lucie Louette Kanning, (1985–), judoka
- Thomas Roussel, (1985–), ice hockey player
- Brian Henderson, (1986–), ice hockey player
- Caroline Loir, (1988–), canoeist
- Pierre Soudry, (1988–), handballer
- Jérémy Stravius, (1988–), swimmer, Olympic champion
- Greg Houla, (1988–), footballer
- Yohan M'Vila, (1988–), footballer
- Dorian N'Goma, (1988–), footballer
- Grégory Beron, (1989–), ice hockey player
- Princesse Goubo, (1991–), basketball player
- Yann M'Vila, (1990–), footballer
- Rudy Gobert, (1992–), basketball player
- Clément Chevrier, (1992–), cyclist
- Mélanie Henique, (1992), butterfly swimmer
- Corentin Ermenault, (1996–), cyclist

==== Linked to the city ====
- Saint Martin (died 397), Roman soldier, shared his coat with a beggar in Amiens in a gesture which has been remembered
- Saint Honoré (died ca.600), Bishop of Amiens and Patron Saint of bakers
- Lafleur, hero and main character of puppet Amiens "Chés cabotans".
- Jean-Marie Roland de La Platière (1734–1793), Economist and statesman, lived in Amiens and was Inspector of factories in the city.
- Antoine Parmentier, (1737–1813), military pharmacist, agronomist, nutritionist and hygienist. Member of the Academy of sciences of Amiens, he popularized the consumption of potatoes
- Jacques Delille or Abbé Delille, (1738–1813), poet and translator, a member of the French Academy, was a professor at the college of Amiens
- Jean-Baptiste Lamarck (1744–1829), naturalist who laid the foundations of the theory of the evolution of species.
- Jean-Baptiste Cousin de Grainville, (1746–1805), philosopher, poet, priest in Amiens and pioneer of fantasy literature
- Madame Roland (1754–1793), figure of the French Revolution, face of the Girondist party, lived in Amiens
- Marguerite Georges, (1787–1867), famous actress, lived at Amiens and began her career there
- Camille Léon de Chassepot de Beaumont, (1808–1893), colonel in the National Guard who, under his command, distinguished himself on 17 November 1870
- Jules Lefebvre, (1836–1911), painter, student of the École nationale supérieure des Beaux-Arts of Amiens
- Jón Sveinsson, (1857–1944), Icelandic priest and author of popular children's books, studied and did his novitiate in Amiens

Marie Denizard (1872-1959), in January 1913, the first woman to stand as a candidate in a French presidential election. Lived in Amiens as an adult

- Auguste Perret, (1874–1954), architect, creator of the Tour Perret
- Jean Moulin (1899–1943), prefect and resistant, was Secretary general of the prefecture of Somme
- Philippe Leclerc de Hauteclocque (1902–1947), Marshal of France, began his studies at the college of the Providence
- Alfred Manessier, (1911–1993), painter, pupil of the École des beaux-arts of Amiens
- Robert Mallet, (1915–2002), civil servant, writer and man of French radio, founder and Rector of the Academy of Amiens
- Jacques Le Goff, (1924–2014), medievalist historian, he taught at the Lycée Louis-Thuillier
- Alain Bombard, (1924–2005), medical biologist and navigator, lived in Amiens for twenty years
- André Crépin (1928–2013), essayist, linguist and medievalist, Member of the Académie des Inscriptions et Belles-Lettres, lived in Amiens
- Gilbert Richard, (1928–), television producer and host on the first television channel (1960–1992)
- Vladimir Volkoff, (1932–2005), writer, lived in Amiens
- Stéphane Le Foll, (1960–), politician, Minister of agriculture in Jean-Marc Ayrault I and II, Manuel Valls I and II Governments, graduated from the agricultural college of Amiens Le Paraclet
- Grégoire Delacourt, (1960–), writer, had part of his studies at the school of Providence in Amiens
- Catherine Fleury-Vachon, (1966–), judoka, Olympic champion; head of the "pôle Espoirs" of Amiens un 1998–2005
- Frédéric Cuvillier, (1968–), politician, Deputy Minister of transport and maritime economy in Jean-Marc Ayrault I and II, Manuel Valls I Governments, graduated in law at the University of Picardy
- Laurent Delahousse (1969–), journalist and television presenter, grew up in Amiens
- Pascale Boistard, (1971–), politician, Secretary of State for the rights of women in the Second Valls Government, Member of Parliament for Somme's 1st constituency (Northern Amiens)
- Benjamin Biolay, (1973–), singer-songwriter, lived in Amiens
- Miss Kittin, (1973–), DJ, studied in Amiens
- Élodie Gossuin-Lacherie, (1980–), television presenter, radio host, Miss France and Miss Europe 2001, registered at the Picardy regional Council since 2004.
- Nicolas Duvauchelle, (1980–), actor and model, has lived in Amiens
- Édouard Louis, (1992–), writer and academic, studied at the Lycée Madeleine Michelis and the University of Picardy

=== Heraldry, logo and motto ===
Arms of Amiens	The arms of Amiens are blazoned : "Of gules to ivy of argent, the chief azure sown of fleurs-de-lis Or." Motto: "Liliis tenaci vimine jungor", which means 'a strong bond unites the lilies'. Amiens, a fortress city, suffered attacks and resisted, staying French. Its coat of arms symbolise this attachment to France, commitment symbolised by ivy. France being symbolised by the seedlings of fleurs-de-lis authorised by the Kings of France.

In the full arms of the city, holding and support are two unicorns, support is of acanthus leaves, while the crest is a castle keep of five parts. The two figures emblazoned in the arms of Amiens are lily and ivy, which today still decorate the city logo. The unicorn is a symbol of the knightly virtues of purity and attraction to beauty and delicacy. Even today, the unicorn makes a number of references in the city: The eponymous stadium, the coat of arms of the Amiens football team as well as the award of the Amiens International Film Festival.

Logo of the city of Amiens

In 1991, the municipality formed around Gilles de Robien designed a new logo, incorporating the Fleur-de-lis and the Ivy leaf present on the coat of arms, placed side by side in red with a background of grey or white, depending on usage.

- A stamp representing the arms of the city was issued in 1962, this issue fitted into one of the Arms of cities. Its power of postage was five cents. It was issued on 23 January 1962 and withdrawn from sale on 23 January 1977. A first day was arranged in Amiens on 21 July 1962. It was designed by Robert Louis. Artist Arman made a board collage of this stamp.

== See also ==
Culture: Amiens International Film Festival; Lafleur et les Théâtres Amiénois de Cabotins; Musée de l'Hôtel de Berny; Musée de Picardie; Economy: Gueudet; Yvert et Tellier; Education: ESIEE Amiens; University of Picardie (or University of Picardie Jules-Verne, UPJV)	History: Acheulean; Ambiani; Battle of Amiens (1870); Battle of Amiens (1918); Charter of Amiens; Roman Catholic Diocese of Amiens; Mise of Amiens; History of Amiens; Operation Jericho; Treaty of Amiens (1802); Siege of Amiens (1597); Treaty of Amiens (1279); Treaty of Amiens (1423)	Architectural heritage: Amiens Cathedral; Tour Perret; Politics and administration: Arrondissement of Amiens; Communauté d'agglomération Amiens Métropole; Communes of the Somme department; Somme; Picardy	Sport: Amiens SC; AC Amiens; Coliséum; Hockey Club Amiens Somme; Amiens Spartiates; Stade de la Licorne; Transport: Amiens – Glisy Aerodrome; Gare d'Amiens; Gare Saint-Roch; LGV Paris – London via Amiens; Roissy–Picardie Link
