= Compagnie d'Arc d'Amiens =

French archery club

- Full name: Compagnie Fondamentale des Chevaliers et Archers d'Amiens
- Sport: Archery
- Founded: 14 November 1803
- Based in: Amiens
- Location: 15 rue de Lannoy; Amiens; France
- CEO: Paul Foulon
- Affiliation: Fédération française de tir à l'arc
- Members: 91 (2012)
- Label FFTA: (bronze) Label Bronze
- Website: cie-arc-amiens.com

The Compagnie d'Arc d'Amiens is an archery club founded on 14 November 1803 in Amiens and affiliated to the Fédération française de tir à l'arc and the Fédération française handisport.

== History ==
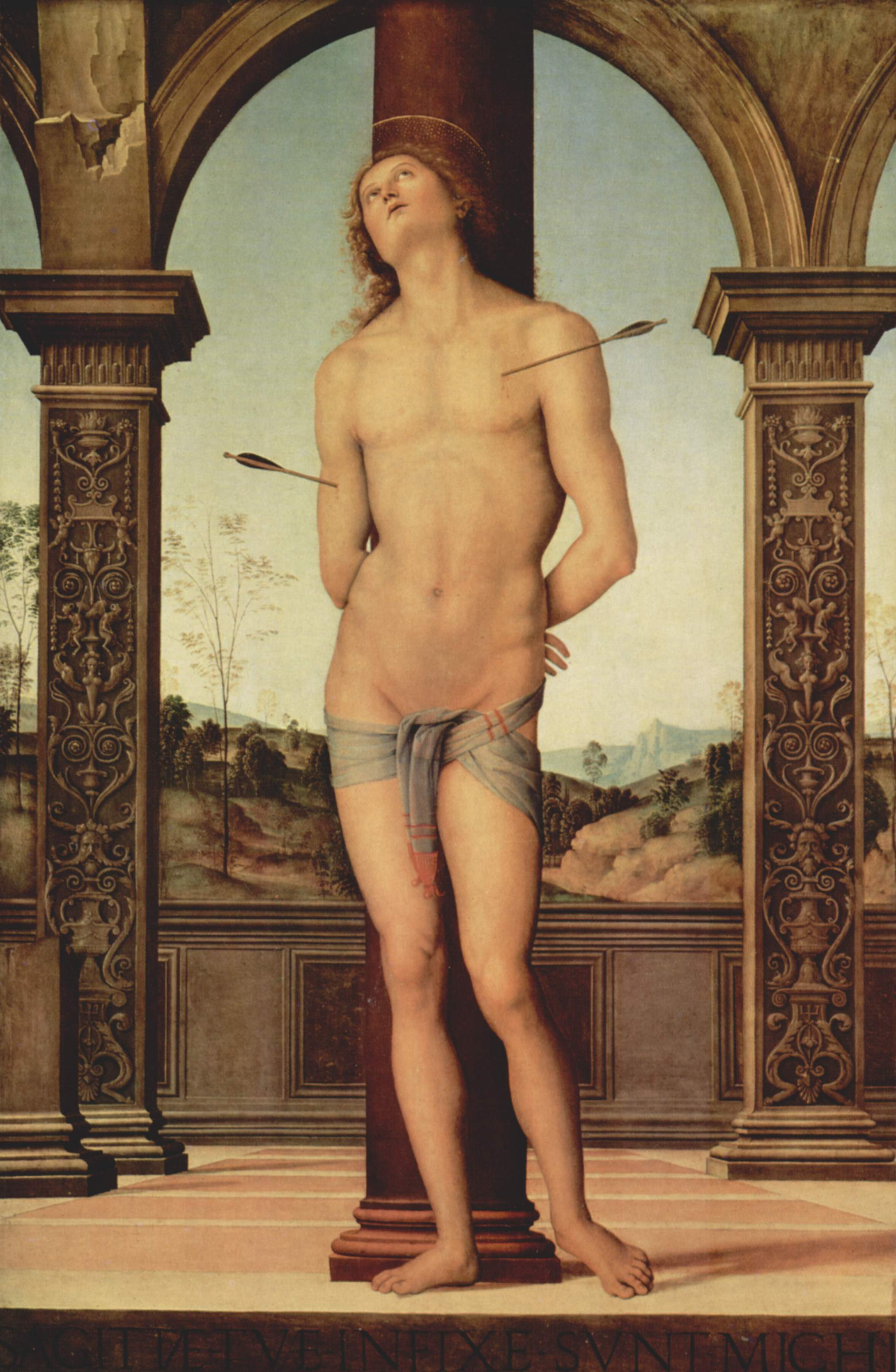
Pietro Perugino, representation of Saint Sebastian (around 1500), Paris, Louvre.

=== Urban Militia ===
The armed troops were instituted for the defense and the police of the city of Amiens shortly after 1117, following the victory of the rebels against the seigniorial tyranny. The archers of the urban militia of Amiens were grouped in a group called the Grand Oath (Grand Serment), which consisted of 90 men recruited from the most notable families of the bourgeoisie. On an unknown date, perhaps towards the end of the fifteenth century, a Little Oath (Petit Serment) was made up, made up of 60 men. The members of the Oaths had to swear during their admissions to respect the Statutes of the group, the authority of the Captain and that of the city's Mayor. These 150 archers formed, with 60 crossbowmen, the specialized troops of the small municipal army. With the advent of firearms at the end of the 16th century, 60 arquebusiers and 80 couleuvriniers were added to their ranks.

The Oaths were religious associations placed under the patronage of Saint Sebastian for the Grand Oath and Saint Christine for the Petit Oath, both killed by being riddled with arrows. The "Grand Oath" celebrated a solemn mass on the day of its patron, 20 January, on the left side altar of the Église Saint-Leu d'Amiens.

The archers of the city were deployed in the service of the King on numerous occasions, in particular at the battle of Bouvines in 1214. During the Hundred Years' War, they were opposed several times, to the English archers, better armed, their bows being high two meters allowed their arrows to be sent over two hundred meters.

The Garden of the Grand Oath (Jardin du Grand Serment) is located against the ramparts from the 15th century to 1790, today from the Baraban bridge to the Célestins bridge. The Tir à l'oiseau (Bird shooting) was practiced there, then after the seventeenth century the Tir au berceau. The name of the rue des Archers (Archer's street) is a last memory of this garden. In this place, the militia organized once a year a contest whose goal was to touch a 3D representation of a bird, the first archer to succeed was named Roy for the year. If an archer succeeded three years in a row, he became Emperor. These titles gave rise to honors and privileges. This discipline is still practiced today, a title of Roitelet was even added for young people.

Peaceful meetings took place between Oaths from different cities, even distant ones. These games were called the Noble Days (Nobles jours). The messenger bringing the invitation received gifts, money or jewels from the municipality.

=== Privileged company ===
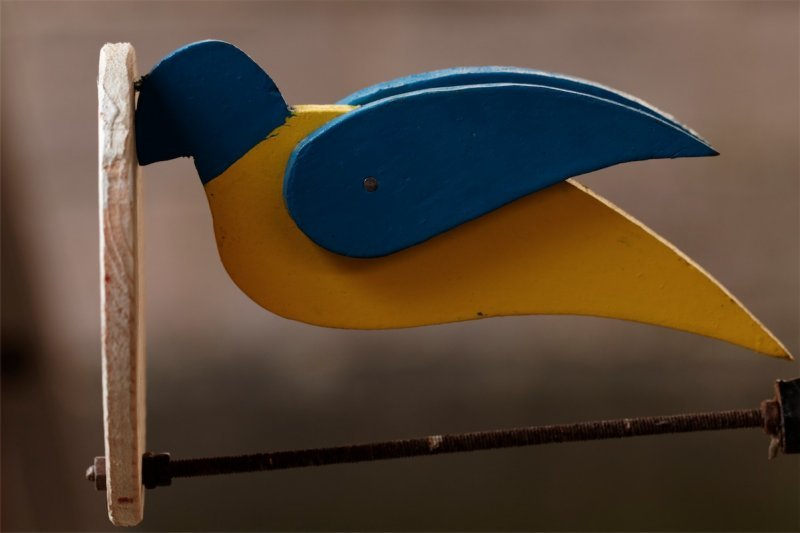
Wood bird used for the Tir à l'oiseau.

The progress of armaments involves the disappearance of the bow in favor of the arquebus. Archers were still commissioned at the time of Louis XIV, notably at the siege of Arras, Saint-Omer or Dunkirk, but only to escort prisoners or ammunition convoy.

The Oath loses its militia status and becomes a privileged Company. The advantages of archers are however maintained: exemptions from taxes and charges, watchtower, accommodation for warriors. They benefited in particular from the Franc salé (salty Franc): they did not pay, on the salt they bought, the heavy tax of Gabelle du sel. These advantages had made them called the Franc-archer. In return, the city only asked them for fairly sparse police or ceremonial services. They must place themselves at the disposal of the authority in case of alarms, fires, riots ... They take rank in uniform with their weapons at religious or civil events: Feast of Corpus Christi, Saint John's Eve, Te Deum and fireworks on anniversary of victories, entries of great figures...

The archers no longer wore either helmets or chain mail, but a white cloth coat with blue faces trimmed with silver; blue vest, panties and stockings; white and blue plumed tricorne; white wool epaulettes; the sword at the side; on the chest, a medal bearing the image of Saint Sebastian.

During the parade, at the head of their procession, we find the drums and the fifes followed by the Banner Holder. The banner embroidered with the date of 1733 has entered the Musée de Picardie.

During 17th century the Tir au Berceau became a regular practice, but the annual Tir à l'oiseau competition was maintained. Meetings with foreign companies are no longer called Noble Days, but Provincial Prices or General Prices, depending on the distance from the participating cities.

While the old Statutes were drawn up by each Oath and therefore differed from city to city, a common law was accepted by almost all the Companies in the 18th century. It is still in place today after some modifications over time. It is the General Regulations in 70 articles, published in 1733 by Henri Charles Arnauld de Pomponne, Abbot of Saint-Médard de Soissons, who qualified himself as Grand Master of the Archery of the Arc in France because the relics of Saint Sebastian were brought to his Abbey in 840.

The French Revolution suppressed all associations. The Privileged Companies were dissolved on June 13, 1790 and their property was sold on January 16, 1792.

=== Sport Association ===
At the beginning of the 19th century, the archers regrouped in a Society for leisure and sports. The Fundamental Company of the Knights and Archers of Amiens (Compagnie fondamentale des chevaliers et archers d'Amiens) was created on November 14, 1803, by the descendants of Officers of the Company of the 18th century, Gérard and Madaré.

The city of Amiens owned up to four associations of archers simultaneously. When the train station was established in 1845, railway workers formed a Société du Nord (Society of North) which had land at the corner of the Voirie and Boulevard de l'Est (currently Boulevard d'Alsace Lorraine). This society was fleeting. Another society, the Francs Archers, celebrates its patronal feast on the same day at the Église Saint-Jacques d'Amiens.

In 1903, for the centenary of the reorganization of the company, a banner is offered to them, it will be blessed by the Daveluy abbey.

The Fundamental Company of the Knights and Archers of Amiens remains the company which has known how to last over time despite the changes of premises. It had to change its location, staying in turn: at Bastion de Longueville, Rue du Vivier, near by Boulevard Fontaine (currently Boulevard Carnot), on Bastion de Guyencourt, in the old ditch against Boulevard Saint-Jacques (currently Boulevard Faidherbe). In 1913, the patron of Amiens Edmond Soyez financed the current stand, 15 rue de Lannoy.

The archer no longer has a uniform, but he must wear a cap decorated with a few archery emblems. Companies are federated into Regional Rounds: that of Amiens is part of the Ronde de Picardie formed by 24 Companies. In all the Rounds, each year the clubs organize the Bouquet Provincial in turn. This celebration is the opening day of a competition between Companies of the Round which takes place every Sunday of the summer. The first was organized in 1903 for the centenary of the Company.

=== Today ===
Currently, the club is affiliated to the Fédération française de tir à l'arc which awarded it the Bronze Label. The official club outfit is white pants, a white polo shirt, with the club logo on the chest and Amiens written in red on the back.

In 2012, the club had 95 licensees.

== Organization ==
- Captain / President: Paul Foulon
- Lieutenant / Vice-President: Claude Cagé
- Treasurer: Christian Trefcon
- Vice-Treasurer: Arnaud Jesson
- Secretary: Elise Foulon
- Vice-Secretary: Nathalie Dupont
- Board's members:
  - Christine Thomas
  - Eric Cadran
  - Gautier Gente
  - Pascal Gerbet
  - Laurent Coffinier
  - Sébastien Tétu

=== Formers Captains ===
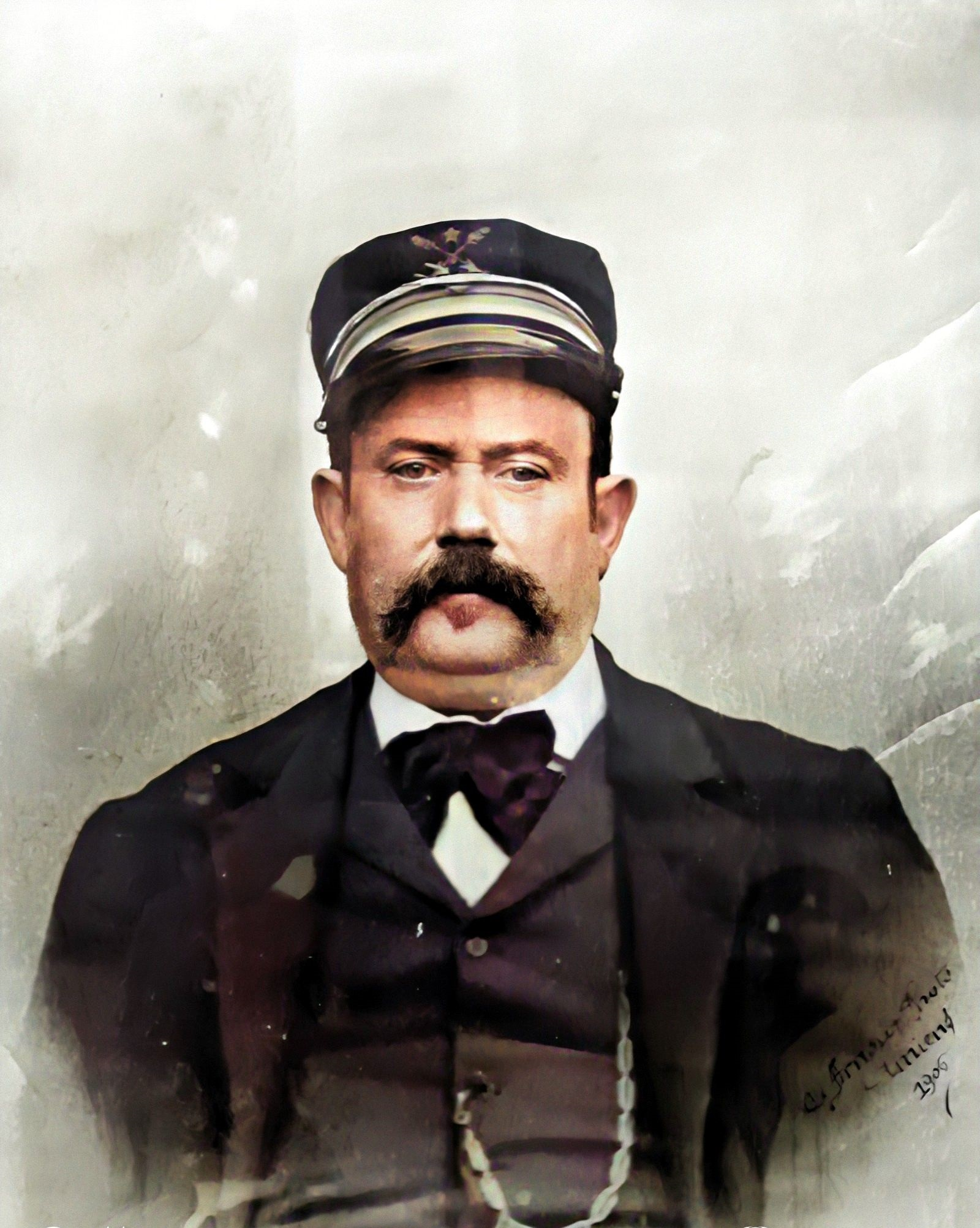
Elie Goubet, captain of the Compagnie d'arc d'Amiens from 1898 to 1899 and from 1904 to 1905.

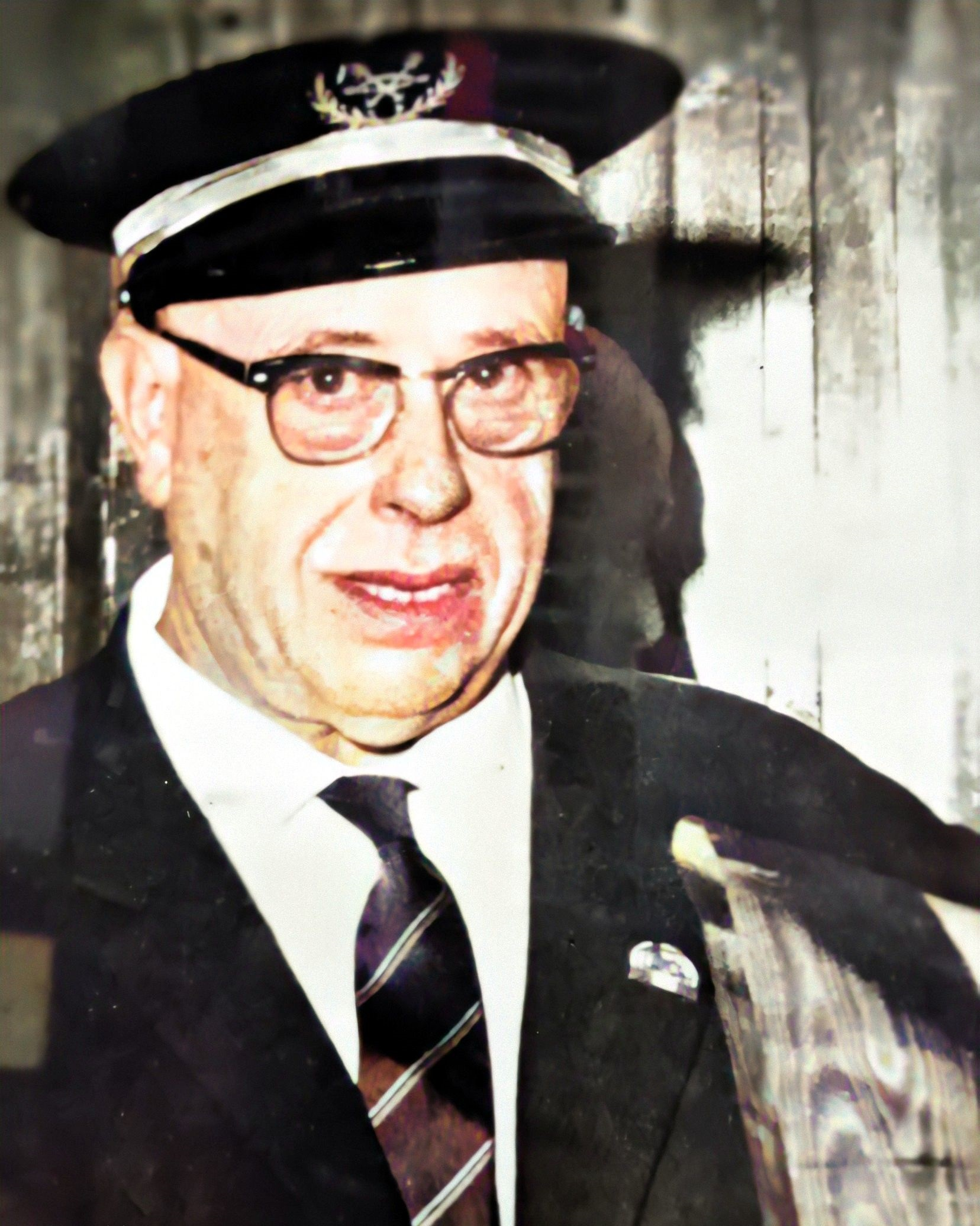
Germain Magnier, captain from 1951 to 1974 and connétable of the Compagnie d'arc d'Amiens.

Former captains of the privileg company
Beginning	End	Name
	1790	Théodore Joseph Gérard

Former captains of the Compagnie d'arc d'Amiens
Beginning	End	Name
1803	1806	Picard Binard
1806	1822	Roussel
1822	1835	Joron
1835	1836	Hubault
1836	1837	Serres
1837	1841	Pierre Hubault
1841	1844	Louis Garaux
1844	1846	Harlay
1846	1851	Adolphe Hubault
1851	1852	Garaux
1852	1853	Daugez
1853	1854	Laborie
1854	1869	Père Julien
1869	1870	Napoléon Duriez
1870	1881	Père Maintenez
1881	1882	Julien
1882	1887	Père Maintenez
1887	1888	Victor Maintenay
1888	1893	Napoléon Duriez
1893	1898	Emile Vaquez
1898	1899	Elie Goubet
1899	1902	Emile Vaquez
1902	1904	Emile Vandekerkove
1904	1905	Elie Goubet
1905	1921	Fernand Desprez
1921	1923	Fernand Desprez
1923	1945	Fernand Desprez
1935	1939	Daniel Vandekerkhove (Note: The archives of the company are incomplete, they establish a presidency of Fernand Desprez between 1923 and 1945. But the newspaper articles establish that Daniel Vandekerkhove is president at least between 1935 and 1939.)
1945	1951	Victor Lefevre
1951	1974	Germain Magnier
1974	1995	Marcel Lucas
1995	2002	Michel Warluzelle

== Events ==
The club organize an indoor, an outdoor/Fédéral and a field competition every year, usually in the Samara Arboretum, and a junior competition.

=== Internal events ===
Each year a tir à l'oiseau (shooting bird) take place to determine the Roy of the compagny. Sinde 1978, this competition is also open to children who can become Roitelet(te). A variant has also been created for compound bows, the winner win a K d'or.

=== Bouquet provincial ===
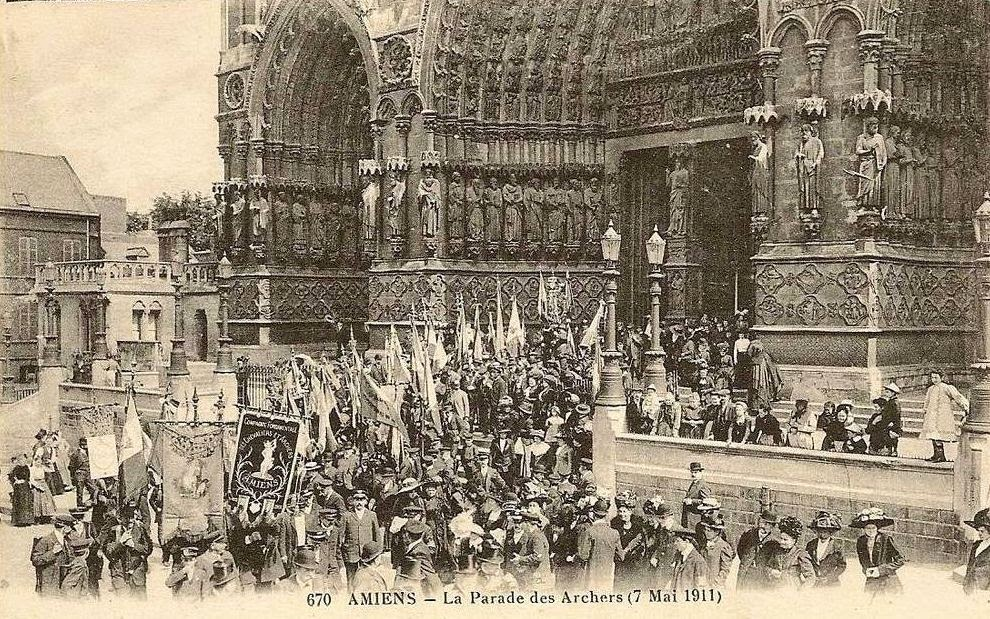
Amiens, Bouquet provincial de 1911

The bouquet provincial (provincial bouquet) has been organized in Amiens five times, in 1893, 1899, 1903, 1911 and 1939.

In 1899, 100 companies participate with a total of 1500 archers.

On 7 June 1903, the Compagnie d'Arc d'Amiens organize the bouquet provincial with the assistance of the 'Union des francs-archers. 150 companies were at the parade.

On 7 May 1911, the parade take place in front of Amiens Cathedral.

=== Championnat de France 2012 ===
From 29 August to 1 September 2012, the Compagnie d'Arc d'Amiens organizes the French Archery Championships at the Hippodrome du petit Saint-Jean. This is the first France championship organized in Amiens. The company receives the 2012 sports event award (prix de la manifestation sportive 2012) for this event. The results for Recurve bow are:

Championnat de France 2012's results, organised in Amiens
Category	Rank	Archer	Club
Femmes	(gold) Médaille d'or	Cyrielle Cotry	Les Archers de Compiègne
Femmes	(silver) Médaille d'argent	Bérengère Schuh	La Sentinelle de Brienon sur Armançon
Femmes	(bronze) Médaille de bronze	Sophie Dodémont	Compagnie d'arc de Villiers-le-Bel
Hommes	(gold) Médaille d'or	Thomas Faucheron	Compagnie d’archers de Rennes
Hommes	(silver) Médaille d'argent	Gaël Prévost	Les Archers riomois
Hommes	(bronze) Médaille de bronze	Romain Girouille	Compagnie d’archers de Rennes

== Infrastructures ==
=== Jeu d'arc ===
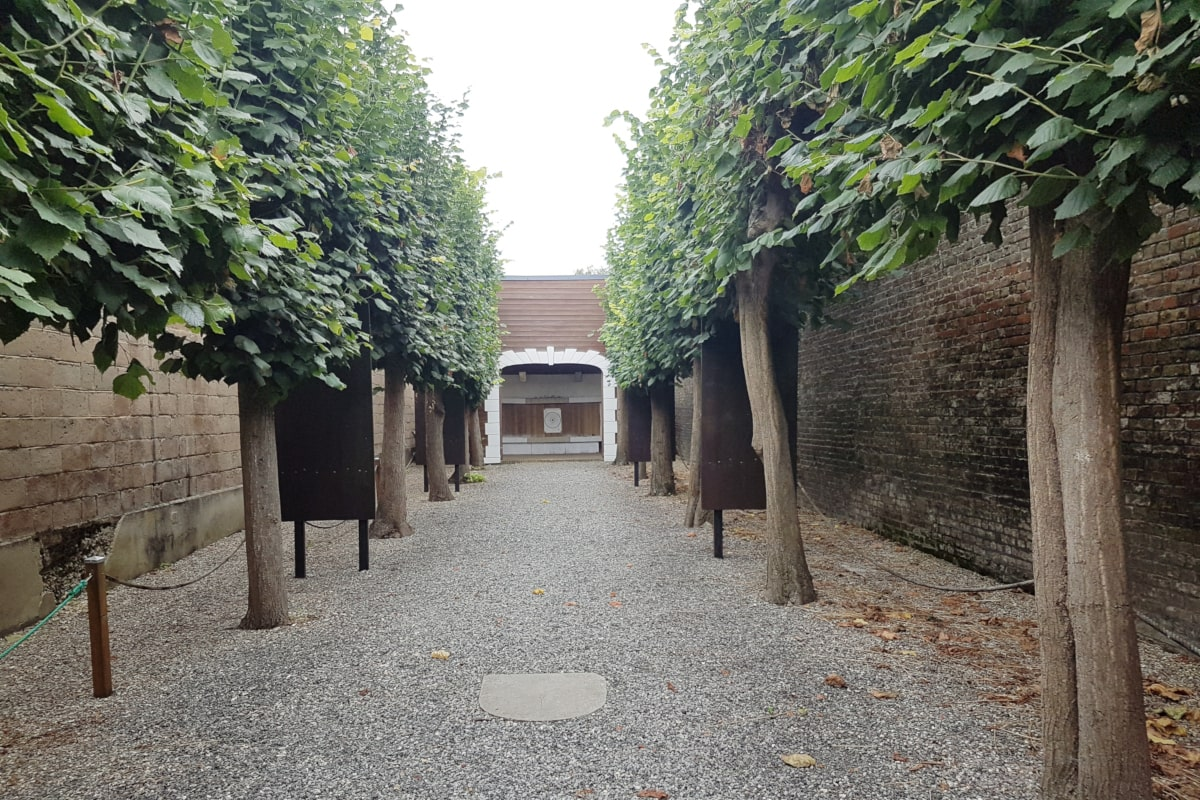
Jeu d'Arc of the Compagnie d'Arc d'Amiens

Since 1913, thanks to the patron Edmond Soyez, the association's head office is located at 15 rue de Lannoy in Amiens. The second jeu d'arc was offered to the company by the constable Gérard De Berny (1880-1957). As the association is the owner, the training sessions are open to the public without any schedule restrictions for club members. This place includes a salle d'armes (weapon's room) where archers can mount their bows, and 2 jeu d'arc with a distance of about 50 meters each. The total length of this place is therefore about 120 meters. For a width of about 8 meters, the land being located between the houses.

=== Gymnasium ===
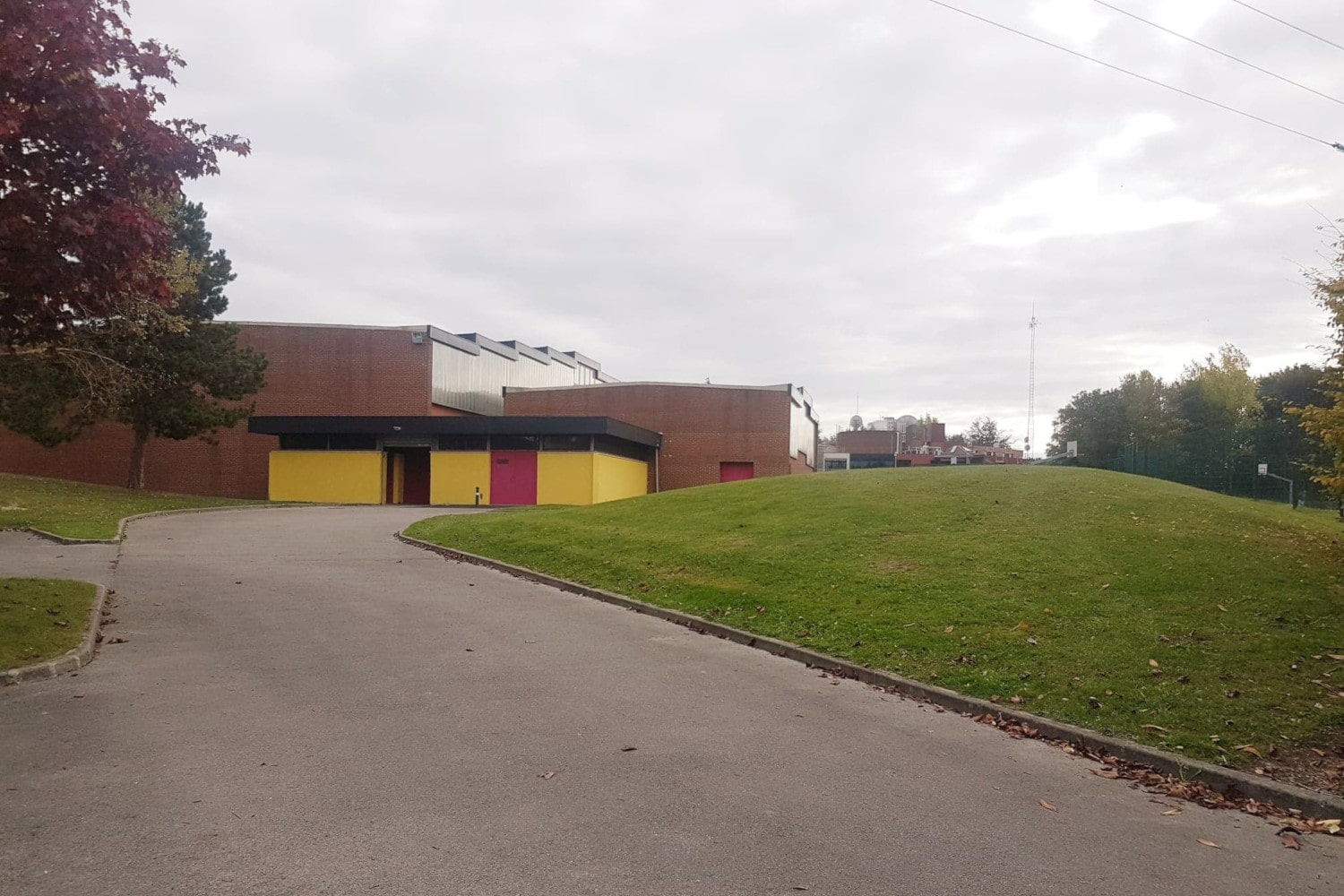
Gymnasium Jean Renaux in Amiens

For the winter season, trainings sessions takes place at the Jean Renaux gymnasium in the north district of Amiens. Its length allows shots up to 40 meters. The indoor competitions organized during the year by the club generally take place in this gymnasium.

== Honours ==
(Note: For international or university competitions, archers were members of the club during the championship.)

=== National ===
==== Championnat de France de tir fédéral ====
Year	Archer	Rank	Category
2000	Justine Cotrel	(gold) 1	Cadette Women - Recurve
2000	Céline Garçon	(silver) 2	Junior Women - Recurve
2001	Marian Dode	(gold) 1	Benjamin Men - Recurve
2001	Céline Garçon	(gold) 1	Junior Women - Recurve

==== Championnat de France de tir nature ====
Year	Archer	Rank	Category
2017	Clément Thomas	(silver) 2	Junior Men - Compound without sight
2017	Christine Thomas	(silver) 2	Vétéran Women - Compound without sight
2018	Christine Thomas	(gold) 1	Vétéran Women - Compound without sight
2019	Christine Thomas	(silver) 2	Vétéran Women - Compound without sight

==== Championnat de France de tir 3D ====
Year	Archer	Rank	Category
2017	Clément Thomas	(gold) 1	Junior Men - Compound without sight
2017	Christine Thomas	(bronze) 3	Vétéran Women - Compound without sight
2019	Christine Thomas	(silver) 2	Senior 2 Women - Compound without sight

==== Championnat de France de tir Beursault ====
Year	Archer	Rank	Category
1955	Fernande Magnier	(bronze) 3	Dame
1959	Fernande Magnier	(gold) 1	Dame
2000	Marian Dode	(gold) 1	Benjamin Men - Recurve
2000	Céline Garçon	(gold) 1	Senior Women - Recurve
2000	Justine Cotrel	(bronze) 3	Cadette Women - Recurve
2001	Marian Dode	(gold) 1	Benjamin Men - Recurve
2001	Céline Garçon	(bronze) 3	Senior Women - Recurve
2002	Céline Garçon	(gold) 1	Senior Women - Recurve
2003	Sylvain Vicogne	(silver) 2	Senior Men - Recurve
2004	Christian Trefcon	(bronze) 3	Vétéran Men - Recurve
2005	Sylvain Vicogne	(silver) 2	Senior Men - Recurve
2016	Philippe Thebault	(bronze) 3	Super Vétéran Men - Recurve
2017	Anais Leneutre-Bourhis	(bronze) 3	Senior Women - Recurve

==== Championnat de France de tir sur cible en plein air ====
Year	Archer	Rank	Category
1955	Fernande Magnier	(bronze) 3	Dame

==== Championnat de France universitaire ====
Year	Archer(s)	Rank	Category	University
2020	Florent Wiart; Sébastien Tétu	(bronze) 3	Team - Recurve	UPJV

=== International ===
==== World Firefighters Games ====
Year	Archer	Rank	Category
2000	Sylvain Vicogne	(gold) 1	Senior Men - Recurve
2002	Sylvain Vicogne	(gold) 1	Senior Men - Recurve
2004	Sylvain Vicogne	(gold) 1	Senior Men - Recurve
2008	Sylvain Vicogne	(bronze) 3	Senior Men - Recurve

==== World Police and Fire Games ====
Year	Archer	Rank	Category
2003	Sylvain Vicogne	(gold) 1	Senior Men - Recurve
2005	Sylvain Vicogne	(silver) 2	Senior Men - Recurve

==== World Field Archery Championships ====
Year	Archer	Rank	Category
1986	Pascal Colmaire	(gold) 1	Mixed team

==== European Field Archery Championships ====
Year	Archer	Rank	Category
1986	Pascal Colmaire	(gold) 1	Mixed team
