= La Chaussée-Tirancourt =

- Commune
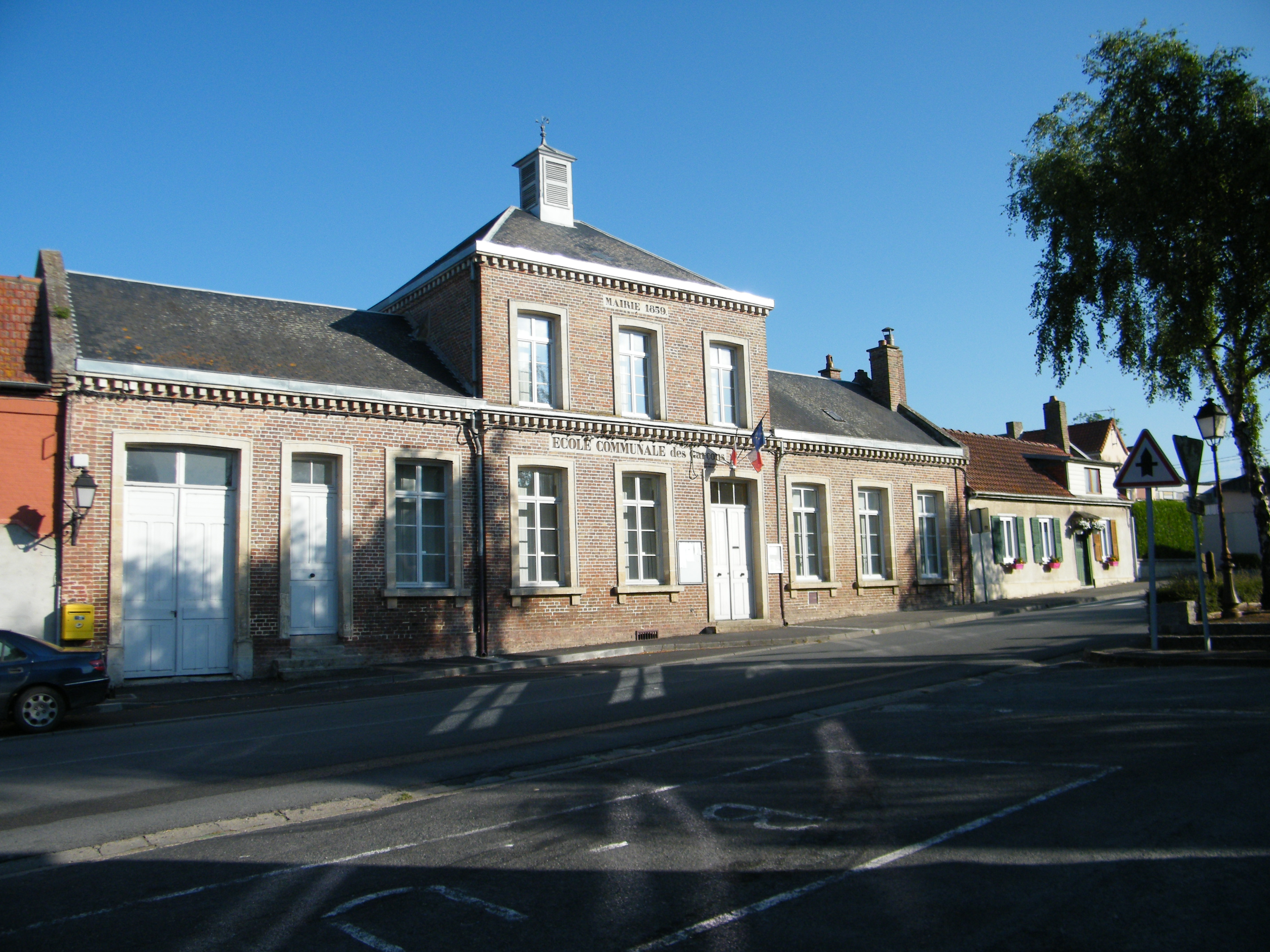
- The town hall and school in La Chaussée
- Location of La Chaussée-Tirancourt
- Location within France Location within Hauts-de-France
- Coordinates: 49°57′15″N 2°08′58″E
- Country: France
- Region: Hauts-de-France
- Department: Somme
- Arrondissement: Amiens
- Canton: Ailly-sur-Somme
- Intercommunality: CC Nièvre et Somme

Government
  - Mayor (2020–2026): Philippe Francois
- Area^{1}: 12.52 km^{2} (4.83 sq mi)
- Elevation: 17 m (56 ft)
- Highest elevation: 97 m (318 ft)
- Lowest elevation: 12 m (39 ft)
- Population (2023): 699
  - Density: 55.8/km^{2} (145/sq mi)
- Time zone: UTC+01:00 (CET)
  - Summer (DST): UTC+02:00 (CEST)
- INSEE/Postal code: 80187 /80310
- ^{1} French Land Register data, which excludes lakes, ponds, glaciers > 1 km^{2} (0.386 sq mi or 247 acres) and river estuaries.

La Chaussée-Tirancourt (French pronunciation: [la ʃose tiʁɑ̃kuʁ]; Picard: L’Cœuchie-Tinincourt) is a commune in the Somme department in Hauts-de-France in northern France.

== Geography ==
The commune is situated on the N235 road, on the banks of the river Somme some 8 miles (13 km) northwest of Amiens.

La Chaussée-Tirancourt is classified as a rural periurban commune, according to the density grid defined by Insee in 2025.

== Population ==
Historical population
Year	Pop.	±% p.a.
1968	480	—
1975	581	+2.77%
1982	645	+1.50%
1990	673	+0.53%
1999	687	+0.23%
2007	658	−0.54%
2012	650	−0.24%
2017	659	+0.28%
2023	699	+0.99%
Source: INSEE

== Points of interest ==
- Samara historical park, recreating ancient civilization and habitation based on local archaeology, from paleolithic to Gallo-Roman times, including reconstructions of homes and other buildings set within the area's marshes. Includes the Arboretum de Samara.

== See also ==
- Communes of the Somme department
- Réseau des Bains de Mer
