= Samara Arboretum =

Arboretum and botanical garden in Picardy, France

Coordinates: 49°56′47″N 2°10′43″E

The Samara Arboretum (French Arboretum de Samara) is an arboretum and botanical garden located in the Samara historical park in La Chaussée-Tirancourt, Somme, Picardy, France. It is open daily in the warmer months; an admission fee is charged.

Samara is a regional development project that recreates ancient civilization and habitation based on local archaeology, from paleolithic to Gallo-Roman times, including reconstructions of homes and other buildings set within the area's marshes. The park includes an arboretum (100 varieties of trees), small botanical garden (500 plant varieties), ethnobotanical garden representing neolithic cultivation, and nature trail.

== Gallery ==
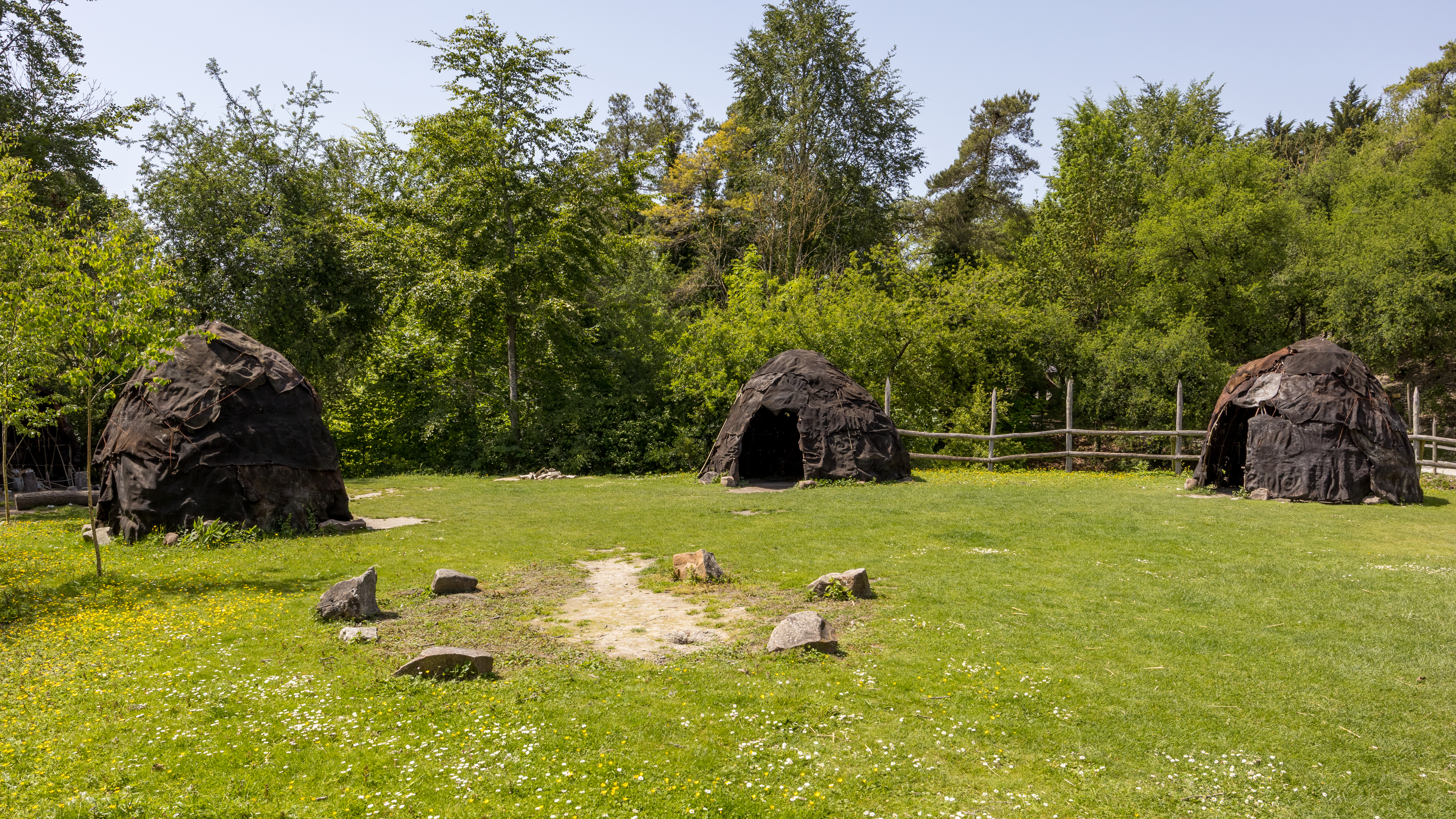
Paleolithic hut

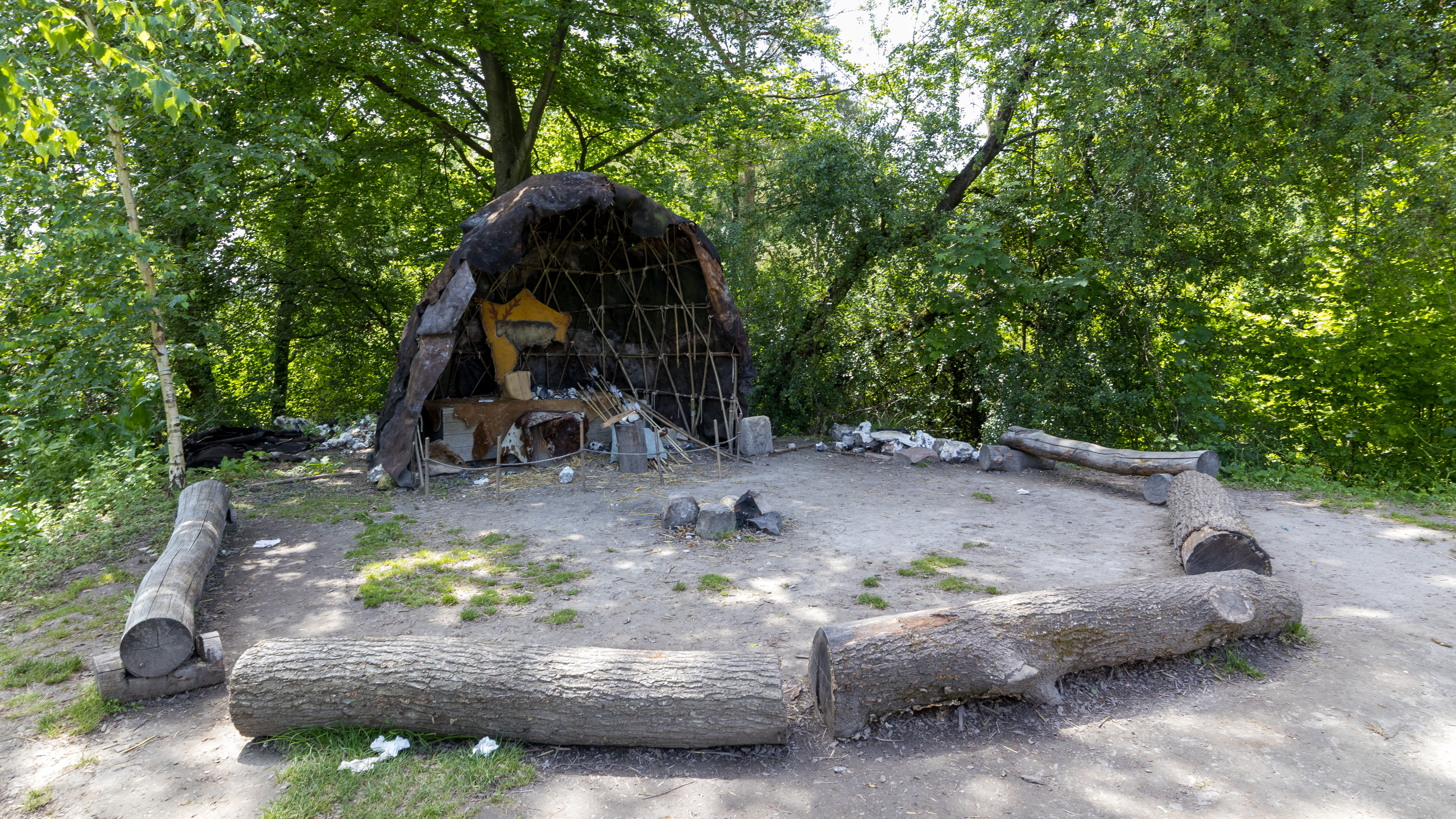

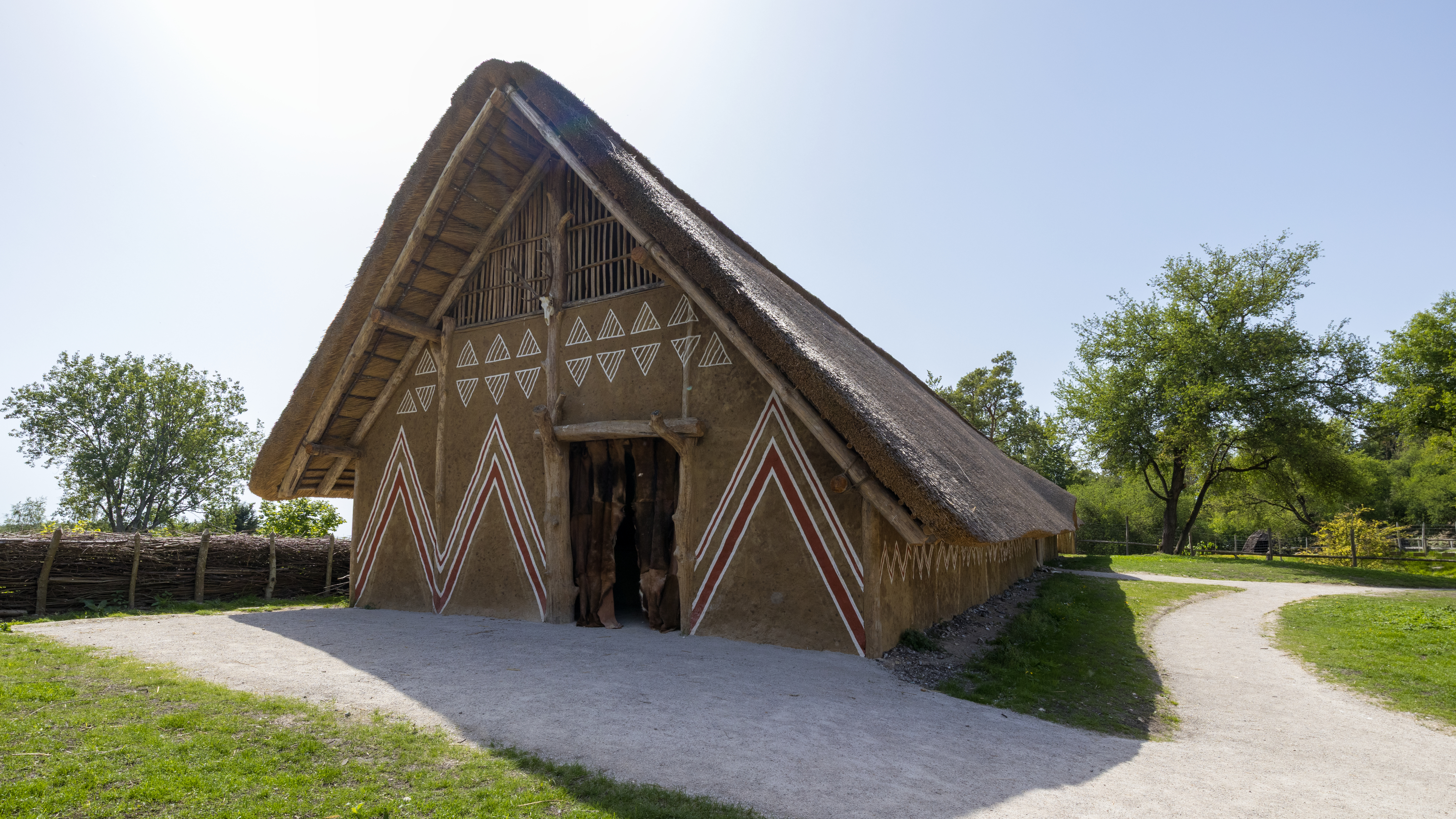
Neolithic house

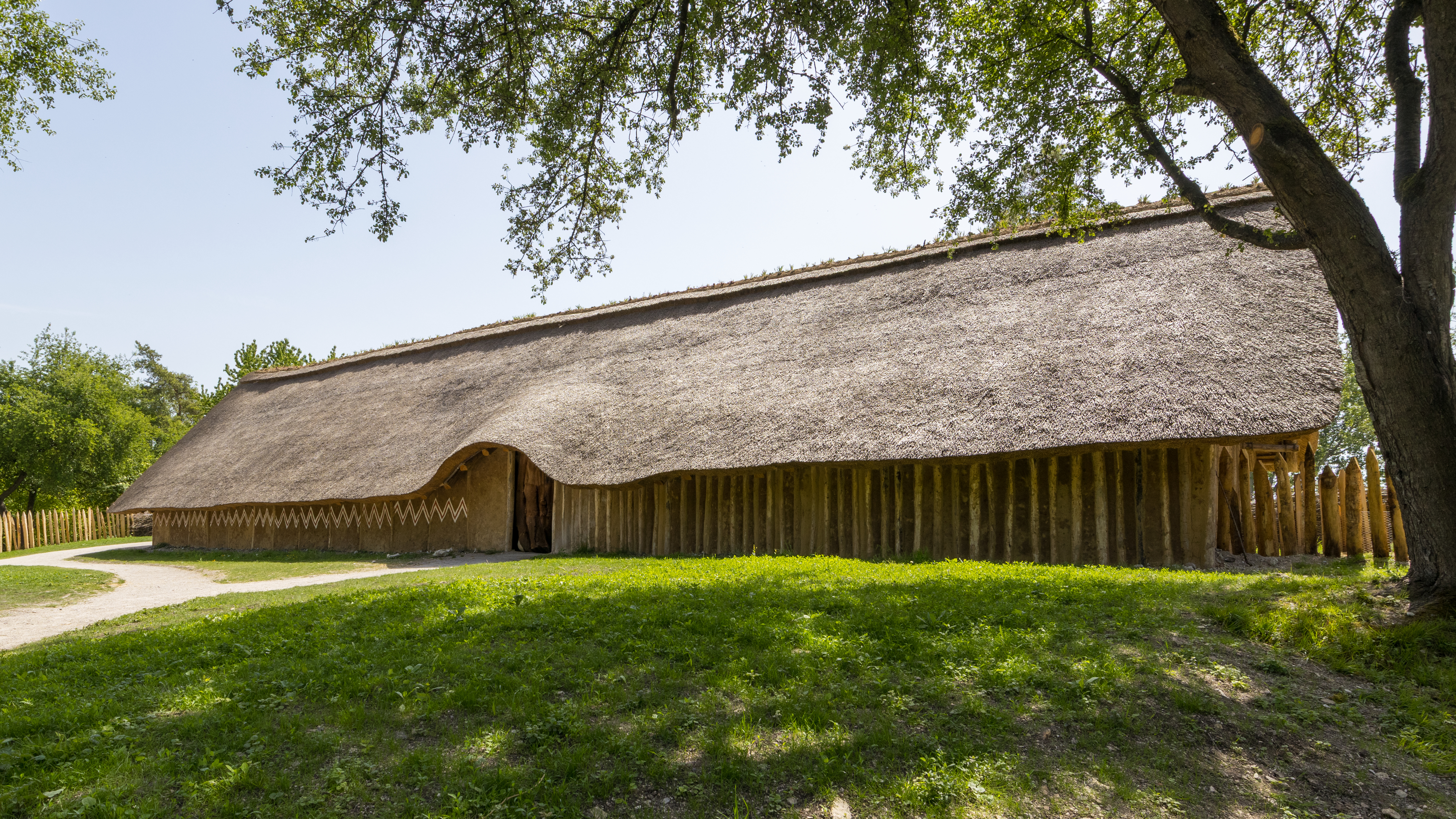

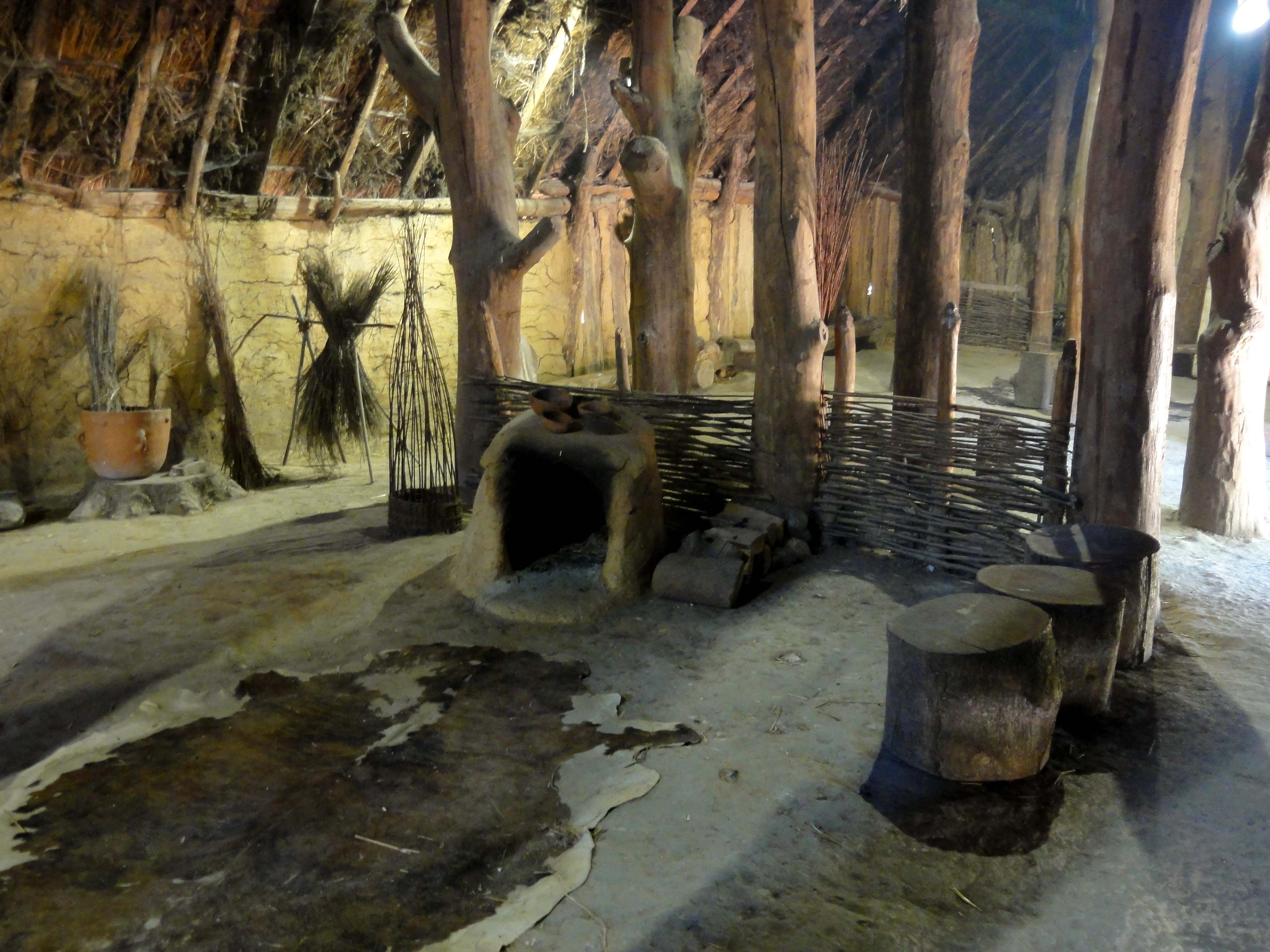
Neolithic interior

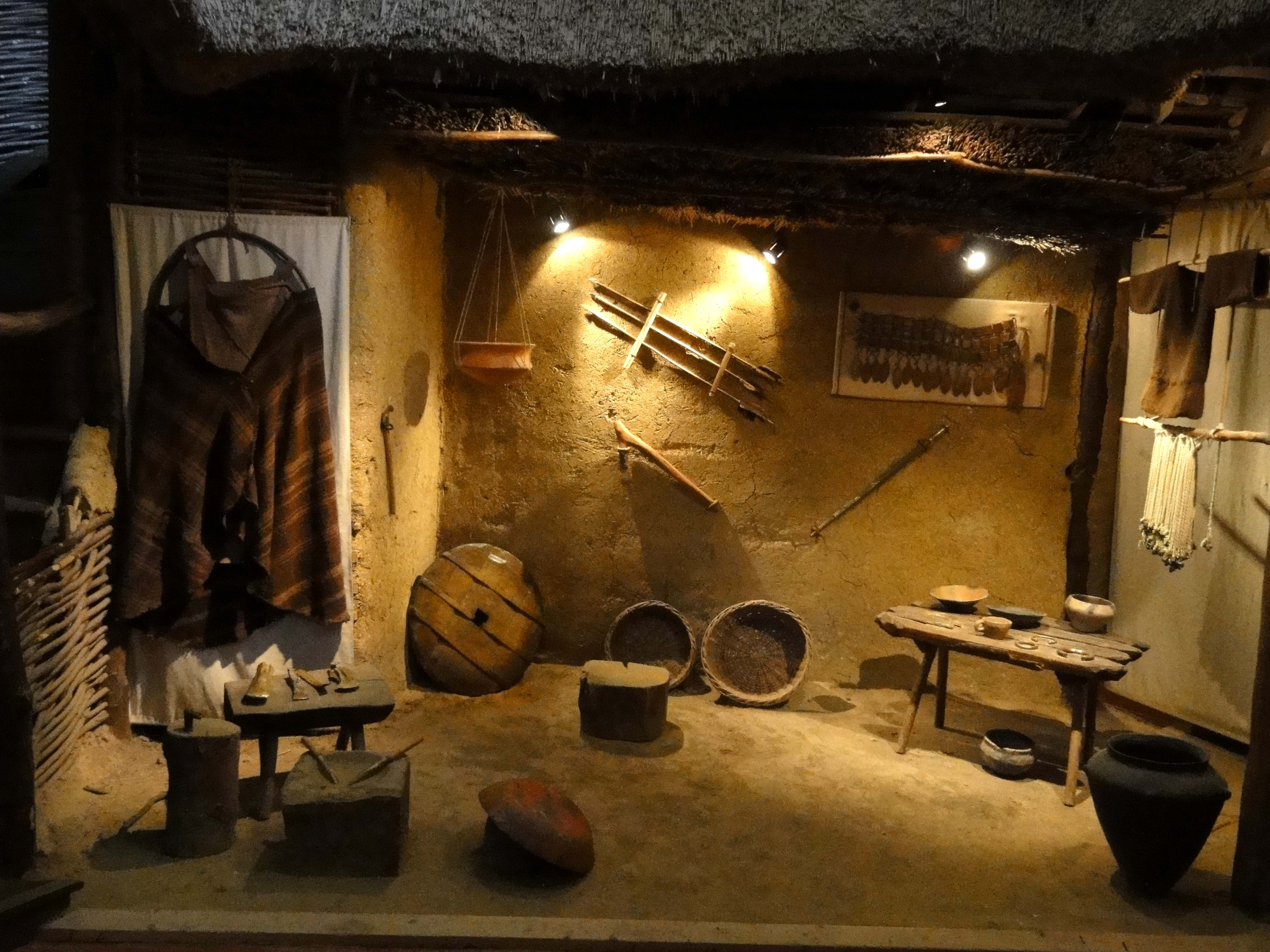
Bronze Age interior

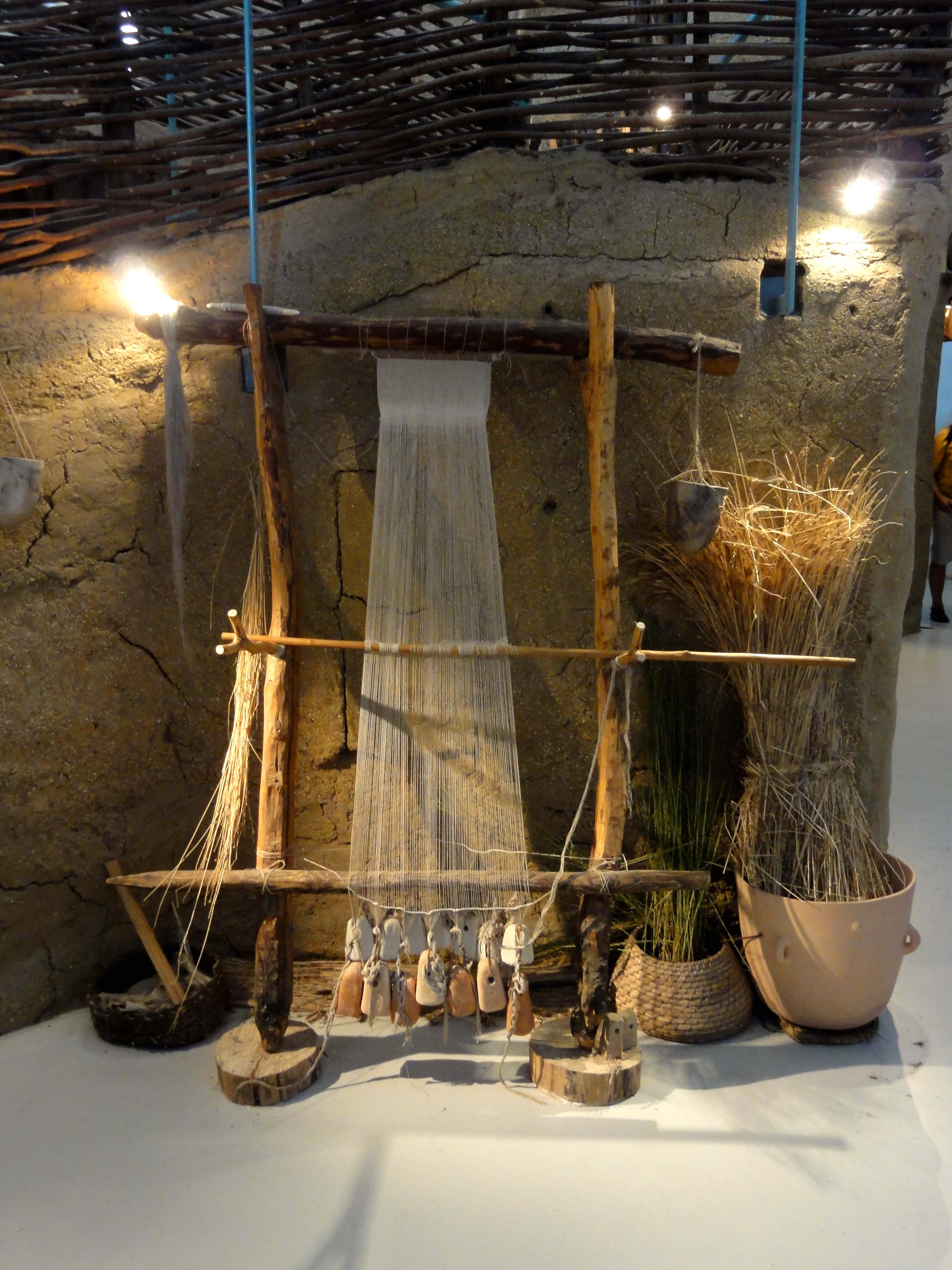
Neolithic loom

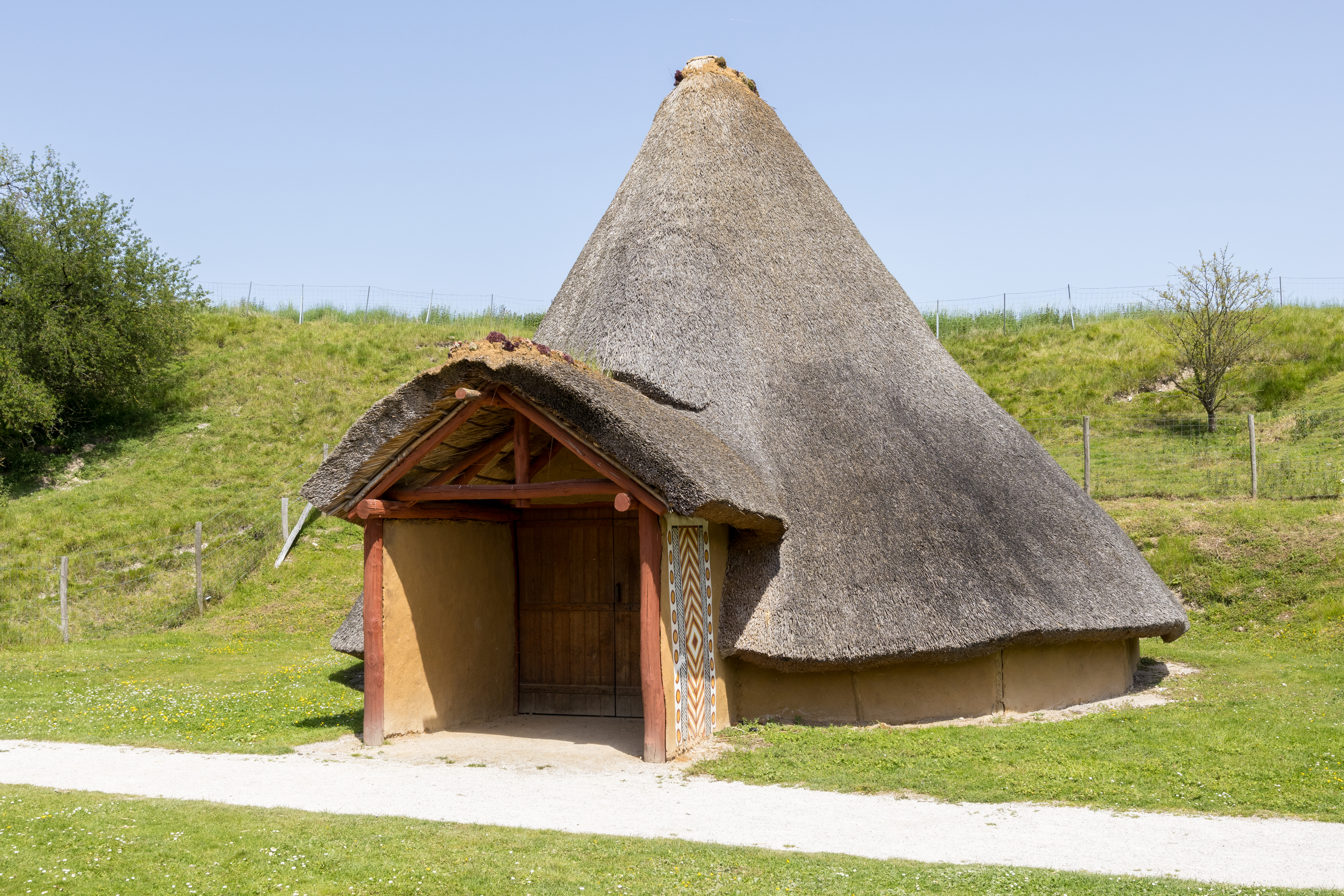
Celtic house, Iron Age

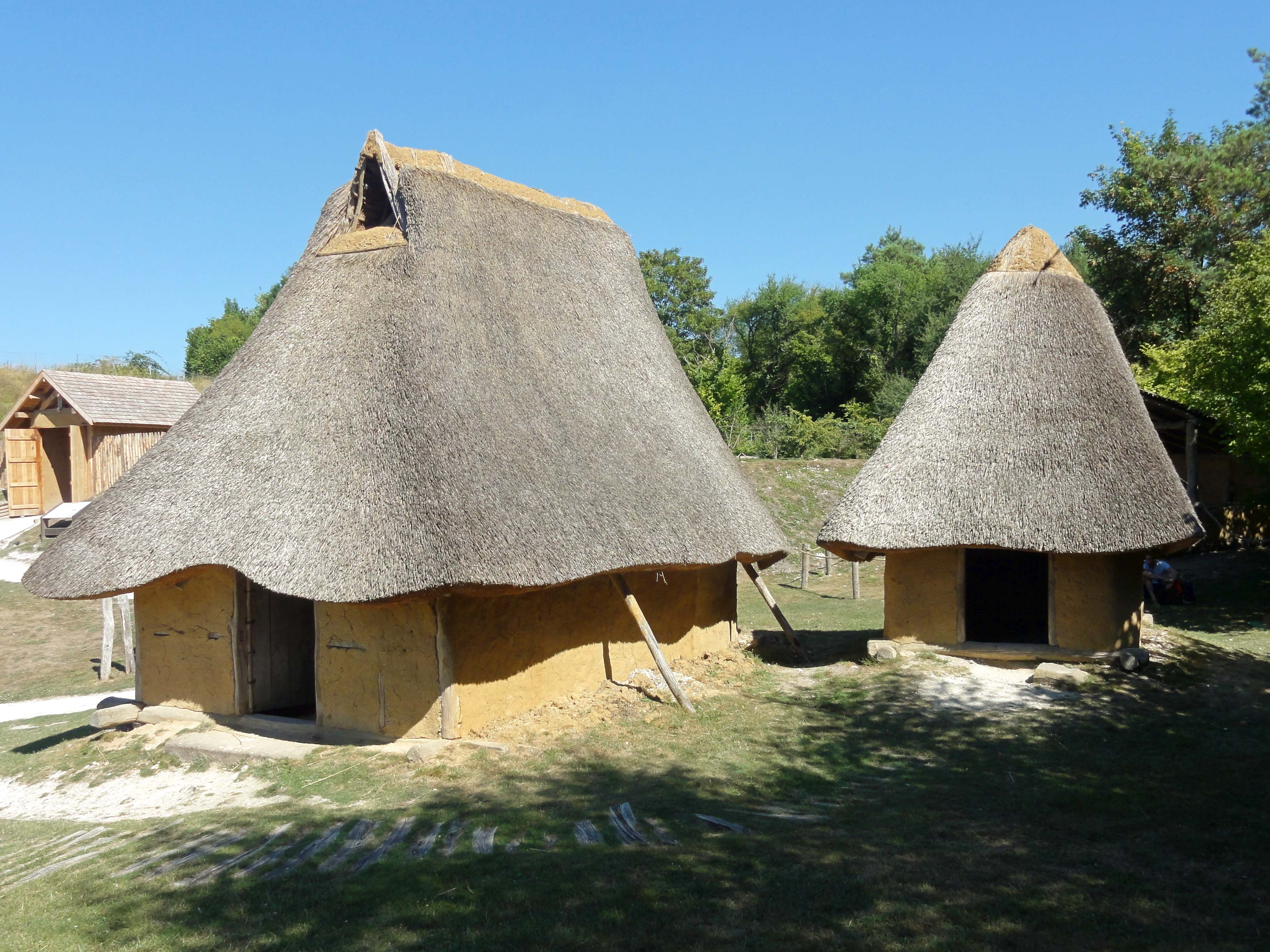
Bronze Age buildings

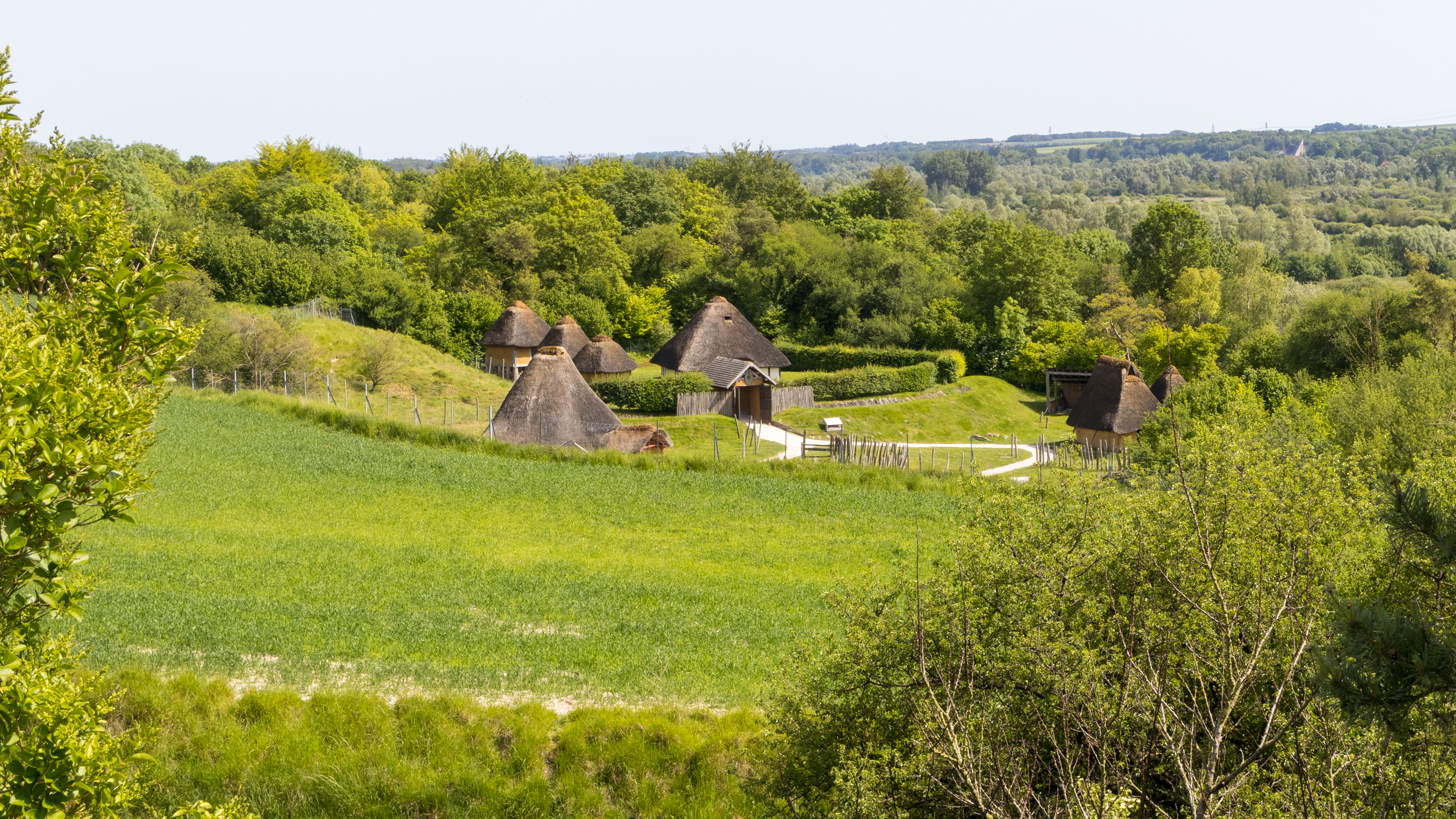
Gallic village, Iron Age

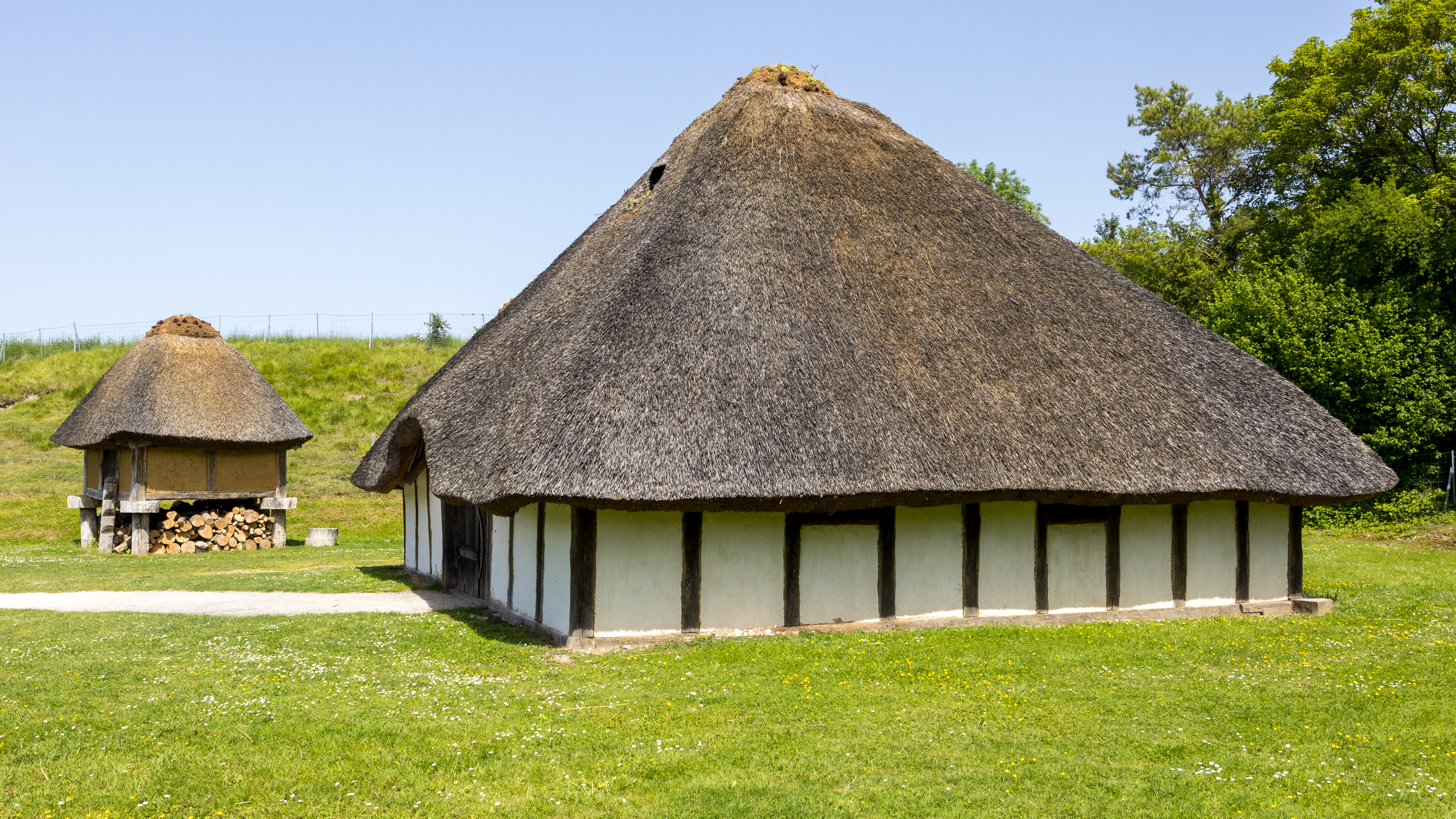
Gallic house, Iron Age

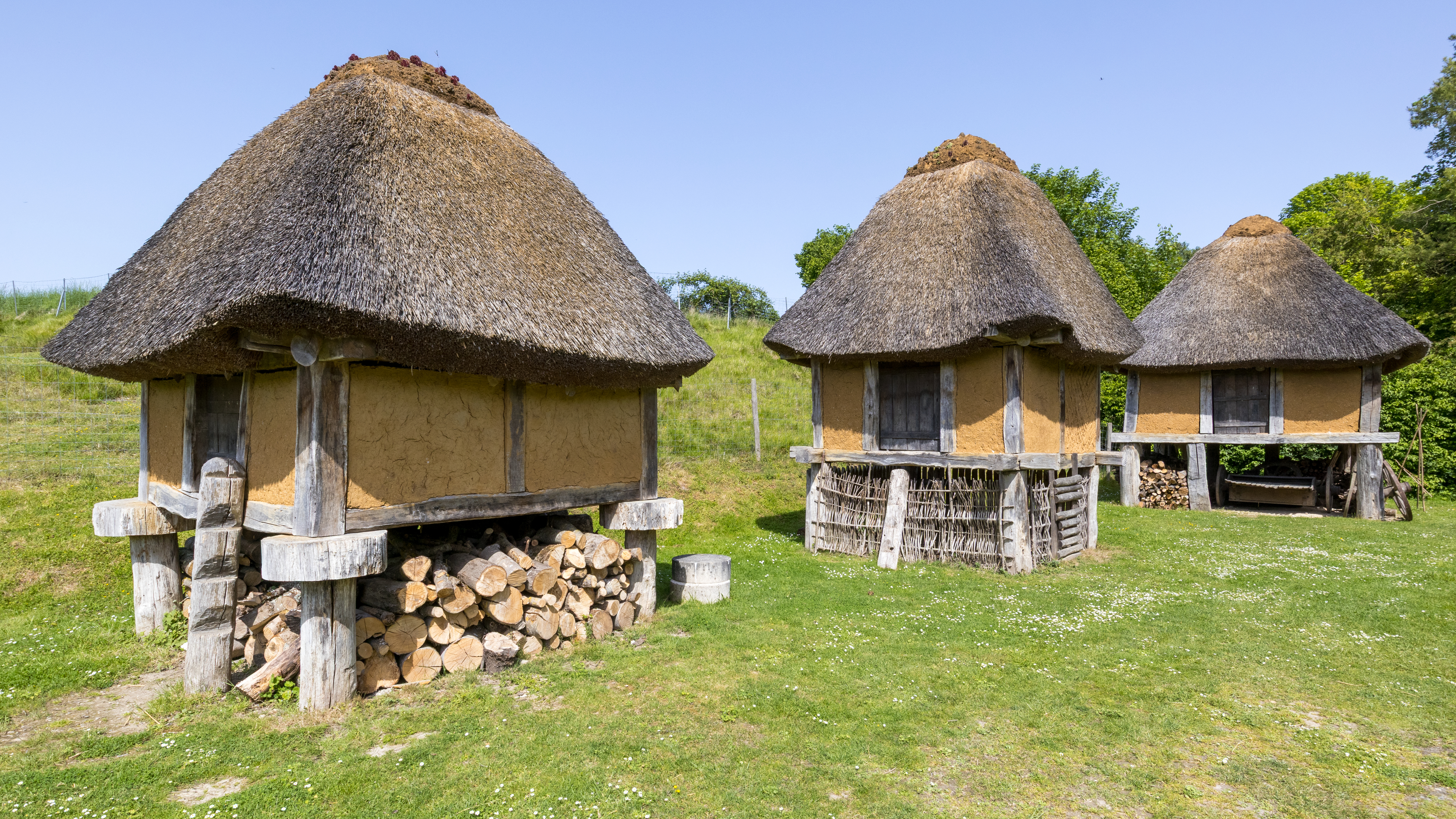
Granary of the Gallic houses

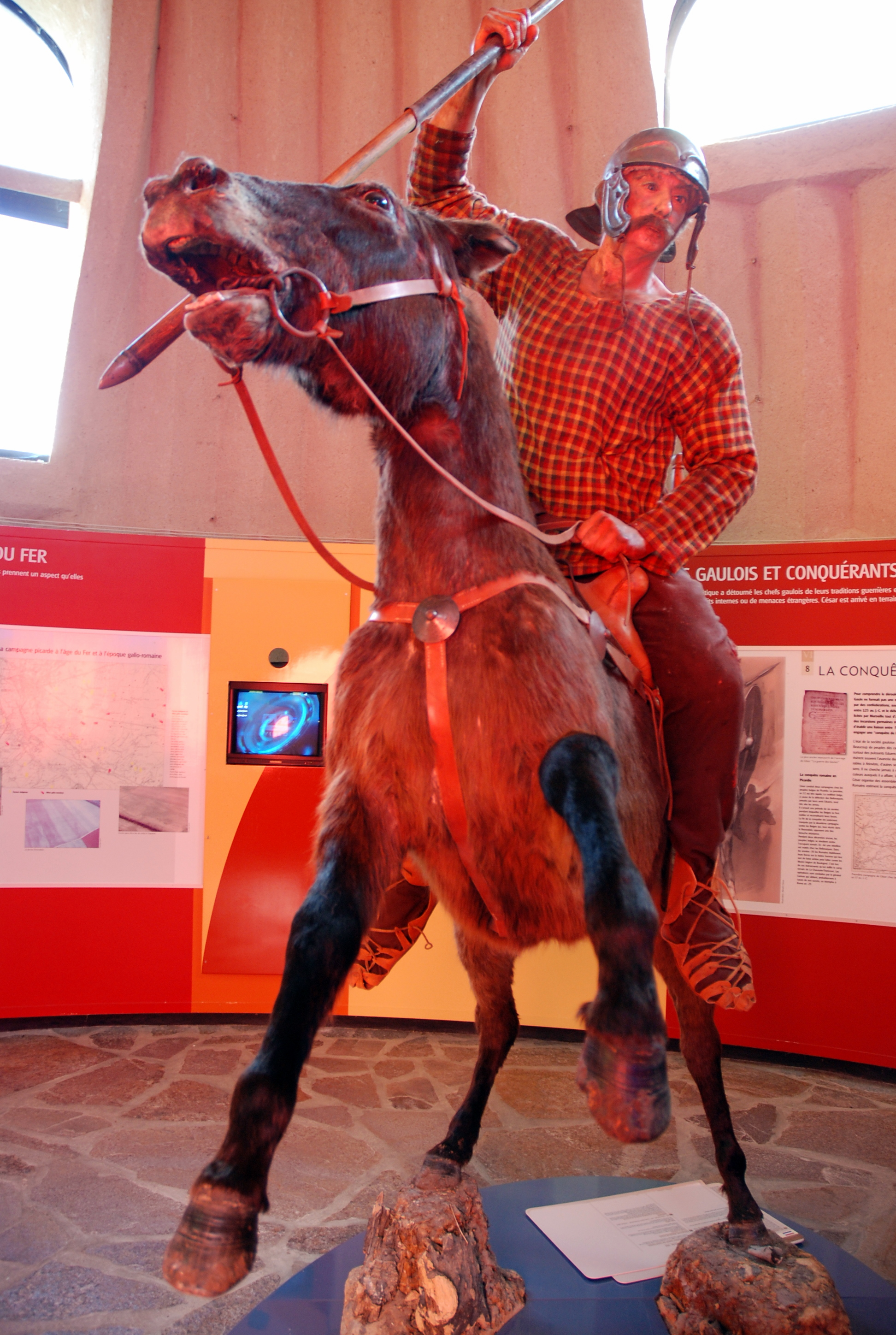
Gallic warrior

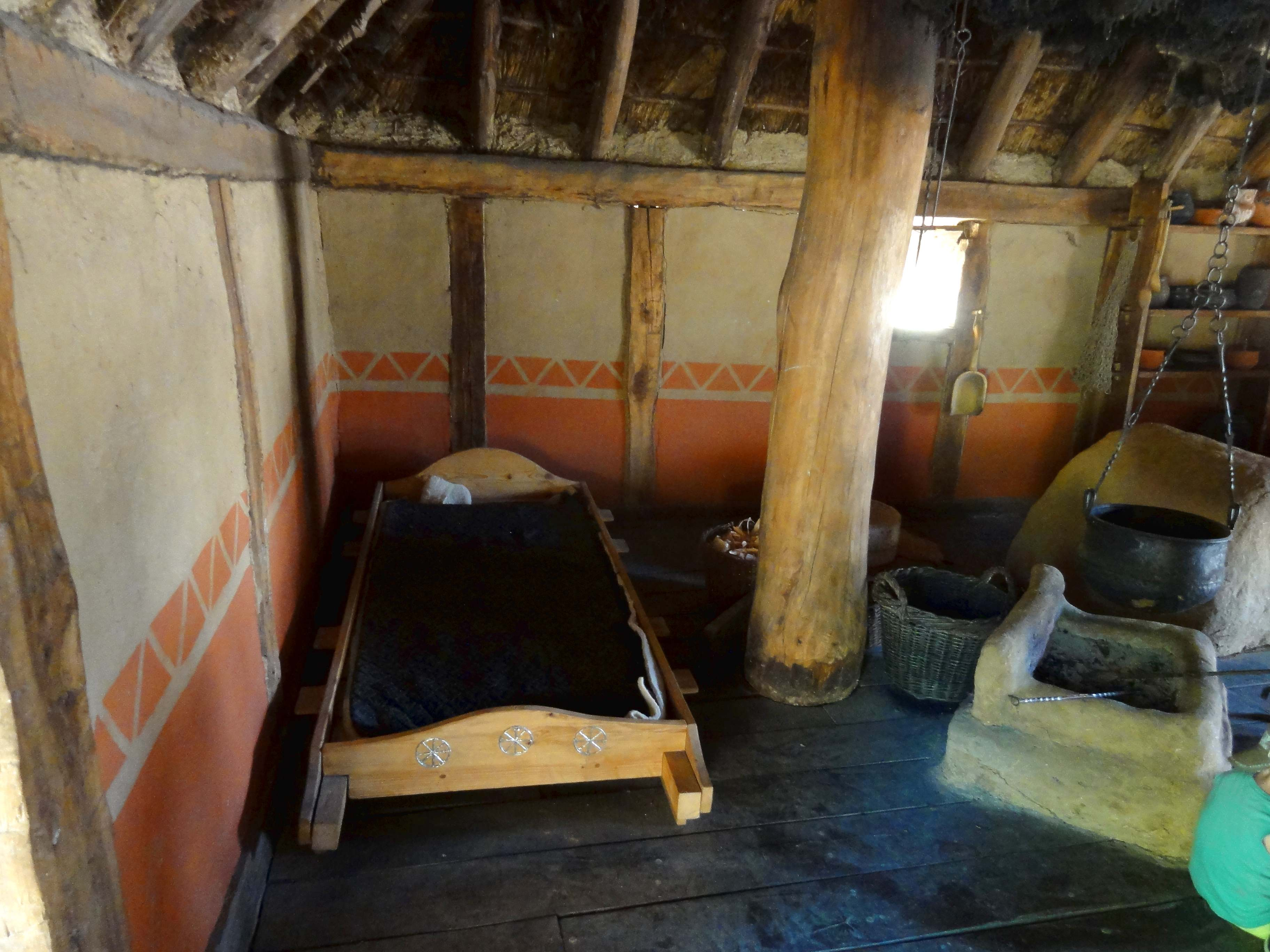
Gallic house interior

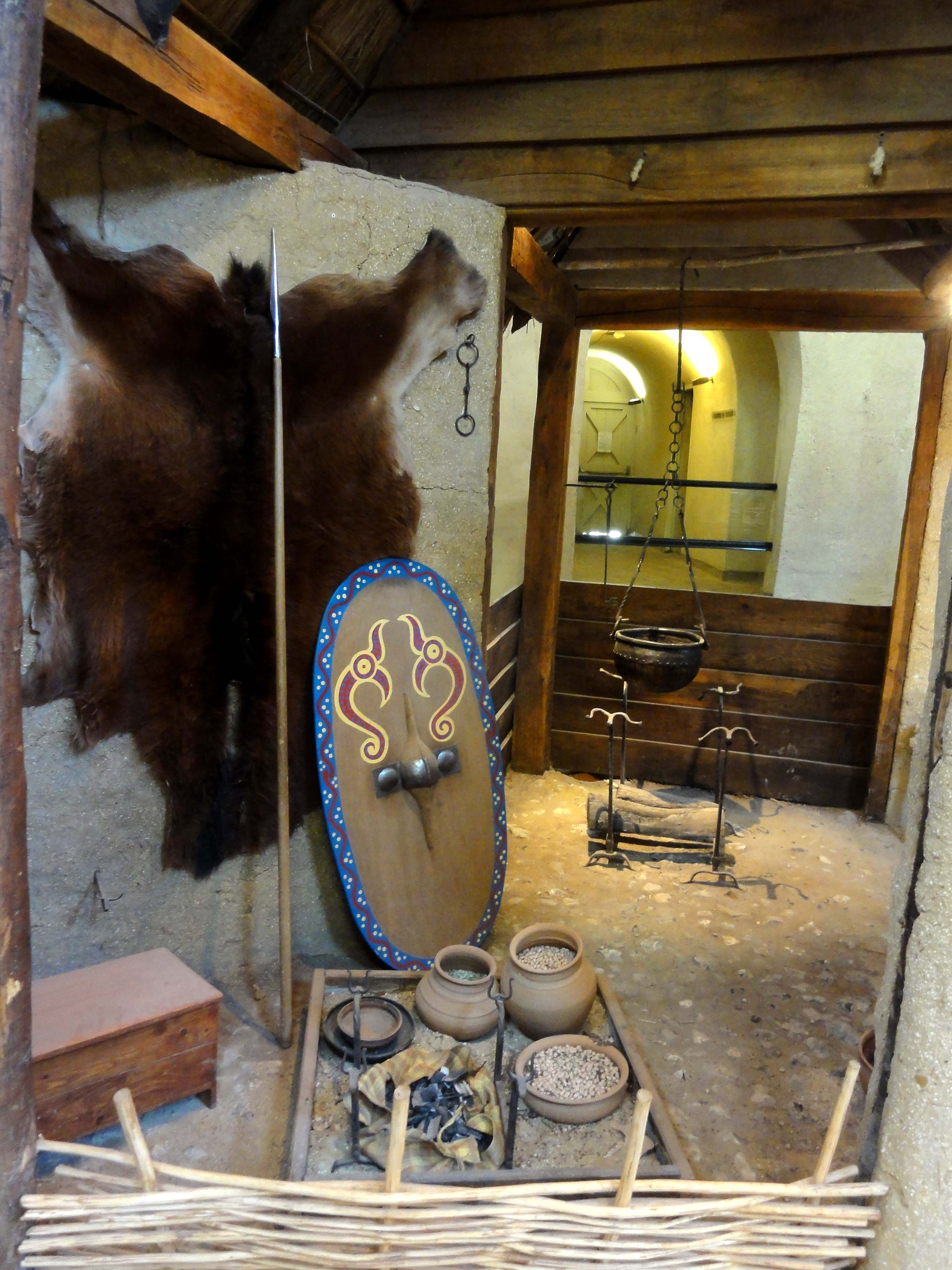
Celtic house interior, Iron Age

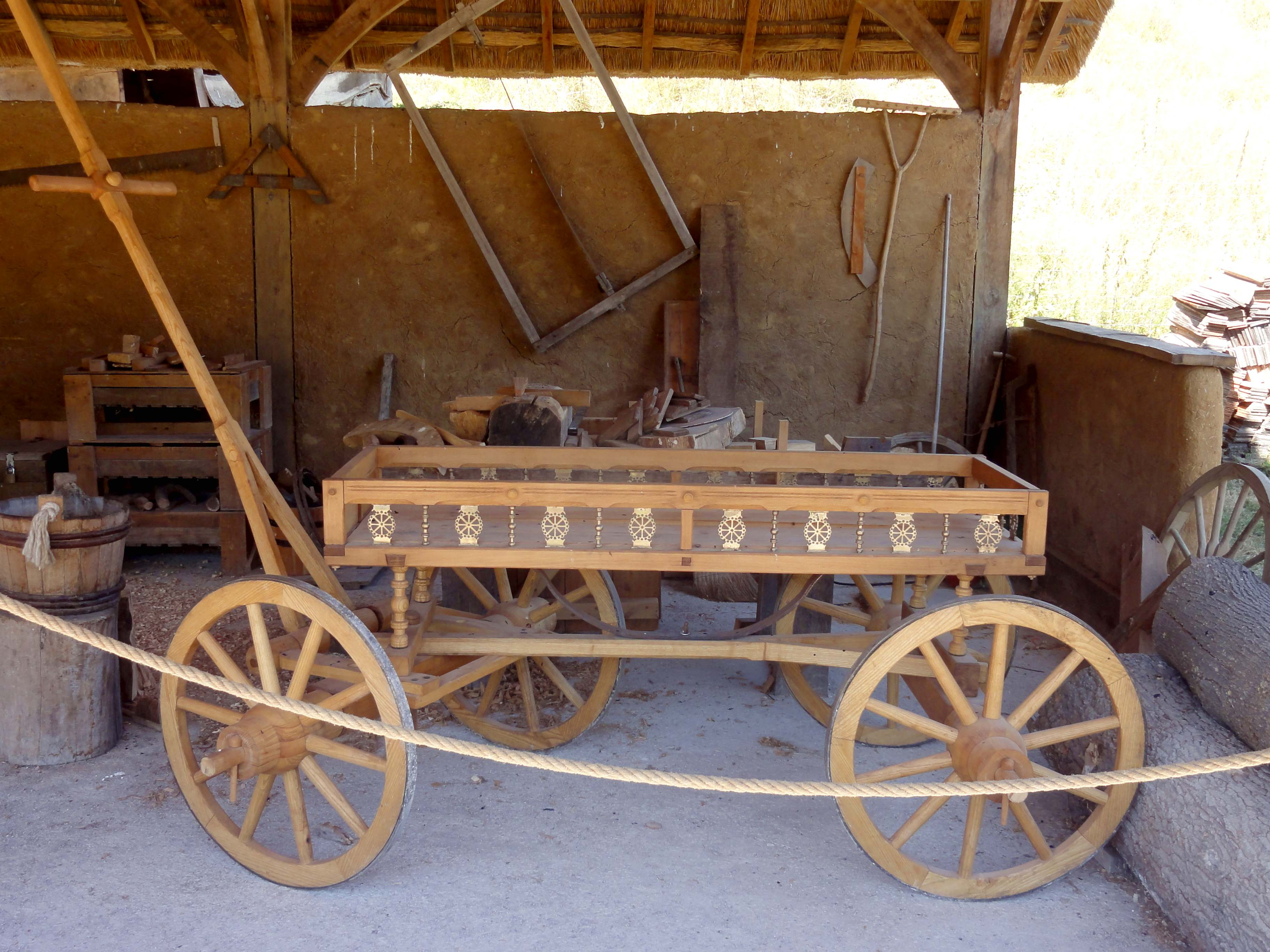
Celtic funerary wagon

== See also ==
- List of botanical gardens in France
- Hallstatt culture
- La Tène culture
- Bronze Age Europe
- Neolithic Europe
