= Éric Chaulvet =

French basketball player

Éric Chaulvet (born August 5, 1974 in Amiens) is a French basketball player who played 13 games for French Pro A league club Vichy during the 2002-2003 season.
