= Rankings of universities in France =

There is no national rankings of universities and Grandes écoles in France, but only rankings based on the Academic major, the completion and graduation rates in a bachelor's (Licence) or master's degree, or on employment after graduation. According to a parliamentary report by the French Senate, global university rankings, in particular the Academic Ranking of World Universities, are being taken into greater consideration and have been very successful over the past decade. The French government also uses the Shanghai ranking as its national ranking for French universities and Grandes écoles.

Only Le Figaro, Le Parisien and L'Étudiant, based on figures from the French government's two national higher education access platforms Parcoursup and MonMaster, rank the best bachelor's (Licence) and master's degrees according to completion rates. Le Figaro, L'Étudiant and Le Nouvel Obs also produce an annual ranking of the best Grandes écoles in business and engineering, which are only accessible on the basis of a highly selective competitive examination. Eduniversal provides rankings of undergraduate and graduate degrees of French universities in some areas.

Some of France's universities also rank highly in global university rankings, with five French universities (all in Paris) ranking in the top 100 of at least one of the three major global rankings: QS World University Rankings, Times Higher Education World University Rankings and Academic Ranking of World Universities.

== French Universities and Grandes écoles in global rankings ==
University or Grande école	Department	ARWU (2024)		QS (2025)	THE (2024)
PSL University (includes 10 Grandes écoles)	Paris	2	33	24	40
Paris-Saclay University (includes 4 Grandes écoles)	Essonne	1	12	73	58
Sorbonne University	Paris	3	41	63	75
Paris Cité University	Paris	4	60	302	152
Aix-Marseille University	Bouches-du-Rhône	5	101–150		
Grenoble Alpes University	Isère	6	101–150		
University of Strasbourg	Bas-Rhin	7	101–150		
University of Montpellier	Hérault	8	151–200		
Claude Bernard University Lyon 1	Rhône	9	201–300		
University of Bordeaux	Gironde	10	201–300		
University of Lorraine	Meurthe-et-Moselle	11	201–300		
École normale supérieure de Lyon	Rhône	12	301–400		
Polytechnic Institute of Paris (Grande école)	Essonne	13	301–400	46	71
Toulouse Capitole University	Haute-Garonne	14	301–400		
Paul Sabatier University	Haute-Garonne	15	301–400		
University of Lille	Nord	16	301–400		

== French Universities and Grandes écoles in national rankings ==
The following rankings of French universities and Grandes écoles are produced annually:

=== National rankings of universities and Grandes Écoles by academic major ===
==== Law ====
===== QS Law School ranking =====
Rank (1–5)	Law School	Department	Rank (6–10)	Law School	Department
1	Sorbonne Law School, Panthéon-Sorbonne University	Paris	6	J. Monnet Faculty of Law, Paris-Saclay University	Val-de-Marne
2	Sciences Po Law School, Sciences Po	Paris	7	University of Strasbourg Faculty of Law	Bas-Rhin
3	Assas Law School, Panthéon-Assas University	Paris	8	Paris Nanterre University Faculty of Law	Hauts-de-Seine
4	Aix-Marseille University Faculty of Law	Bouches-du-Rhône	9	Toulouse Capitole University Faculty of Law	Haute-Garonne
5	Dauphine, PSL University	Paris	10	University of Rennes Faculty of Law	Ille-et-Vilaine

===== Le Figaro Law School ranking =====
Le Figaro's ranking uses eight different criteria, including selectivity on the Parcoursup national platform, the proportion of stable jobs, the median net monthly salary after a master's degree in law, and the number of university PhDs admitted to the agrégation competitive examination in law.

Rank (1–10)	Law School	Rank (11–20)	Law School
1	Assas Law School, Panthéon-Assas University	11	Faculty of Law, Toulouse Capitole University
2	Sorbonne Law School, Panthéon-Sorbonne University	12	Faculty of Law, Côte d'Azur University
3	Faculty of Law, Jean Moulin University (Lyon III)	13	Faculty of Law, University of Lille
4	Malakoff Faculty of Law, Paris Cité University	14	Faculty of Law, CY Cergy Paris University
5	Faculty of Law, Aix-Marseille University	15	Montesquieu College of Law, University of Bordeaux
6	Faculty of Law, Paris Nanterre University	16	Faculty of Law, University of Montpellier
7	J. Monnet Faculty of Law, Paris-Saclay University	17	Law School, Paris-East Créteil University
8	Faculty of Law, University of Strasbourg	18	Faculty of Law, University of Angers
9	Faculty of Law, Lumière University (Lyon III)	19	Faculty of Law, University of Burgundy
10	Faculty of Law, University of Rennes	20	Nancy Faculty of Law, University of Lorraine

==== Management ====
Grande école	Le Figaro (2024)	L'Étudiant (2024)
HEC Paris	1	1
ESSEC Business School	2	3
ESCP Business School	3	2
EDHEC Business School	4	4
EMLyon Business School	5	5
Skema Business School	6	6
IÉSEG School of Management	N/A	7
Neoma Business School	7	8
Kedge Business School	8	11
Audencia Business School	9	8
Grenoble School of Management	10	14

==== Engineering ====
* Precision for "Le Figaro" rankings : two different rankings are available depending on whether having been to a prepa is required or not. Schools which require it are often considered more prestigious. Therefore the post-prepa ranking is considered the main one.

Grande école	Daur (2023)	Le Figaro (2024) and	L'Étudiant (2024)	L'Usine Nouvelle (2024)
Ecole polytechnique	1	1	1	1
Mines Paris - PSL	2	2	3	2
ESPCI Paris - PSL	3	10	30	11
CentraleSupélec	4	3	6	3
Ecole des Ponts ParisTech	5	4	11	Not included
ENSTA	6	6	2	Not included
ENSAE	7	9	12	36
Télécom Paris	8	5	7	Not included
Supaéro	9	8	16	13
Centrale Lyon	10	7	9	12
Centrale Nantes	19	11	4	Not included
IMT Atlantique	14	14	5	17
Mines Nancy	12	14	8	5
mines St-Etienne	21	14	10	Not included
ESILV	43	3*	20	4
ECE	91	9*	47	7
EEIGM	70	42*	56	8
EFREI	98	8*	33	9
ESIEA	79	19*	36	10

==== Politics ====
===== Challenges Institutes of political sciences ranking =====
Rankings of the institutes of political sciences according to Challenges.

Rank	Grande école
1	Sciences Po (Paris)
2	Lyon Institute of Political Studies
3	Sciences Po Lille, University of Lille
4	Sciences Po Strasbourg, University of Strasbourg
5	Bordeaux Institute of Political Studies, University of Bordeaux
6	Sciences Po Aix, Aix-Marseille University
7	Sciences Po Toulouse
8	Rennes Institute of Political Studies, University of Rennes
9	Grenoble Institute of Political Studies, Grenoble Alpes University
10	Sciences Po Saint-Germain-en-Laye

=== National undergraduate university rankings by completion rate ===
University	L'Étudiant (2024)	Le Parisien (2024)
University of Upper Alsace	1	1
University of Angers	2	3
Panthéon-Sorbonne University	3	4
University of La Rochelle	4	16
Panthéon-Assas University	5	2
University of Poitiers	6	5
University of Clermont	7	15
Lumière University (Lyon II)	8	13
University of Savoy	9	N/A
Champollion University (Albi)	10	12
Paris Nanterre University	11	18
University of Rennes II	12	19
University of Pau	13	N/A
Paris-Saclay University	14	7
Southern Brittany University	15	10
Jean Moulin University (Lyon III)	16	11
University of Corsica	17	8
University of Western Brittany	18	17
University of Franche-Comté	19	N/A
Jean Monnet University	20	N/A

=== National university graduate rankings by completion rate ===
University	L'Étudiant (2024)
University of Versailles	1
University of La Rochelle	2
University of Toulon	3
University of Bordeaux	4
University of Montpellier	5
University of Corsica	6
Jean Monnet University	7
Côte d'Azur University	8
University of Angers	9
Jean Moulin University (Lyon III)	10
University of Savoy	11
University of Reims	12
Eiffel University	13
University of Caen Normandy	14
University of Perpignan	15
University of Burgundy	16
University of Rennes	17
Paul Sabatier University (Toulouse III)	18
Champollion University (Albi)	19
University of Pau	20
