= Education in France =

Ministry of National Education
- Minister: Édouard Geffray

General details
- Primary languages: French
- System type: Central

Literacy (2003)
- Total: 99^{1}
- Male: 99
- Female: 99

Enrollment
- Total: 15.0 million^{2}
- Primary: 7 million
- Secondary: 6 million
- Post secondary: 2.3 million^{3}

Attainment
- Secondary diploma: 79.7%
- Post-secondary diploma: 27%
- ^{1} As of 2020, literacy rates are no longer collected within INSEE censuses.^{2} Includes private education.^{3} Includes universities, CPGE, and schools.

School system in France

Education in France is organized in a highly centralized manner, with many subdivisions. It is divided into the three stages of primary education (enseignement primaire), secondary education (enseignement secondaire), and higher education (enseignement supérieur). Two year olds do not start primary school, they start preschool. Then, by the age of six, a child in France starts primary school and advances through the year-groups until they graduate.

In French higher education, the following degrees are recognized by the Bologna Process (EU recognition): Licence and Licence Professionnelle (bachelor's degrees), and the comparably named Master and Doctorat degrees.

The Programme for International Student Assessment coordinated by the OECD in 2018 ranked the overall knowledge and skills of French 15-year-olds as 26th in the world in reading literacy, mathematics, and science, below the OECD average of 493. The average OECD performance of French 15-year-olds in science and mathematics has declined, with the share of low performers in reading, mathematics and science developing a sharp upward trend. France's share of top performers in mathematics and science has also declined.

France's performance in mathematics and science at the middle school level was ranked 23 in the 1995 Trends in International Math and Science Study. In 2019, France ranked 21 in the TIMSS Science general ranking.

== History ==
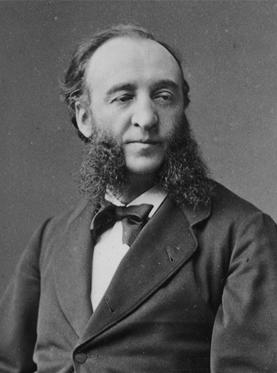
Jules Ferry

Napoleon began the French university and secondary educational systems. Guizot started the elementary system. Intense battles took place over whether the Catholic Church should play a dominant role. The modern era of French education begins at the end of the 19th century. Jules Ferry, the Minister of Public Instruction in 1881, is widely credited for creating the modern school (l'école républicaine) by requiring all children between the ages of 6 and 12, both boys and girls, to attend. He also made public instruction mandatory, free of charge, and secular (laïque). With those laws, known as French Lubbers, Jules Ferry laws, and several others, the Third Republic repealed most of the Falloux Laws of 1850–1851, which gave an important role to the clergy.

The French curriculum predominantly emphasized the works of French writers of European descent. Ferry and others considered literature the glue of French identity. The ethnic and cultural demographics of the student body did not factor in to the quest to transmit a "common culture" to the students.

Like literature, history education is recognised as critical to shaping the identity of young people and the integration of immigrants to French identity. Ferry's views continue to exert influence today. Ministry reports have confirmed that the rule of schools in promoting "common culture" is only made more critical by the rising levels of student diversity. According to the ministry, history education in France has, over the course of one century made possible "the integration of children of Italians, Poles, Africans and Portuguese".

== Governance ==
All educational programmes in France are regulated by the Ministry of National Education and Youth (officially called Ministère de l'Éducation nationale et de la Jeunesse). The head of the ministry is the Minister of National Education.

All teachers in public primary and secondary schools are state civil servants, making the ministère the largest employer in the country. Professors and researchers in France's universities are also employed by the state.

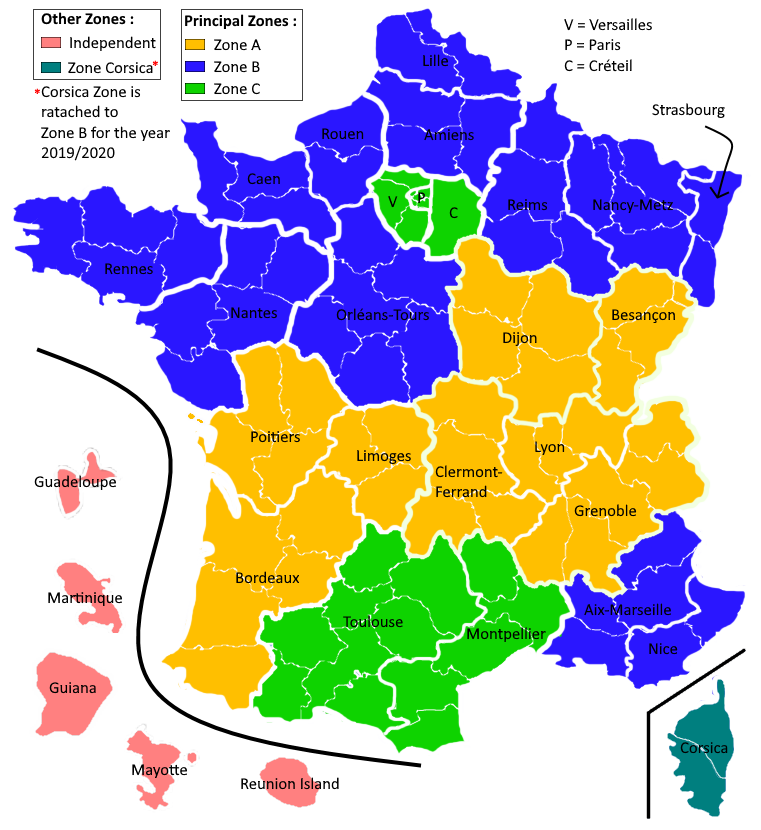
The different Académies and school zones in France

| Zone | Académies/Cites |
|---|---|
| A | Besançon, Bordeaux, Clermont-Ferrand, Dijon, Grenoble, Limoges, Lyon, Poitiers |
| B | Aix-Marseille, Amiens, Caen, Lille, Nancy-Metz, Nantes, Nice, Orléans-Tours, Reims, Rennes, Rouen, Strasbourg |
| C | Créteil, Montpellier, Paris, Toulouse, Versailles |

At the primary and secondary levels, the curriculum is the same for all French students in any given year of education, which includes public, semi-public and subsidised institutions. However, there exist specialised sections and a variety of options that students can choose. The reference for all French educators is the Bulletin officiel de l'éducation nationale, de l'enseignement supérieur et de la recherche (B.O.), which lists all current programmes and teaching directives. It is amended multiple times each year.

Since 2021, schooling is mandatory and families may only provide teaching outside of a school in exceptional circumstances:

- Long-term illness,
- Intensive athletic or artistic activities,
- Distance from a public school,
- Or other specific reasons.

== School year ==
In Metropolitan France, the school year runs from early September to early July. The school calendar is standardized throughout the country and is the sole domain of the ministry.

In May, schools need time to organize exams (for example, the baccalauréat). Outside Metropolitan France, the school calendar is set by the local recteur.

Major holiday breaks are as follows:

- All Saints (la Toussaint), two weeks (since 2012) around the end of October and the beginning of November;
- Christmas (Noël), two weeks around Christmas Day and New Year's Day;
- winter (hiver), two weeks starting in mid-February;
- spring (printemps) or Easter (Pâques), two weeks starting in mid-April;
- summer (été), two months starting in early July. (mid-June for high school students).

== Primary school ==
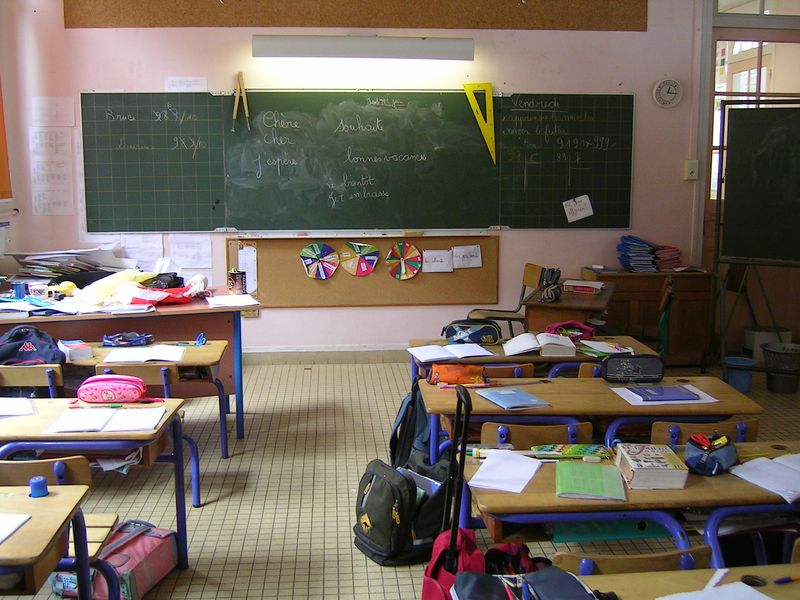
Classroom in an elementary school (école élémentaire)

Most parents start sending their children to preschool (école maternelle) when they turn three. Some even start earlier at age two in pre-nursery (toute petite section; "TPS"). The first two years of preschool (TPS, and nursery—petite section, "PS") are introductions to community living. Children learn how to become students and are introduced to their first notions of arithmetic, begin to recognize letters, develop oral language, etc. The last two years of preschool, nursery 2 (moyenne section) and kindergarten (grande section) are more school-like; pupils are introduced to reading, writing and more mathematics.

A preschool can be stand-alone (mostly true in towns and cities) or affiliated with an elementary school (mostly in villages). As in other educational systems, primary school students in France usually have a single teacher (or two) who teaches the entire curriculum, without specialist teachers.

After kindergarten, the young students move on to the elementary school. In the first three years of elementary school, they learn to write, develop their reading skills and get some basics in subjects such as French, mathematics, science and the arts. The French word for a teacher at the primary school level is professeur des écoles (fem. professeure); previously called instituteur (fem. institutrice).

Children stay in elementary school for five years until they are ten to eleven years old. The years of education are named: CP (cours préparatoire), CE1 (cours élémentaire 1), CE2 (cours élémentaire 2), CM1 (cours moyen 1) and CM2 (cours moyen 2).

== Middle school and high school ==
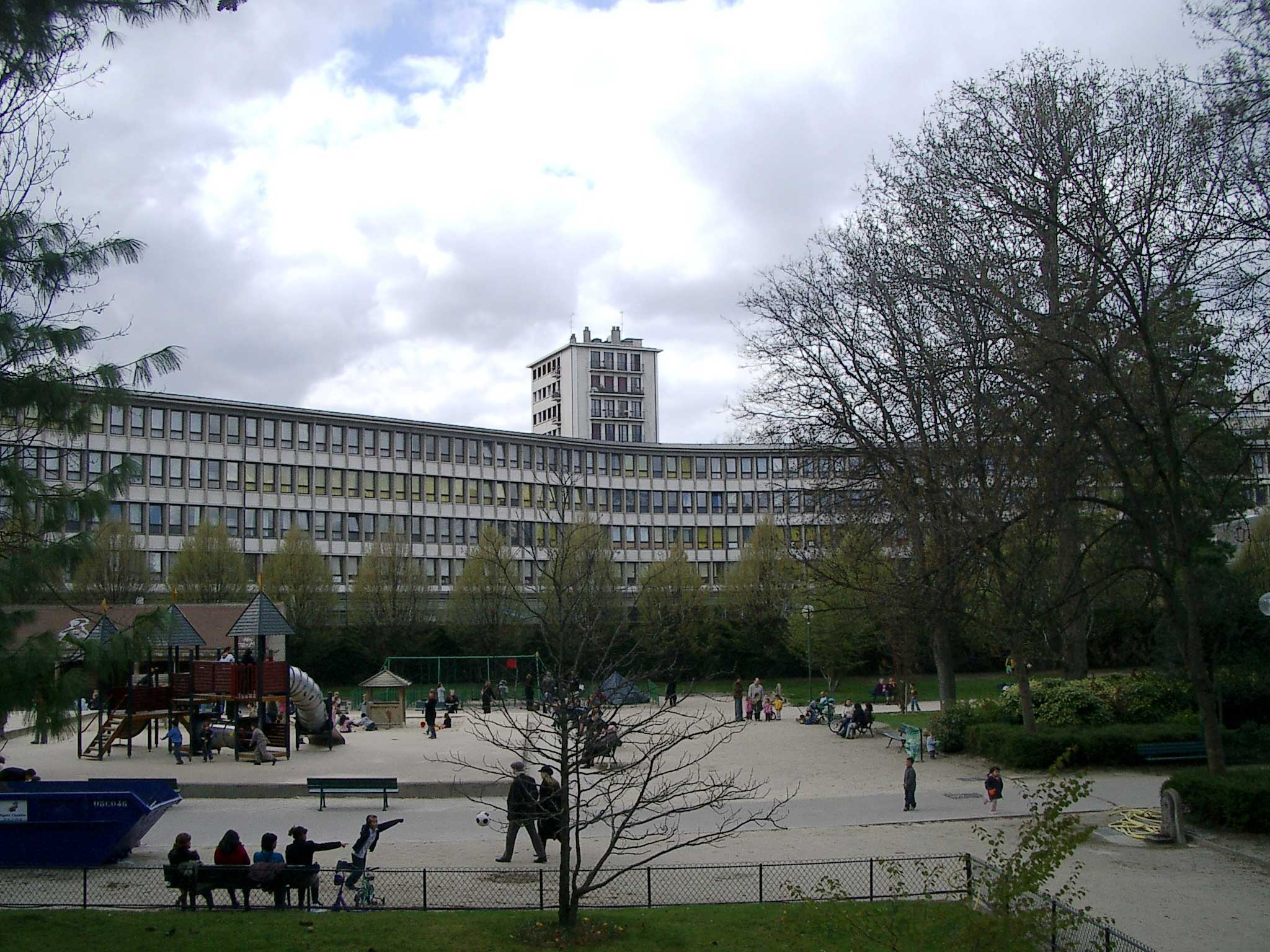
The Lycée Rodin high school in Paris

The compulsory middle and high school subjects cover French language and literature, history and geography, foreign languages, arts and crafts, musical education, civics, mathematics, physics, chemistry, natural sciences, technology, and PE. The curriculum is set by the Ministry of National Education and applies to most collèges in France and also to AEFE-dependent institutions. Académies and individual schools have little freedom in the State curriculum.

Class sizes vary from school to school, but usually range from 20 to 35 pupils.

After primary school, two educational stages follow:

- collège (middle school), for children during their first four years of secondary education from the age of 11 to 15.
- lycée (high school), which provides a three-year course of further secondary education for children between the ages of 15 and 18. Pupils are prepared for the baccalauréat (baccalaureate, colloquially known as le bac) or the CAP (Certificat d'aptitude professionnelle). The baccalauréat can lead to higher education studies or directly to professional life (there are three main types of baccalauréat: the baccalauréat général, the baccalauréat technologique, and the baccalauréat professionnel).
- CFA (centre de formation des apprentis, apprentice learning center), which provides vocational degrees: le Certificat d'aptitude professionnelle.

== Private schools ==
Primary and secondary private schools in France are divided into two categories:

- Private schools which respect the State curriculum (known as "under contract') are private, fee-paying institutions where pupils study the same national curriculum as those in public schools. Teachers in private schools are recruited in the same way and have roughly the same status as their equivalents in public schools. They are also employed directly by the State, but they are not permanently assigned and may not return to a public school position. The great majority of private schools in France are "under contract".
- Private schools without contract employ their teachers directly and may teach their own curriculum; the State, however, still monitors their educational standards. Most of these schools provide religious instruction in parallel with a broad curriculum.

== International education ==
As of January 2015, the International Schools Consultancy (ISC) listed France as having 105 international schools. ISC defines an 'international school' in the following terms: "ISC includes an international school if the school delivers a curriculum to any combination of pre-school, primary or secondary students, wholly or partly in English outside an English-speaking country, or if a school in a country where English is one of the official languages, offers an English-medium curriculum other than the country's national curriculum and is international in its orientation." That definition is used by publications including The Economist.

France has its own international school regulator, the AEFE (Agence pour l'enseignement français à l'étranger).

== Higher education ==
Higher education in France is organized in three levels, which correspond to those of other European countries, facilitating international mobility: the Licence and Licence Professionnelle (bachelor's degrees), and the Master's and Doctorat degrees. The Licence and the Master are organized in semesters: 6 for the Licence and 4 for the Master. Those levels of study include various "parcours" or paths based on UE (Unités d'enseignement or Modules), each worth a defined number of European credits (ECTS). A student accumulates those credits, which are generally transferable between paths. A licence is awarded once 180 ECTS have been obtained; a master is awarded once 120 additional credits have been obtained.

Licence and master's degrees are offered within specific domaines and carry a specific mention. Spécialités, which are either research-oriented or professionally oriented during the second year of the Master. There are also professional licences whose objective is immediate job integration. It is possible to return to school later by continuing education or to validate professional experience (through VAE, Validation des Acquis de l’Expérience).

Higher education in France is divided between grandes écoles and public universities. The grandes écoles admit the graduates of the level Baccalauréat + 2 years of validated study (or sometimes directly after the Baccalauréat) whereas universities admit all graduates of the Baccalauréat.

Higher education in France was reshaped by the student revolts of May 1968. During the 1960s, French public universities responded to a massive explosion in the number of students (280,000 in 1962–63 to 500,000 in 1967–68) by stuffing approximately one-third of their students into hastily developed campus annexes (roughly equivalent to American satellite campuses) which lacked decent amenities, resident professors, academic traditions, or the dignity of university status. With so many students ripe for radicalization after being forced to study in such miserable conditions, change was necessary and inevitable. Rather than expand already-overwhelmed parent campuses, it was decided to split off the annexes as new universities.

As a result, French higher education, compared with other countries, is small in size with a multiplicity of establishments, each specialised in a more-or-less broad spectrum of areas. A middle-sized French city, such as Grenoble or Nancy, may have 2 or 3 universities (focused on science, sociological studies, engineering, etc.) as well as a number of other establishments specialised in higher education. In Paris and its suburbs, there are currently 11 universities (there were 13 from 1970 to 2017), none of which is specialised in one area or another, plus many smaller institutions that are highly specialised. It is not uncommon for graduate teaching programmes (master's degrees, the course part of doctorate programmes etc.) to be operated in common by several institutions, allowing the institutions to present a larger variety of courses.

In engineering schools and the professional degrees of universities, a large share of the teaching staff is often made up of non-permanent professors; instead, part-time professors are hired to teach one specific subject. Part-time professors are generally hired from neighbouring universities, research institutes or industries.

Another original feature of the French higher education system is that a large share of the scientific research is carried out by research establishments such as CNRS or INSERM, which are not formally part of the universities. However, in most cases, the research units of those establishments are located inside universities (or other higher education establishments) and jointly operated by the research establishment and the university.

In 2021, 1.65 million students are enrolled in French higher education institutions (61% in licence, 35% in master, 4% in doctorat).

=== Tuition costs ===
Higher education is mostly funded by the State which leads to very low tuition fees. For citizens of the EU, EEA, Switzerland or Quebec, the annual fees range from 170 to 380 euros per year depending on the level (licence, master, doctorat). One can therefore get a master's degree (in 5 years) for about €750–3,500. For other international students, these fees range from 2,770 to 3,770 euros. Students from low-income families can apply for scholarships, paying nominal sums for tuition or textbooks, and can receive a monthly stipend of up to €450 per month.

The tuition in public engineering schools is comparable to universities but a little higher (around €700). However, it can reach €7,000 a year for private engineering schools. Private business schools typically charge up to €12,000 a year for Bachelor programmes and up to €24,000 for Master programmes, while some elite institutions may charge €40,000 and more.

Health insurance for students is free until the age of 20 and so only the costs of living and books must be added. After the age of 20, health insurance for students costs €200 a year and covers most of the medical expenses.

Some public schools have other ways of gaining money. Some do not receive funds for class trips and other extra activities and so those schools may ask for a small entrance fee for new students.

=== Universities ===
==== Public universities ====
The public universities in France are named after the major cities near which they are located, followed by a numeral if there are several. Paris, for example, has 13 universities, labelled Paris I to XIII. Some of them are in Paris itself, some in the suburbs. In addition, most of the universities have taken a more informal name that is usually that of a famous person or a particular place. Sometimes, it is also a way to honor a famous alumnus, for example the science university in Strasbourg is known as "Université Louis-Pasteur" while its official name is "Université Strasbourg I" (however, since 2009, the three universities of Strasbourg have been merged).

The French system has undergone a reform, the Bologna process, which aims at creating European standards for university studies, most notably a similar time-frame everywhere, with three years devoted to the bachelor's degree ("Licence" in French), two for the Master's degree, and three for the doctorate. French universities have also adopted the ECTS credit system (for example, a licence is worth 180 credits). The traditional curriculum based on end of semester examinations tends to remain in place in some universities. That double standard has added complexity to a system. It is difficult to change a major during undergraduate studies without losing a semester or even a whole year. Students usually also have few course selection options once they enroll in a particular diploma.

There are about 4,000 Master programmes offered in the French university system (listed at trouvermonmaster.gouv.fr), and 17,000 undergraduate programmes (offered by Parcoursup).

==== IUTs ====
There are also the IUTs (University Technical Institutes). This is a type of university college, usually in small and medium-sized towns, at satellite campuses of larger universities, that offers post-secondary study programmes designed to provide higher vocational education or the technical skills needed to perform the tasks of a particular and specific job. The degree awarded by IUTs is the Bachelor Universitaire de Technologie, (in English: "Bachelor of Technical Studies") which is very similar to a Bachelor of Applied Science.

==== Other universities ====
France also hosts rare catholic universities recognized by the French Government as "free" private colleges (Facultés Libres), the largest one being the Catholic University of Lille. There are also branch colleges of foreign universities, which include Baruch College, the University of London Institute in Paris, Parsons Paris School of Art and Design and the American University of Paris.

=== Public and private Grandes écoles ===
The grandes écoles of France are elite higher-education institutions. They are generally focused on a single subject area (e.g., engineering or business), have a small size (typically between 100 and 300 graduates per year), and are highly selective. They are widely regarded as prestigious, and most of France's scientists and executives have graduated from a grande école.

National rankings are published every year by various magazines. While the rankings slightly vary from year to year, the top grandes écoles have been very stable for decades:

- science and engineering: Écoles Normales Supérieures, École polytechnique, Mines ParisTech, Télécom Paris, ISAE-Supaéro, Ponts Paristech, Ecole Nationale de l'Aviation Civile, École nationale supérieure d'ingénieurs Sud-Alsace and CentraleSupélec;
- humanities: three Écoles Normales Supérieures, École des Chartes, and CELSA – Sorbonne;
- business: HEC Paris, NEOMA Business School, ESSEC Business School, ESCP Europe, INSEAD, EMLyon, Audencia, Grenoble École de Management, INSEEC and EDHEC;
- administration and political sciences: ENA and Institutes of Political Studies (Sciences Po Aix, Sciences Po Bordeaux, Sciences Po Grenoble, Sciences Po Lille, Sciences Po Lyon, Sciences Po Paris, Sciences Po Rennes, Sciences Po Saint-Germain-en-Laye, Sciences Po Strasbourg).

=== Private higher education ===
Private higher education in France is made possible by the fundamental principle of freedom of education. The Laboulaye Law of 12 July 1875, repealed in 2000, on the freedom of higher education stipulated that "higher education is free", albeit with a few conditions to be met: declaration to the State; administrators and professors who have not been convicted; annual publication of corporate accounts.

In France, there are two main categories of private higher education colleges and universities:

- "free" private colleges (Facultés Libres): these private higher education colleges generally correspond to free faculties, most of which were created in the 19th century following the 1875 law on the freedom of higher education, and to Catholic Universities – officially "Catholic Institutes" – which may group together several free faculties. Sciences Po was a free private college until its nationalization in 1945 as a public Grande école. These institutions are not-for-profit associations, and have all obtained the French State qualification of "établissement d'enseignement supérieur privé d'intérêt général" (EESPIG);
- "technical" private colleges (Écoles Techniques): they correspond to the vast majority of private Grandes Écoles and colleges of higher education in France, a small number of which are not-for-profit associations under contract with the State through the EESPIG general interest qualification. The remainder are commercial – for-profit – companies, as well as former public consular colleges that have opted for limited company status (like HEC Paris, EMLyon, or ESSEC Business School); and private high schools offering higher education courses (STS, CPGE).

Since 2018, a public university can integrate not only public faculties, but also private colleges (which have EESPIG accreditation, which means of general interest) as part of an experimental public-private partnership. Voices have been raised in the teaching community, fearing the privatization of French public higher education and tuition fee increases.

In France, private colleges and universities cannot award national Bachelor's (Licence) and Master's degrees. They can, however, either: set up co-diploma partnerships with public universities to deliver their national diplomas, or have their own diplomas accredited by the French Ministry of Higher Education (the accredited diploma, or "Diplôme Visé"), or have their programs certified (with the Titre) by the public vocational training agency France Compétences, under the authority of the French Ministry of Labor.

=== Preparatory classes (CPGEs) ===
Preparatory classes (in French "classes préparatoires aux grandes écoles" or CPGE), widely known as prépas, are courses whose main goal is to prepare students for enrollment in a grande école. Admission to CPGEs is based on academic performance during the last two years of high school, called Première and Terminale. Only 5% of a given cohort is admitted to a prépa. CPGEs are usually located within high schools but are a part of tertiary education, which means that to be admitted, each student must have already successfully passed their Baccalauréat (or equivalent). Most CPGE receive applications from hundreds of applicants every year in April and May, and then selects students based on their own criteria. A few mainly private CPGEs, accounting for 10% of CPGEs, also have an interview process or expect student participation in local community initiatives.

The ratio of CPGE students who fail to enter any grande école is lower in scientific and business CPGEs than in humanities CPGEs.

Some preparatory classes are considered "elite", being selective, and recruiting the best students from each high school. These CPGEs guarantee their students a place in one of the top "grandes écoles". Among them are the Lycée Louis-Le-Grand, the Lycée Henri-IV, the Lycée Stanislas and the Lycée privé Sainte-Geneviève.

==== Scientific CPGEs ====
The oldest CPGEs are the science ones, which can be accessed only with a bac in science Bacheliers. Science CPGE are called TSI ("Technology and Engineering Science"), MP2I ("Mathematics, Physics, Computer Science and Engineering"), MPSI ("Mathematics, Physics and Engineering Science"), PCSI ("Physics, Chemistry, and Engineering Science") or PTSI ("Physics, Technology, and Engineering Science") in the first year, MP ("Mathematics and Physics"), MPI ("Mathematics, Physics and Computer Science"), PSI ("Physics and Engineering Science"), PC ("Physics and Chemistry") or PT ("Physics and Technology") in the second year and BCPST ("Biology, Chemistry, Physics, Life and Earth Sciences").

The first year of a CPGE is widely known as "Math Sup", or Hypotaupe, (Sup for "Classe de Mathématiques Supérieures", superior in French, meaning post-high school), and second year as "Math Spé", or Taupe, (Spés standing for "Classe de Mathématiques Spéciales", special in French). The students of these classes are known as Taupins. Both the first and second year programmes include as much as twelve hours of mathematics teaching per week, ten hours of physics, two hours of philosophy, two to four hours of (one or two) foreign languages and four to six hours of options: chemistry, SI (Engineering Industrial Science) or Theoretical Computer Science (including some programming using the Pascal or CaML programming languages, as a practical work). There are also several hours of homework, which can double the class-based workload. A well-known joke among CPGE students is that they become moles for two years, sometimes three, hence the nicknames taupe and taupin (taupe being the French word for a mole).

==== Business CPGEs ====
There are also CPGEs that are focused on economics (who prepare the admission in business schools). They are known as prépa EC (short for Economiques et Commerciales) and are divided into two parts: prépa ECS, which focuses more on mathematics, generally for those who graduated the scientific baccalauréat, and prépa ECE, which focuses more on economics, for those who were in the economics section in high school.

==== Humanities CPGEs (Hypokhâgne and Khâgne) ====
The literary and humanities CPGEs have also their own nicknames, Hypokhâgne for the first year and Khâgne for the second year. The students are called the khâgneux. Those classes prepare for schools such as the three Écoles Normales Supérieures, the École des Chartes, and sometimes Sciences Po.

There are two kinds of Khâgnes. The Khâgne de Lettres is the most common, and focuses on philosophy, French literature, history and languages. The Khâgne de Lettres et Sciences Sociales (Literature and Social Sciences), otherwise called Khâgne B/L, also includes mathematics and socio-economic sciences in addition to those literary subjects.

The students of Hypokhâgne and Khâgne (the humanities CPGE) are simultaneously enrolled in universities, and can go back to university in case of failure or if they feel unable to pass the highly competitive entrance examinations for the Écoles Normales Supérieures.

==== Colles ====
The amount of work required of the students is high. In addition to class time and homework, students spend several hours each week completing oral exams called colles (sometimes written 'khôlles' to look like a Greek word, that way of writing being initially a khâgneux's joke since khâgneux study Ancient Greek). The colles are unique to French academic education in CPGEs.

In scientific and business CPGEs, colles consist of oral examinations twice a week, in French, foreign languages (usually English, German, or Spanish), maths, physics, philosophy, or geopolitics—depending on the type of CPGE. Students, usually in groups of three or four, spend an hour facing a professor alone in a room, answering questions and solving problems.

In humanities CPGEs, colles are usually taken every quarter in every subject. Students have one hour to prepare a short presentation that takes the form of a French-style dissertation (a methodologically codified essay, typically structured in 3 parts: thesis, counter-thesis, and synthesis) in history, philosophy, etc. on a given topic, or the form of a commentaire composé (a methodologically codified form of literary criticism) in literature and foreign languages. In Ancient Greek or Latin, they involve a translation and a commentary. The student then has 20 minutes to present his/her work to the teacher, who finally asks some questions on the presentation and on the corresponding topic.

Colles are regarded as very stressful, particularly due to the high standards expected by the teachers, and the subsequent harshness that may be directed at students who do not perform adequately. But they are important insofar as they prepare the students, from the very first year, for the oral part of the highly competitive examinations, which are reserved for the few who pass the written part.

=== Recruitment of teachers ===
Decades ago, primary school teachers were educated in Écoles normales and secondary teachers recruited through the "Agrégation" examination. The situation has been diversified by the introduction in the 1950s of the CAPES examination for secondary teachers and in the 1990s by the institution of "Instituts universitaires de formation des maitres" (IUFM), which have been renamed Écoles supérieures du professorat et de l’éducation (ESPE) in 2013 and then Instituts Nationaux supérieurs du professorat et de l’éducation (INSPE) in 2019.

Precisely, school teachers are divided between :

- Primary school and kindergarten teachers (Professeurs des écoles), educated in an INSPE, have usually a "master" (Bac+5). Their weekly service is about 28 hours a week.
- Certified teachers (Professeurs certifiés), educated in both a university and an INSPE, have a "master" (Bac+5) and must pass a competitive exam called Certificat d'aptitude au professorat de l'enseignement du second degré (CAPES) in a specific domain. Their rank usually determines their geographic assignment for the first years of their careers. The majority of them are teaching in collège (middle school).
- Agrégés teachers (Professeurs agrégés) are recruited through a different competitive exam called Agrégation, of much higher level in each domain. They could either be certified teachers or external holders of at least a "master" (Bac+5) in the domain. In the latter case they must attend an additional formation in teaching in an INSPE. Agrégés teachers have a higher salary rate and reduced weekly service. The majority of them are teaching in lycée (high school).

University teachers are recruited by special commissions, and are divided between:

- "teachers-researchers" (enseignants-chercheurs), with at least a doctorate: they teach classes and conduct research in their field of expertise with a full tenure. They are either Maître de conférences (Senior lecturers), or Professeurs (Professors). A Maître de conférence must publish a reviewed work named Habilitation à diriger des recherches (HDR) (professorial thesis) in order to be allowed to become the director of studies for PhD students. The HDR is in turn necessary to be appointed as Professeur. The net pay (all insurances included) is from 2,300 to 8,800 (with extra duties) euros per month. Net salaries of over 4,000 euros per month (2011 level) are however very unusual, and limited to the small minority of teacher-researchers who have held the grade of first class full professor for at least seven years, which is rare. The maximum possible net salary for second-class full professors and chief senior lecturers (maître de conférence hors classe), the end of career status for most full-time teacher-researchers in French universities, is 3,760 euros a month (2011), and only a few of the group ever reach that level.
- Secondary school teachers who have been permanently assigned away from their original school position to teach in a university. They are not required to conduct any research but teach twice as many hours as the "teachers-researchers". They are called PRAG (professeurs agrégés) and PRCE (professeurs certifiés). Their weekly service is 15 or 18 hours. The net pay is from 1,400 to 3,900 euros per month.
- CPGE teachers are usually "agrégés" or "chaire sup", assigned by the Inspection générale according to their qualifications and competitive exam rank as well as other factors. Their weekly service is about 9 hours a week, 25 or 33 weeks a year. Net pay : from 2,000 to 7,500 euro (extra hours)
- France did a great activity of supplying training for their people, via way of means of the 1800s, France had approximately 350 eight-yr faculties and six-yr faculties. Also in the course of the 1800s, they furnished classical training to approximately 50,000 to younger guys from a long time of 10–20. Getting greater specific, the very best increase charge of training in France became in the course of the 1821–1837 whilst towns welcomed new colleges. The increase charge slowed in the course of 1837–1867 because the authorities reached thinly populated rural areas. Then, via way of means of 1867–1906, the emphasis became on deepening the first-rate of colleges and teaching. Camille Sée added secondary colleges for ladies in 1880, which became a vital pass due to the fact he furnished secondary faculty stage of training to ladies. There have been 36 such colleges in France in 1896.

== Religion ==
Religious instruction is not given by public schools (except for 6- to 18-year-old students in Alsace and Moselle under the Concordat of 1801). Laïcité (secularism) is one of the main precepts of the French Republic.

In a March 2004 ruling, the French government banned all "conspicuous religious symbols" from schools and other public institutions with the intent of preventing proselytisation and to foster a sense of tolerance among ethnic groups. Some religious groups showed their opposition, saying the law hindered the freedom of religion as protected by the French constitution.

== Statistics ==
The French Republic has 67 million inhabitants, living in the 13 regions of metropolitan France and four overseas departments (2.7 million). Despite the fact that the population is growing (up 0.4% a year), the proportion of young people under 25 is falling. There are now fewer than 19 million young people in Metropolitan France, or 32% of the total population, compared with 40% in the 1970s and 35% at the time of the 1990 census. France is seeing a slow aging of the population, however, that is less marked than in other neighbouring countries (such as Germany and Italy), especially as the annual number of births is currently increasing slightly.

Eighteen million pupils and students, a quarter of the population, are in the education system, over 2.9 million of whom are in higher education. In 2000, the French Education Minister reported that only 39 out of 75,000 state schools were "seriously violent" and some 300 were "somewhat violent".

== School violence ==
- Neuilly kindergarten hostage crisis
- Murder of Samuel Paty
- Murder of Agnès Lassalle

== See also ==
- Trouvermonmaster.gouv.fr, a Web portal listing all the masters available in France
- Parcoursup, a Web portal listing all the undergraduate programmes available in France
- Academic grading in France
- Agency for French Teaching Abroad (Agence pour l'enseignement français à l'étranger)
- Campus France (Agency for the promotion of French Higher Education)
- Conférence des Grandes Écoles (CGE)
- Conference of the Directors of French Engineering Schools (Conférence des directeurs des écoles françaises d'ingénieurs (CDEFI))
- Homeschooling in France
- Open access in France
- Nursery schools of France
- Robert-Badinter School Complex
- Education of girls in France
