= Mastère =

In France, mastères are institutional degrees awarded outside the university system. Unlike the Master's degree (France), the mastère is not recognized by the Ministry of Higher Education and Research.
