= Gildardo Gutierrez Mendez =

Mexican entrepreneur (born 1982)

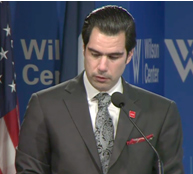
- Born: March 15, 1982 Guadalajara, Jalisco, Mexico
- Occupation: President of Asociación de Empresarios Mexicanos (Mexican Business Council), Washington, D.C.
- Education: Master in Policy Management, Georgetown University, Business Administration, Tec de Monterrey

Gildardo Gutierrez Mendez (born March 15, 1982) is a Mexican business activist and entrepreneur. He served as Secretary of Economic Development in the city of Querétaro, where more than 19,000 million pesos were invested in 2016. This made Querétaro the main destination for national and global investment within Mexico. Furthermore, he serves as Counselor of different foundations and educational institutions in Mexico and the United States. He has actively promoted international agreements on education and foreign direct investment in Mexico.

== Career ==
Founder of a series of companies, he serves on the Board of Directors of several of them. He is Founding President of the Association of Mexican Entrepreneurs (AEM) in Washington D.C.. He has encouraged the change of the narrative of Mexico in the United States, centering on the "construction of bridges" between the two countries. This has been done through collaboration with both public and private sectors.

Gutierrez is the author of FuturoEducativoDistritos (2013) (Educational Future: School Districts) and Open to the Parents of the Family (2014), which are based on the fundamentals of the need for decentralization of education in Mexico, the implementation of school districts, and the institutional role of parents in the family. Districts and Open have been presented in various academic institutions and "Think-tanks" in Mexico and the United States, including Brookings Institution. Gildardo is also the author of research papers that include the Education Series, used by the Institution of Mexico, of the Woodrow Wilson Center for International Academics. In 2016 he published the book, Central Corridor, that discusses the global agenda of global investment in Mexico, which is the subject of the Central Corridor law initiative (2017).

La Alianza Centro-Bajío que en 2019 han suscrito los Estados de Querétaro, Jalisco, San Luis Potosí, Guanajuato y Aguascalientes. It is based on the initiative of the Central Corridor and seeks to position Mexico as a destination of global investment.

Along with the initiative of the Districts law, it was presented by 18 congressmen and one citizen on November 6, 2014. In an unprecedented act, Gildardo Gutiérrez became one of the first Mexican citizens to rise to the platform in the Chamber of Congress, and as a private citizen, personally present a law initiative.

He is an active citizen in the business, social, and public policy sectors. In his pastime he enjoys reading, singing, road biking, and horses.

== Education ==
From 2000 to 2006, Gutierrez attended the Instituto Tecnológico de Estudios Superiores de Monterrey to receive his Masters in Business Administration (MBA).

In 2006, he attended the Excellence in the Government of Non-Governmental Organizations Program at Harvard Business School. In 2007, he attended "The Education of the Next Decade: Charter Schools" program at the Harvard Graduate School of Education and the Private Capital and Investments Program at Harvard Business School.

in 2008, he attended the Strategy Development and Competitive Advantages Program at China Europe International Business School.

In 2011, he attended the Development of Leadership Strategies in Operations Program at Massachusetts Institute of Technology and the Negotiation Program for Senior Management at Harvard Law School.

Finally, in 2014, he received his Masters in Public Policy Administration at the McCourt School of Public Policy of Georgetown University.
