= Mémoire =

Concept in French culture

In French culture, the word mémoire, as in un mémoire ("a master's dissertation") or des mémoires ("memoirs" or "a memoir"), reflects the writer's own experiences and memories.

== Up to the 18th century ==
The word appeared in the course of the 12th century. In this era, it simply meant an explanatory text written to show an idea. Little by little, and above all in the modern era, the term became synonymous with an argumentative piece of writing, serving and asserting an idea. Vauban also wrote mémoires to Louis XIV on fortifications, such as Mémoire pour servir d'instruction dans la conduite des sièges et dans la défense des places, par M. le maréchal de Vauban, présenté au Roi en 1704, and the religious quarrels of the time also produced several mémoires.

== Evolution in the 19th century ==
In the course of the 19th century, mémoire took on a sense that approaches the sense it holds today. It lost its polemical character and became a scientific text (or one that wanted to be scientific), for showing a fact, principal or idea. The mémoire thus became shorter and shorter, serving to enlighten the reader on a precise point such as a subject that had to be treated by the administration or politicians. All university writings in this era, however, were still called theses – mémoire did not yet have a university sense.

== University mémoires ==
The development of using mémoire to mean a piece of university writing occurred in the course of the 20th century. In effect, the organisation of university studies made it necessary to have a more precise definition, which create the level of "maîtrise".

A "maîtrise" (now called Master 1) student's work, if it was original research, could not be called a thesis, for the student generally did not invent a concept or a new theory at this level. The term "mémoire" thus often came to be used, as it fitted this subject well - showing a fact, research, in a relatively boiled-down format.

The pursuit of apprenticeships in research work involved students in editing a "second mémoire", at Master 2 (formerly DEA) level, often as a feasibility study for a full thesis. This too was of quite a boiled-down format and showed the tools which would eventually allow the student to set out on a thesis. For a Master 2 in social sciences or literature, a "mémoire" comprises a description of the sources which would allow future work on a thesis, the necessary bibliography, an exposé of the problems involved as defined by the student, and one or two attempts at edited-down chapters, showing that the problems, sources and bibliography could lead to a real work of original research.

On the other hand, one rarely speaks of a "mémoire de thèse", as this is too voluminous, and its usage is only to qualify that the thesis is all the student's own work.
