= Frank Bournois =

French academic

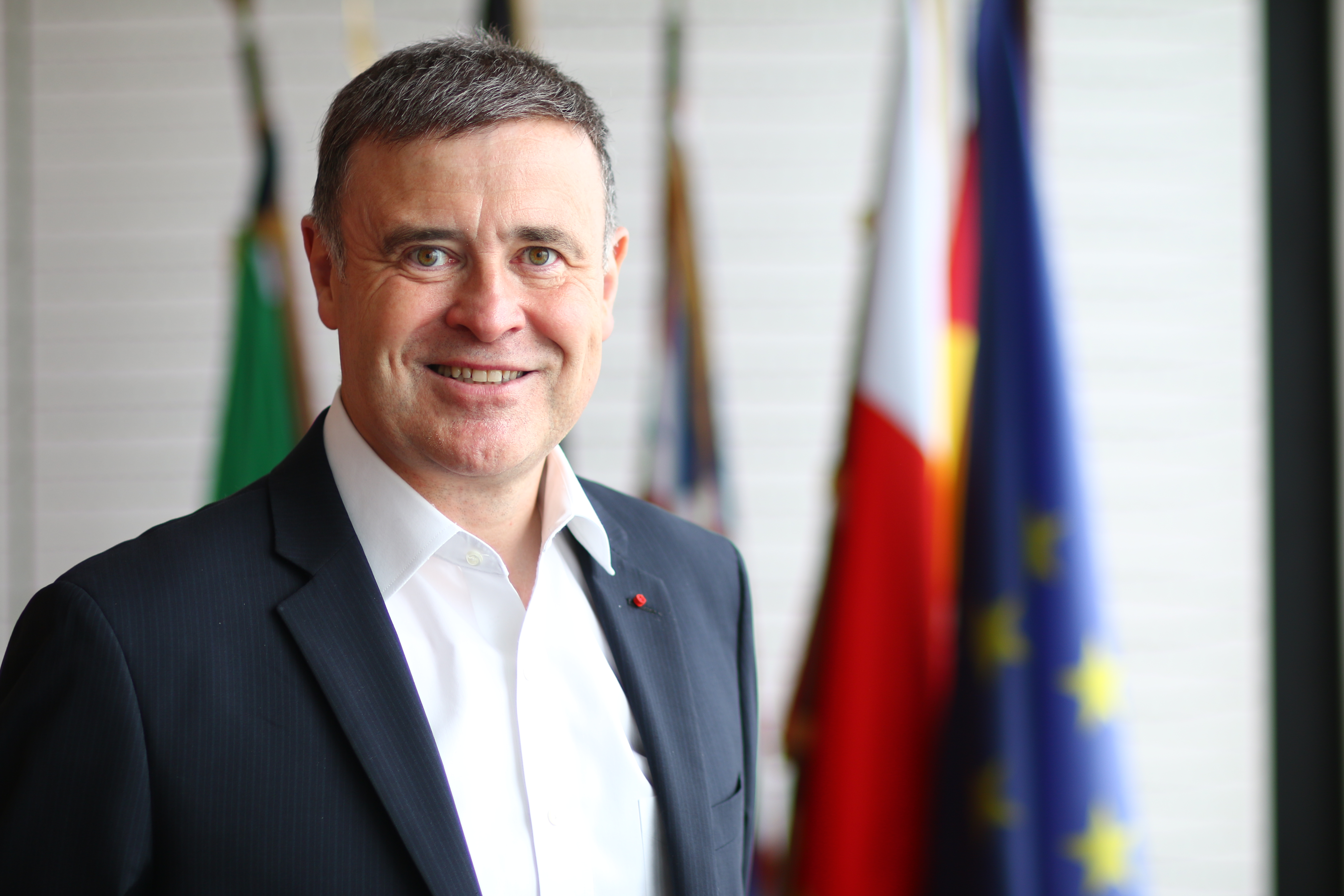

Vice-President and Dean of CEIBS
- Incumbent
- Assumed office 1 April 2023

Personal details
- Born: 23 November 1962 (age 63) Corbie, France
- Education: Emlyon Business School

Frank Bournois (born 23 November 1962) is a French academic. He was appointed on 17 February 2023 to be the vice-president and dean of CEIBS, effective 1 April 2023, under the presidency of Professor Wang Hong and Dominique Turpin. He was previously the Executive President and dean of ESCP Business School from August 2014 to January 2023, and professor of general management, European management and cross-cultural leadership at Panthéon-Assas University (Paris II). He specialises in the study of how very large corporate organisations identify, develop and manage their future top level leaders.

== Academic records ==
Frank Bournois graduated from the Emlyon Business School in 1984 (France); and received an MBA in organisational psychology of Aston University (UK). He received a doctorate from Jean Moulin University Lyon 3 in 1990, with a dissertation on The Management of Top Managers and the Development of High Potential Executives in large European Companies.

After a professional start as an HR officer at Rhône-Poulenc, a professor of strategic Human resource management at ESC Lyon Business School then at IAE de Lyon (University of Lyon III), a senior lecturer (1993) then professor (1995) of international management. Visiting professor in several universities (Oxford, Cranfield School of Management, Utah, Liverpool). Between 2013 and 2014, he was a visiting scholar at Princeton University in collaboration with Prof. Ezra Suleiman, IBM Professor in International Studies.

He was appointed professor of management in 1995 at the University of Lyon III then at the Panthéon-Assas University in 1997. In 1996 he succeeded as director of at University of Lyon III.

== Official positions ==
Defence : Artillery officer. Former auditor of the French National Institute for Defence Studies – IHEDN in 1996–1997. Head of the Department of Defence Studies at the French National Institute for Defence Studies (1997–2001). He initiated a large scale survey on business intelligence practices in all French companies with more than 250 employees. This survey was the first to be launched in France based on a large statistical sample of some 1,200 respondents. Results were published in 2000 (L'Intelligence économique et stratégique dans les grandes entreprises françaises, Editions Economica).

Higher education : Chairman (2010–2013) of the National Committee for the Evaluation and Accreditation of Business Schools reporting to the Ministers of Higher Education and Industry. Advisor (2000–2001) to the Director of Higher Education (Ministry of National Education). Member of the board (2011–2014) of the Deutsch-Französische Hochschule – the Franco-German University (Saarbrücken – Germany). Vice-Chairman for Digital Education at the "Conférence des Grandes écoles"

Labour and employment: Gérard Larcher, Minister for Labour and Employment appointed Frank Bournois (2004–2008) as Chairman of the Audit and Evaluation Committee of AFPA – the French National Agency for Adult Vocational Training. Chairman of the Advisory and Ethics Board of the National Federation of Top Managers (Fédération Nationale des Cadres Dirigeants – FNCD).

Society: Member of the advisory board of Institut Montaigne.

== Executive governance and top management teams ==
Frank Bournois developed an early interest for the nature of managerial and top leadership work. He led several research programmes including comparative HR management across Europe (1988–1997), business intelligence (1997–2001) and corporate governance (2001–2010). Cegetel, a leading telecoms company, supported the ESCP Business School Chair of Corporate Governance. Academics and business leaders convened to analyze the subtleties of the dynamics of executive committees. The concept of executive governance (dirigeance in French) was elaborated during that period.

He is a regular speaker on the topic of benchmarking large European companies, prospective screening of management changes, the prevention of career derailment for leaders and generally what makes organisations and management committees effective or dysfunctional.

In 2012, Ezra Suleiman (Princeton University), Yasmina Jaidi and Frank Bournois (Université Panthéon Assas Paris II) conducted a large survey on « French Management as Experienced by Non-French Managers ». The survey results highlight that French management is very specific. The key features of French management are investigated and analyzed using the 3,000+ responses (June 2014) that were gleaned from non French managers working in French CAC 40 companies. Results show what makes French management attractive (creativity, flexibility, using networks effectively,...) and also expectations about what may be improved (e.g. less centralisation, less hierarchy, less implicitness ,...). This research led to the publication of a book by the three authors, La Prouesse française.

== Other ==
Life Fellow of the Royal Society of Arts (GB).

Doctorate Honoris Causa from City, University of London.

Officer in National Order of the Legion of Honour (2016-France).

Commander in French National Order of Merit (2022-France).

Commander in Order of Arts and Letters (2017-France).

Gold Medal in National Education (2011-Lebanon).

Independent Member of the Mazars Group Governance Council.

== Main publications ==
He is author or co-author of :

- Intelligence économique et stratégique dans les grandes entreprises françaises, 2000, Editions Economica
- The Handbook of Top Management Teams, 2010, London, Palgrave
- L’intelligence sportive au service du manager, (2009)
- Managerial Psychology in 3 volumes, (2008)
- Le Grand livre du coaching, (2008)
- Comités Exécutifs – voyage au cœur de la dirigeance (2007)
- RH- Les meilleures pratiques du CAC40 et du SBF120, (2007)
- Pourquoi j’irais travailler ?, (2003)
- R.H. Les meilleures pratiques du CAC40, (2003)
- Cross Cultural Approaches to Leadership Development, (2002)
- Le livre d'or du coaching, (2013)
- Intelligence économique, lobbying et valeurs publiques (2013)
- La prouesse française (2017)
