= Yu Rong (businessman) =

Chinese billionaire

Yu Rong is a Chinese billionaire who chairs the health services firm Meinian Onehealth. He currently resides in Shanghai, and graduated from China Europe International Business School.
