= Xu Xiaonian =

Chinese economist

- 许小年
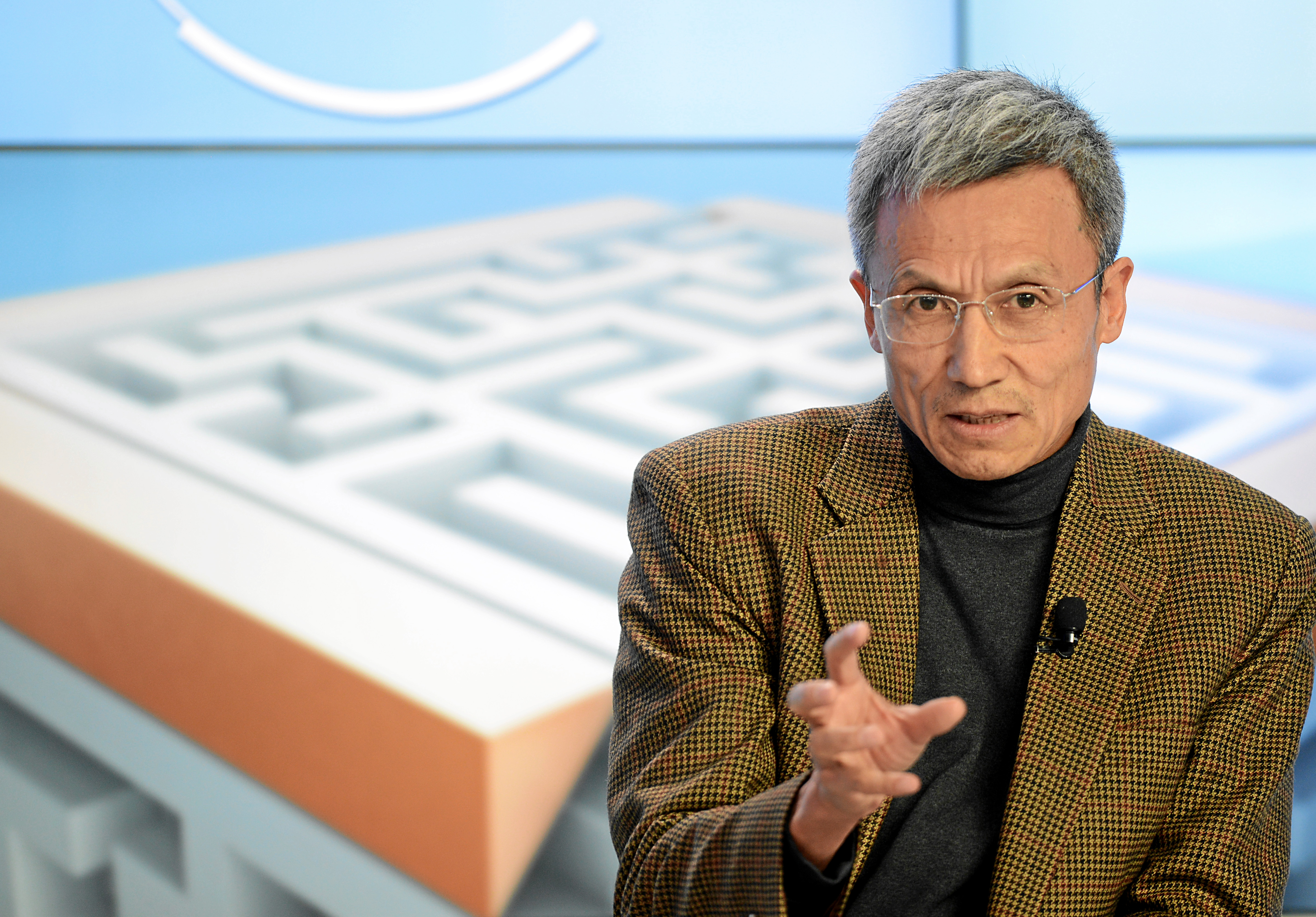
- Xiaonian during the WEF 2013
- Born: 1953 (age 72–73)
- Education: Xi'an Jiaotong University; Renmin University of China; University of California

Xu Xiaonian (Chinese: 许小年; born 1953) is Professor of Economics and Finance at China Europe International Business School, named by Businessweek as one of China's Most Powerful People in 2009. From 1981 to 1985, he worked at Center of Development and Research, State Council of the People's Republic of China as Research Fellow. He got Doctor of Economics at University of California, Davis in 1991. From 1991 to 1995, he worked as assistant professor at Amherst College. In 1999, he became the Managing Director and Head of Research at China International Capital Corporation Limited, a position he held until 2004.

== Views ==
Xu is a Chinese liberal.

Xu is a critic of the idea of a China Model and contends, "Confucianism, the market, and the political system of the Mao Zedong era are incompatible."
