= Maymunah Kadiri =

Nigerian mental health advocate

Maymunah Yusuf Kadiri
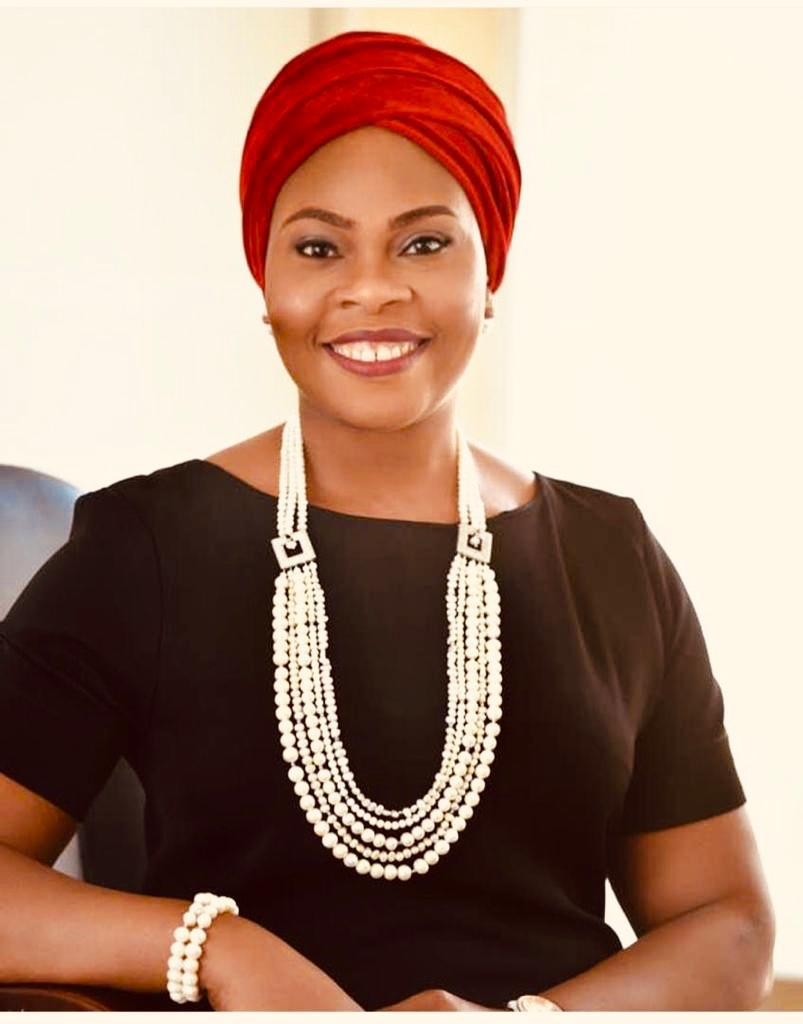
- Born: Nigeria
- Education: China European International Business School, Albert Ellis Institute, New York, USA, National Post-Graduate Medical College of Physicians
- Occupations: Mental health Advocate, Psychiatrist, Psychotherapist

Maymunah Yusuf Kadiri is a Nigerian mental health advocate, psychiatrist, and psychotherapist. She advocates for mental health by speaking at events, television shows and as a columnist at the Guardian Newspapers. She produced Little Drops Of Happy in 2017 to create awareness about mental health in Nigeria. She is the founder of Pinnacle Medical Services Limited.

== Education ==
Maymunah trained at Federal Neuro-Psychiatric Hospital, Yaba until 2012. She is a graduate of the China European International Business School. She is also a trained rational emotive and cognitive behavioural therapist from Albert Ellis Institute, New York, USA. She is a Goldman Sachs scholar in Entrepreneurial management and a Fellow of the National Post-Graduate Medical College of Physicians (FMCPsych).
