= Clotilde Delbos =

French businesswoman

- Born: Clotilde Fricker; September 1967 (age 58); Nancy, France
- Education: Emlyon Business School
- Occupation: Businesswoman

Clotilde Delbos (born 1967) is a French businesswoman who has been the deputy chief executive officer (CEO) and chief financial officer (CFO) of Renault since 1 January 2021. She was the CEO of Mobilize brand till 2023.

She is notable for taking control of Renault after the unusual circumstances in which two of her predecessors were forced out of the French automobile company. Her immediate predecessor Thierry Bolloré was ousted in a coup and his predecessor Carlos Ghosn was detained in Japan.

Her rise to the top echelons of Renault after the ouster of her predecessor Thierry Bolloré, was described as nothing short of a business coup by the BBC, and a major turning point in the relationship between the two corporate automobile giants Renault and Nissan.

== Life ==
She is married and has three children.

== Education ==
She is a graduate of the Emlyon Business School, a leading French business school.

== Career ==
She started her career in California. She has worked for a number of companies including the French subsidiary of PricewaterhouseCoopers, Pechiney Group, Alcan and Apollo Global Management.

=== Aluminium industry ===
She has worked for a number of companies in the Aluminium Industry including Pechiney Group, Alcan and Constellium.

=== Banking industry ===
Her brief stint in the French banking industry includes positions at RCI Banque, the financial services arm of the Renault company.

=== Renault ===
Delbos joined the Groupe Renault in 2012 as Group Controller. In 2014, she was appointed the Alliance Global Director, Control, in addition to her current role as Senior Vice President, Groupe Renault Controller.

In July 2020, Delbos became Deputy Chief Executive Officer of Groupe Renault. She is simultaneously the Chief Financial Officer of Groupe Renault.

== Other activities ==
=== Corporate boards ===
- Sanofi, Independent Member of the Board of Directors (since 2024)
- Axa, Member of the Board of Directors (since 2021)
- Alstom, Independent Member of the Board of Directors
- RCI Banque, Member of the Board of Directors (since 2014), Chair of the Board of Directors (since 2016)

=== Non-profit organizations ===
- French Rugby Federation, General Treasurer and Member of the Strategic Committee (since 2024)
- World Rugby, Member of the Council (since 2024)

== Recognition ==
On 1 December 2020, she was named as the Femme de l’année (in English: Woman of the Year) by the journalists of the business magazine Women and Vehicles in Europe (WAVE).

As one of Renault's most senior executives, she has given a number of interviews and has appeared on a number of magazine covers.

She is only the second female chief executive in the global automobile industry, after Mary Barra, a fact which has been noted by several French business magazines.
