= Monmaster.gouv.fr =

Web portal listing all French master's degrees

monmaster.gouv.fr
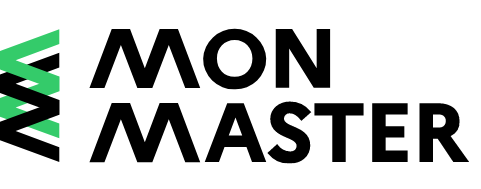
- Website type: Academic portal
- Available in: French
- Country of origin: France
- Owner: Minister of Higher Education, Research and Space (France)
- Website: monmaster.gouv.fr
- Advertising: no
- Commercial: no
- Registration: Optional
- Launched: 1 February 2017; 9 years ago
- Current status: active

monmaster.gouv.fr (formerly trouvermonmaster.gouv.fr) is a Web portal that lists all national master's degrees in France, as well as the procedures for applying for them, the number of places available, the selection criteria and the timetable.

Launched in 2017, the site only provided a list of all master's degrees, and students had to send their applications to the relevant institutions. Since 2023, the site directly collects applications, in a national annual procedure which takes place between March and September.

The search for a Master's degree is carried out using several criteria: by discipline ("mention"), by sub-discipline ("parcours"), keyword, name of the institution, its location. The results include the number of places available as well as a direct weblink to the institutions and the full description of the courses. The results can be sorted and saved using bookmarks ("favoris").

Not all graduate programmes are listed, only those accredited by the French Ministry of Higher Education and Research.

Copy of a French diploma of master (2010)

== Facts ==
Launched on 1 February 2017, the portal lists 4,883 Masters degrees in its first year, 4,826 in 2018, 3,571 in 2020, 3,735 in 2020.

Number of masters by region, according to Trouvermonmaster.gouv.fr
Region	2018	2020	2022
Auvergne-Rhône-Alpes	458	472	501
Bourgogne-Franche-Comté	122	129	129
Bretagne	239	234	251
Centre-Val de Loire	185	92	92
Corse	28	24	24
Grand Est	551	264	260
Guadeloupe	33	28	27
Guyane	13	9	11
Hauts-de-France	275	294	296
Ile-de-France	1290	815	872
La Réunion	35	36	37
Normandie	148	148	157
Nouvelle-Calédonie	8	9	10
Nouvelle-Aquitaine	296	262	277
Occitanie	323	347	373
Pays de la Loire	161	189	200
Polynésie française	10	9	9
Provence-Alpes-Côte d'Azur	651	210	109
Total	4826	3571	3735

From the outset, the possibility of transforming the trouvermonmaster.gouv.fr website into a registration website, like Parcoursup for undergraduate programmes, was raised. In 2022, the launch of the new site was cancelled at the last minute due to opposition from both academics and student associations.

== Selection of applications ==
Since 2016, universities have been allowed to select their master's students. The « Je suis accompagné » ("I am accompanied") service offers students who have not received a positive response to their application the possibility to receive support from the Ministry in order to obtain a place in a Master's programme. This procedure has given rise to some uncertainty and criticism. 3300 students were able to use this procedure at the start of the 2017 academic year, of whom 735 found a place.

== Prices and cost of education in France ==
The French education system is dual: most masters are free (or very limited fees: about 400 €/year for nationals, or 3000 €/year for foreigners), but some private schools are as expensive as their equivalent in the Anglo-Saxon world.

== See also ==
- Master's degree (France)
- Master's degree in Europe
- Parcoursup, academic portal for undergraduate studies in France
- French Ministry of Higher Education, Research and Innovation
- France's education system
