= Emlyon Business School =

Business school in Lyon, France

EM Lyon Business School
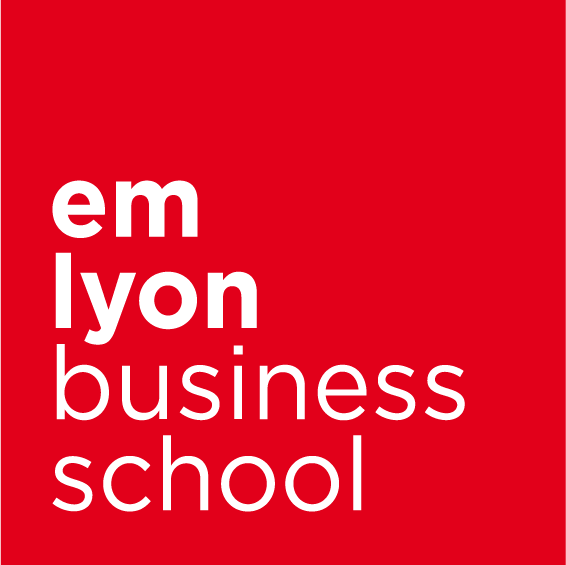
- Motto: Early makers since 1872
- Type: Grande école de commerce et de management (Private research university Business school)
- Established: 1872; 154 years ago
- Accreditation: Triple accreditation: AACSB; AMBA; EQUIS
- Academic affiliations: Conférence des grandes écoles; Alliance Lyon Grenoble Business School
- Budget: €156 million
- Chairman: Isabelle Huault
- Academic staff: 160 permanent professors 99% Ph.D. 40% female; 63% international
- Students: 8,900 (undergraduate and postgraduate); 6,900 (executive); 121 nationalities
- Location: France: Lyon, Paris; China: Shanghai; India: Mumbai; 45°47′10″N 4°45′50″E
- Language: English-only & French-only instruction
- Colors: Red
- Website: www.em-lyon.com/en/

Locations in France
Worldwide locations

EM Lyon Business School (styled emlyon) is a business school in Lyon, France, established in 1872, and affiliated with the Lyon Chamber of Commerce and Industry. A grande école de commerce, EM Lyon Business School offers a range of academic programs, including the Global BBA, Masters in Management, M.Sc. in Finance, MBA, and Exec. MBA degrees, alongside Specialized Masters (M.Sc., M.S.) programs, and a Ph.D. program in Management. The school also provides a wide portfolio of Executive Education programs for senior executives & experienced managers.

The school maintains four campuses: in Lyon and Paris in France, Shanghai in China, and Mumbai in India. EM Lyon Business School is a member of the Conférence des Grandes Écoles, and holds the Triple Accreditation status (EQUIS, AACSB, and AMBA).

Ranked among the best business schools in Europe, EM Lyon Business School stands as a #Top10 Business School in the FT European Business Schools ranking. Among the programs, its flagship Masters in Management (Programme Grande École) is ranked 8th globally in the 2024 FT MiM ranking.

== History ==
EM Lyon Business School was established in 1872 and is one of the oldest business schools in France. Formerly known as ESCAE Lyon, ÉSC de Lyon, and EM Lyon, the school has been namedEM Lyon Business School since 2016. In September 2018, EM Lyon Business School, historically belonging to the Lyon Métropole Saint-Étienne Roanne Chamber of Commerce and Industry (lCC), became a public limited company. Since then, EM Lyon Business School has been a subsidiary of Early Makers Group SA, whose capital is open to alumni, group employees, and investment funds Bpifrance and Qualium, while being managed by CCI Lyon Métropole.

- 1872: Ecole Supérieure de Commerce de Lyon (ESC Lyon) founded with support from the public Lyon Chamber of Commerce.
- 1972: New campus opened in Ecully, France.
- 1997: ESC Lyon is renamed Ecole de Management de Lyon (EM LYON).
- 2005: Awarded the Triple Crown: AMBA, EQUIS and AACSB accreditation.
- 2007: Shanghai Campus established in China.
- 2014: New campus opened in Saint-Étienne, France.
- 2015: Casablanca Campus established in Morocco. | Partnership with IBM.
- 2016: Establishment of Paris Campus in France.
- 2016: Establishment of Alliance Lyon Grenoble Business School, with Grenoble École de Management.
- 2018: Bhubaneswar Campus established in India in collaboration with Xavier University. School legal structure is changed to a: Public Limited Company.
- 2021: Mumbai Campus established in India in partnership with St. Xavier's College, Mumbai.

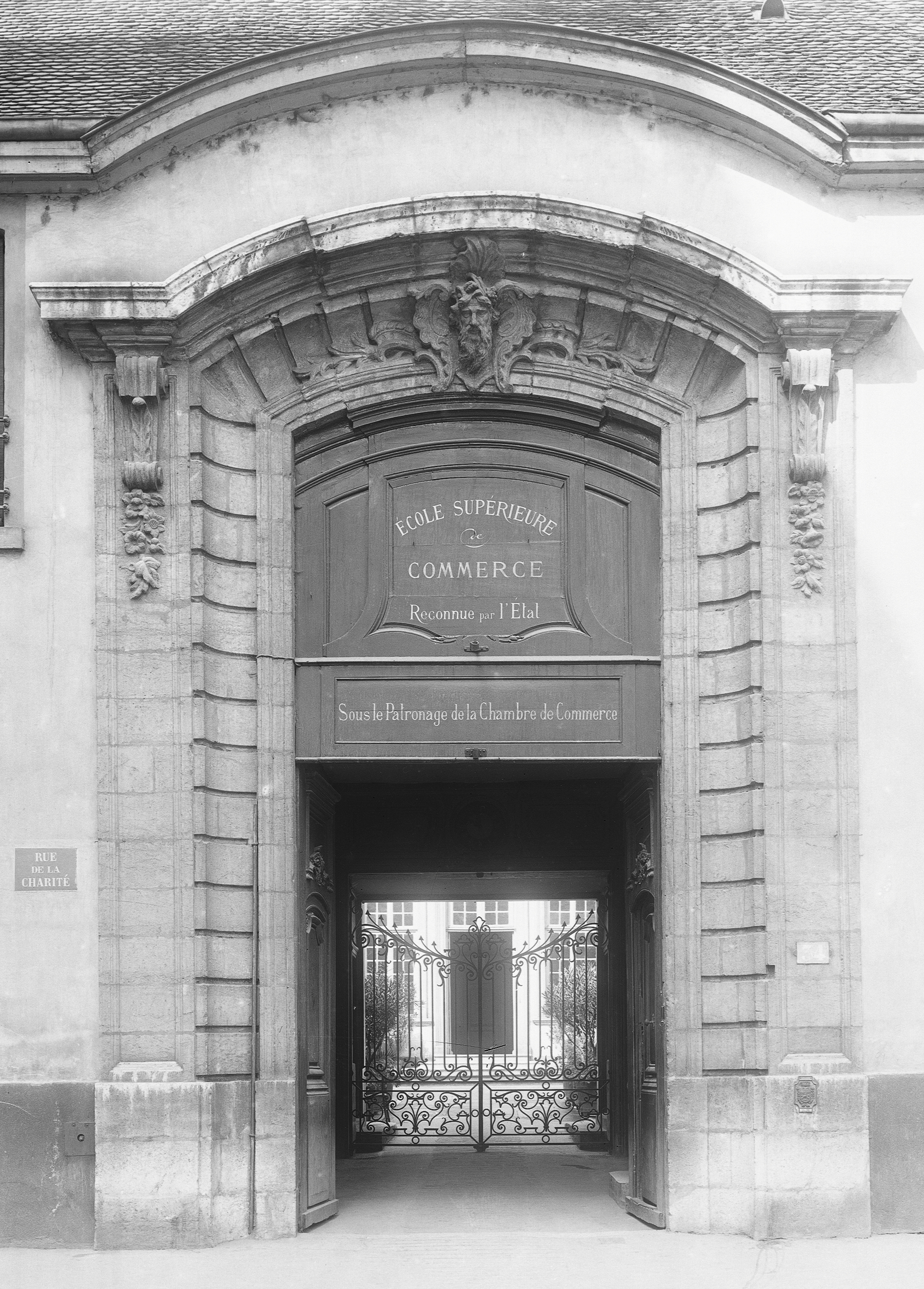
École Supérieure de Commerce de Lyon - Portail d'entrée (ca.1900)

== International rankings ==
	2021	2022	2023	2024	2025
Business School rankings					
FT (European Business Schools)	19th	12th	10th	11th	
QS Subject Ranking: Business & Management Studies	66th	53rd	56th	63rd	
Masters in Management: M.Sc. in Management (Programme Grande École)					
FT: Masters in Management	21st	9th	7th	8th	
QS: Masters in Management	14th	10th	12th	13th	17th
Masters in Finance: M.Sc. in Finance					
FT: Master in Finance (Pre-Experience)	15th	-	17th	15th	
QS: Masters in Finance	16th	16th	17th	17th	19th
MBA					
FT: Global MBA	90th	89th	76th	57th	
QS: Global MBA	97th	62nd	55th	54th	
Executive MBA					
FT: Global EMBA	61st	47th	36th	40th	
QS: Executive MBA	30th	27th	24th	22nd	
Executive Education					
FT: Executive Education: Open Programs	-	41st	21st	22nd	
FT: Executive Education: Custom Programs	-	16th	28th	35th	
Specialised Masters Programs					
QS: Masters in Business Analytics	26th	23rd	27th	26th	29th
QS: Masters in Marketing	8th	8th	7th	6th	8th
QS: Masters in Supply Chain Management	-	-	-	5th	4th

EM Lyon Business School ranks among the top 50 universities globally in the Global Employability University Ranking (GUERS). Among Business Schools, it ranks #2 in France (after HEC Paris), and has retained its position in the Global Top 50 for the fifth consecutive year.

== Notable alumni ==
The alumni association of EM Lyon Business School is called EM Lyon Forever, and counts over 35000+ alumni in 130 countries.

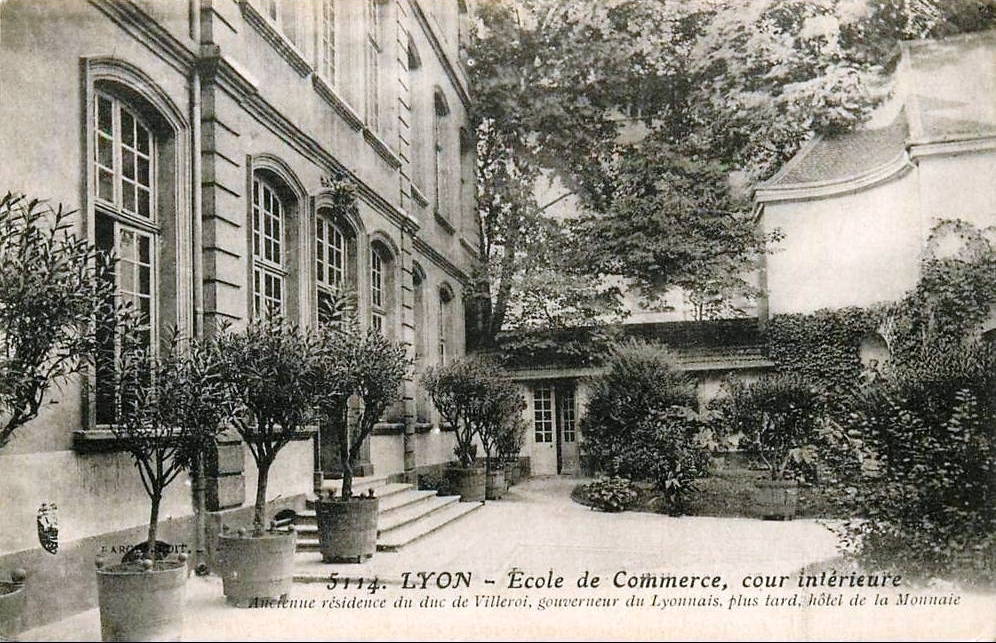
Lyon - École de Commerce - Cour intérieure Ancienne résidence du duc de Villeroi, gouverneur du Lyonnais, plus tard, hôtel de la Monnaie (ca.1900)

- Jean-Pascal Tricoire, MBA, chairman and CEO of Schneider Electric
- Alexandre Popoff, Executive VP Eastern Europe, Africa, Middle East at L’Oréal
- Florence Pourchet Co-head of Global Banking Americas, Head of CIB Hispanic LATAM at BNP Paribas CIB
- Isabelle Huault, Présidente Université Paris Dauphine
- Florence Rollet, Former head of Marketing at Julius Baer Group and European VP for Tiffany and Co.
- Marion Maréchal, MBA, French Politician
- Bernard Fornas, Former Chairman and CEO of Cartier (jeweler), Former Co-CEO of the Richemont Group
- Emmanuel Trivin, CEO of Butagaz
- Patrick Dupuis, Global CFO of PayPal
- Clotilde Delbos, deputy CEO of Renault
- Gwendal Peizerat, Olympic Champion Ice Dancer
- Frank Bournois, Dean of ESCP Business School
- Valérie Chapoulaud-Floquet, former CEO of Rémy Cointreau

== See also ==
- Conférence des Grandes écoles
- Education in France
- University of Lyon
