= Lycée Rodin =

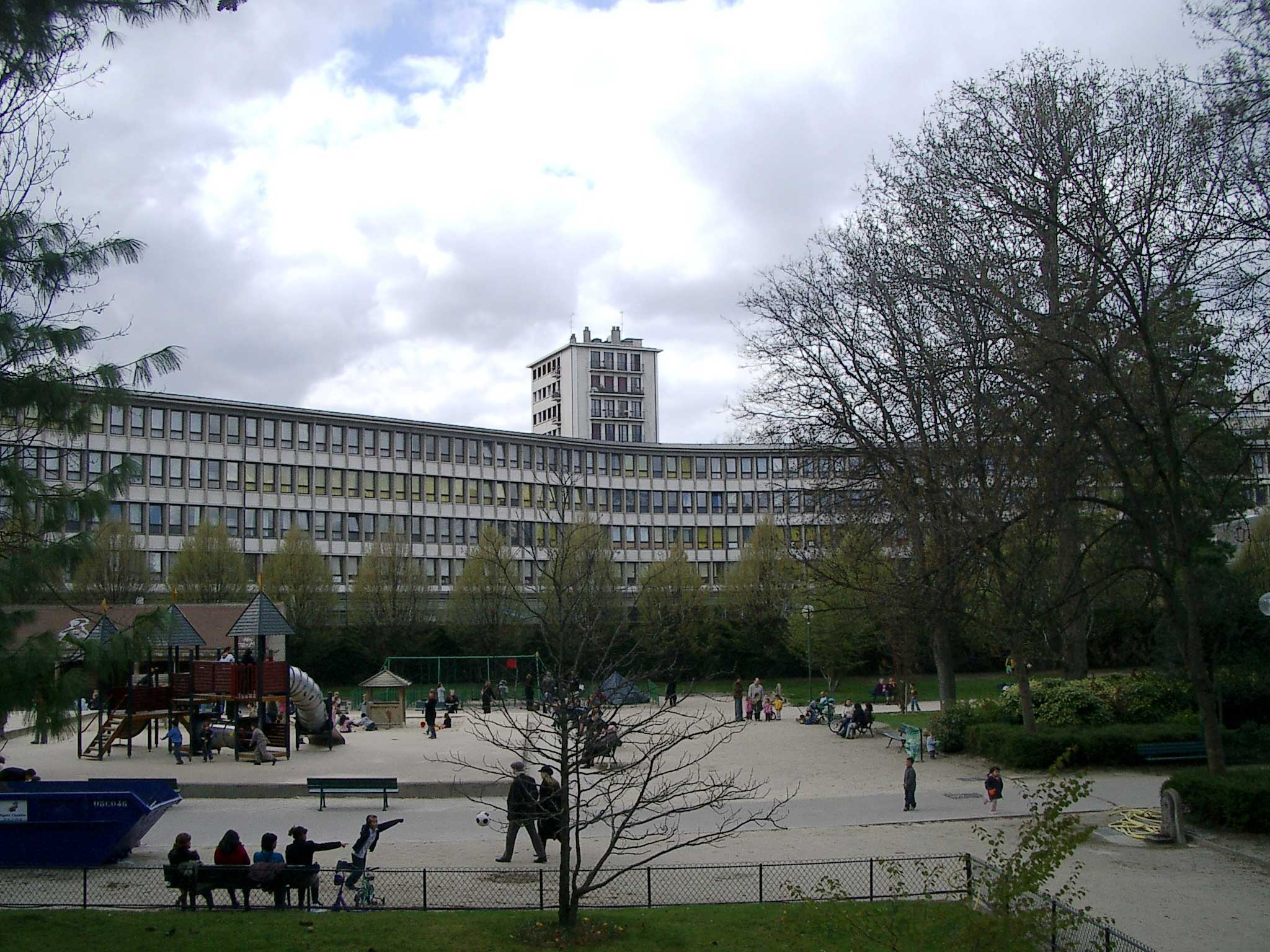
- Lycée Rodin from square René-Le Gall.

Location
- 19 rue Corvisart, Paris; France
- Coordinates: 48.832464°N 2.348102°E

Information
- Type: Établissement public local d'enseignement (EPLE)
- Principal: Mme J. Bouvry
- Enrollment: ~1,200 students
- Website: www.lyc-rodin.ac-paris.fr

The Lycée Rodin is a French secondary and higher school located at 19, rue Corvisart in Paris, in the 13th arrondissement of Paris. The school is named after Auguste Rodin, who was born and raised in the area.

== History ==
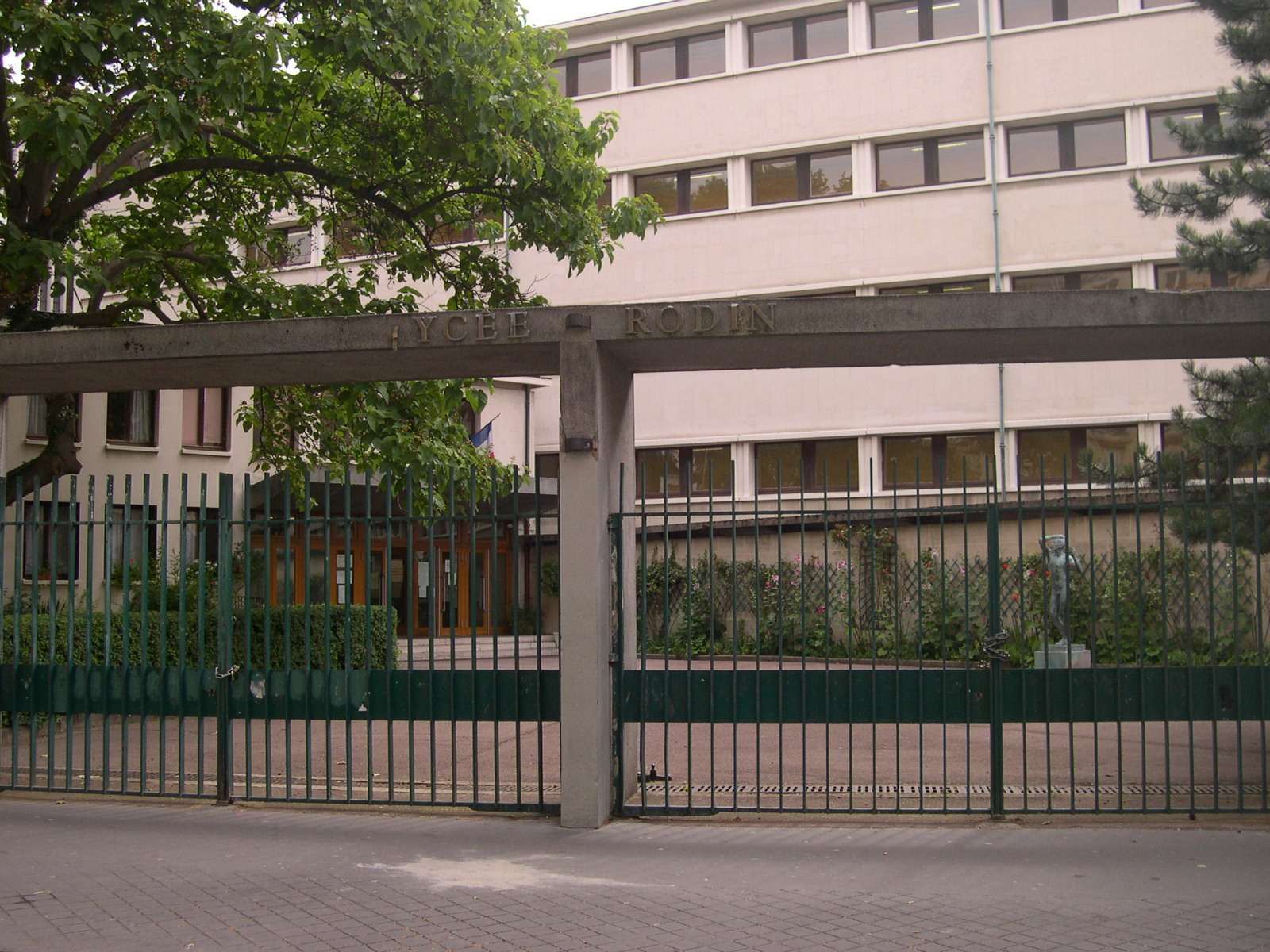
Entrance to the lycée Rodin

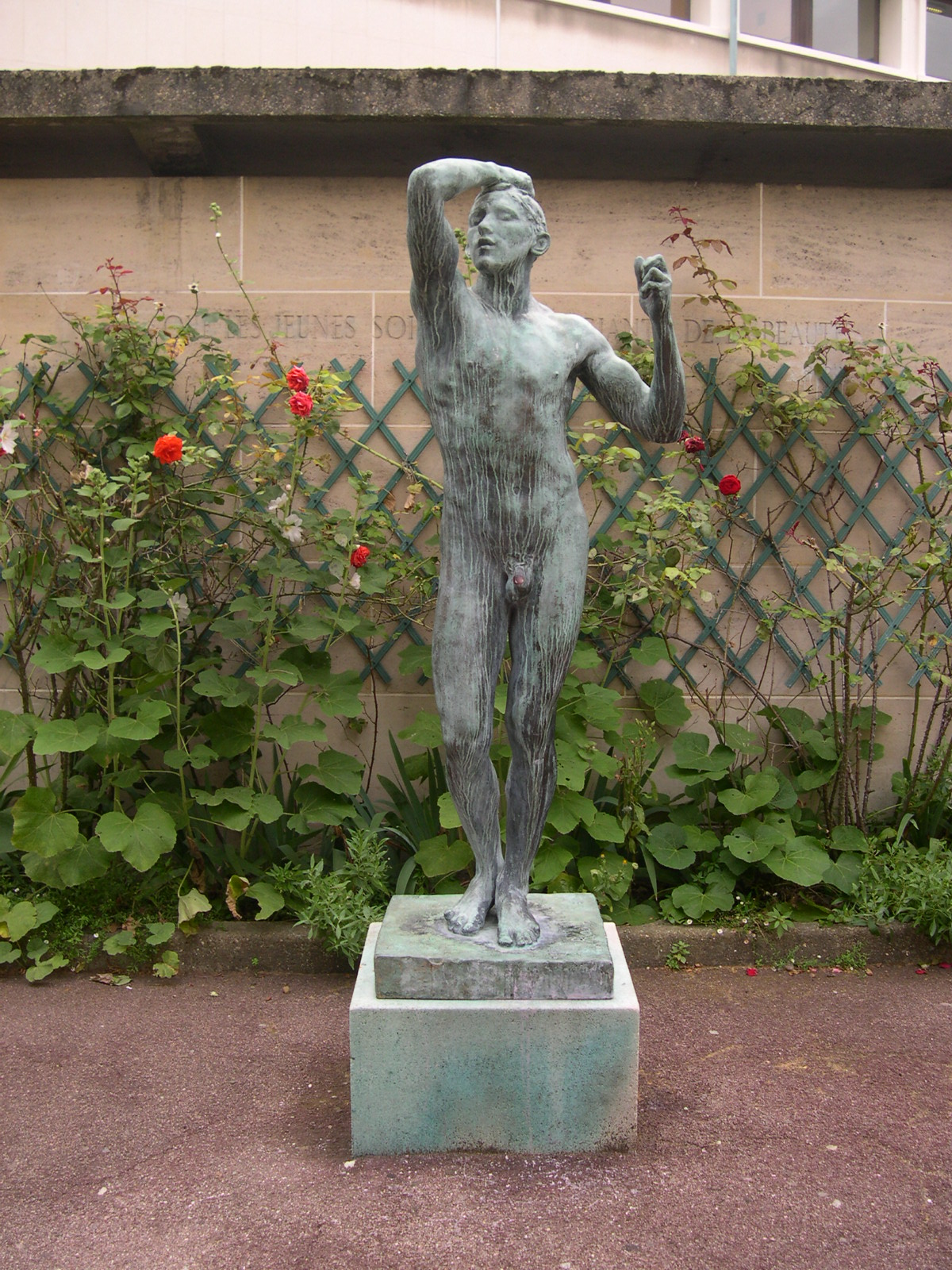
L'Âge d'airain in the courtyard

Originally, the lycée and collège sections were annexes of the lycée Montaigne, known as "Annexe des Cordelières" due to the convent of the Poor Clares located next door. In 1956, classes moved to prefabricated buildings and temporary installations. The current building was built in the 1960s. It resembles a bird spreading its wings. A residential tower is inside.

The "History of Arts" option was launched for the first time for L in 1993 and at secondary level in 1994.

== Facilities ==
Lycée Rodin, which also contains a college, can support around 2,000 students (currently around 1,600). It is a general lycée, and prepares for ES, L and S. Clubs cover socio-educational needs, including for chess, cooking, English-language theatre, photography, yoga and cinema. Sports clubs for AS, collège, and lycée include badminton, football, badminton, basketball, gymnastics, and climbing.

The lycée Rodin has been a pilot for interdisciplinary teaching. Reforms in 2010 removed old-style deterministic teaching, but lycée Rodin maintains this teaching practice in the form of "workshops". This allows all students to attend lectures on methodical readings of works of art, and for future students to better approach their specialty program (coefficient 6 of the baccalauréat).

== Ranking ==
In 2015, the lycée was ranked 73rd out of 109 at departemental level on quality of teaching, and 962nd at national level. The ranking was based on the level of baccalauréat results, the proportion of students who obtain a baccalauréat having spent their last two years at the establishment, and "added value" (calculated based on social origin of students, their age, and their national diploma results).

=== CPGE rankings ===
The national rankings for preparatory classes to grandes écoles (CPGE) are based on rates of admission to the grandes écoles.

In 2016, L'Étudiant gave the following rankings for 2015 :

Stream	Students admitted to a grande école	Admission rate^{*}	Average rate over 5 years
ECE	0 / 34 students	0%	1.3%
Source : Classement 2015 des prépas - L'Étudiant (Concours de 2014). * the rate of admission depends upon the grandes écoles included in the study. For example, for the ECE and ECS streams, these are HEC, ESSEC, and ESCP.

== Notable alumni ==
- Jean-Paul Huchon, politician, President of the regional council of Île-de-France from 1998 until 2015.
- Cédric Klapisch, director, actor, and producer.
- Philippe Decouflé, French dancer and choreographer.
- Emmanuel Demarcy-Mota, actor, dramatists, and theatre director.
- Jacno (Denis Quilliard), French composer and musician, founder of the punk group Stinky Toys.
- Romain Duris, French cinema actor
- Santiago Amigorena, director and writer
- Jérémie Mondon, composer and electronic music producer.
- Nathalie Nell, actress
- Régis Schleicher, member of terrorist organization Action directe.
- Didier François, journalist
- Noémie Lvovsky, actress and director.
- Lomepal, rapper, singer, and skater.

== Former teachers ==
- Jacques Borel, writer, Prix Goncourt 1965 for his novel L'Adoration (Gallimard).
- Marc Ferro, historian, teacher of history/geography.
- Writer Leïla Sebbar (Leïla Pignon), French teacher.

== Bibliography ==
- M. Deixonne, Le Lycée Rodin
