= Dominique Turpin =

French marketing professor (born 1957)

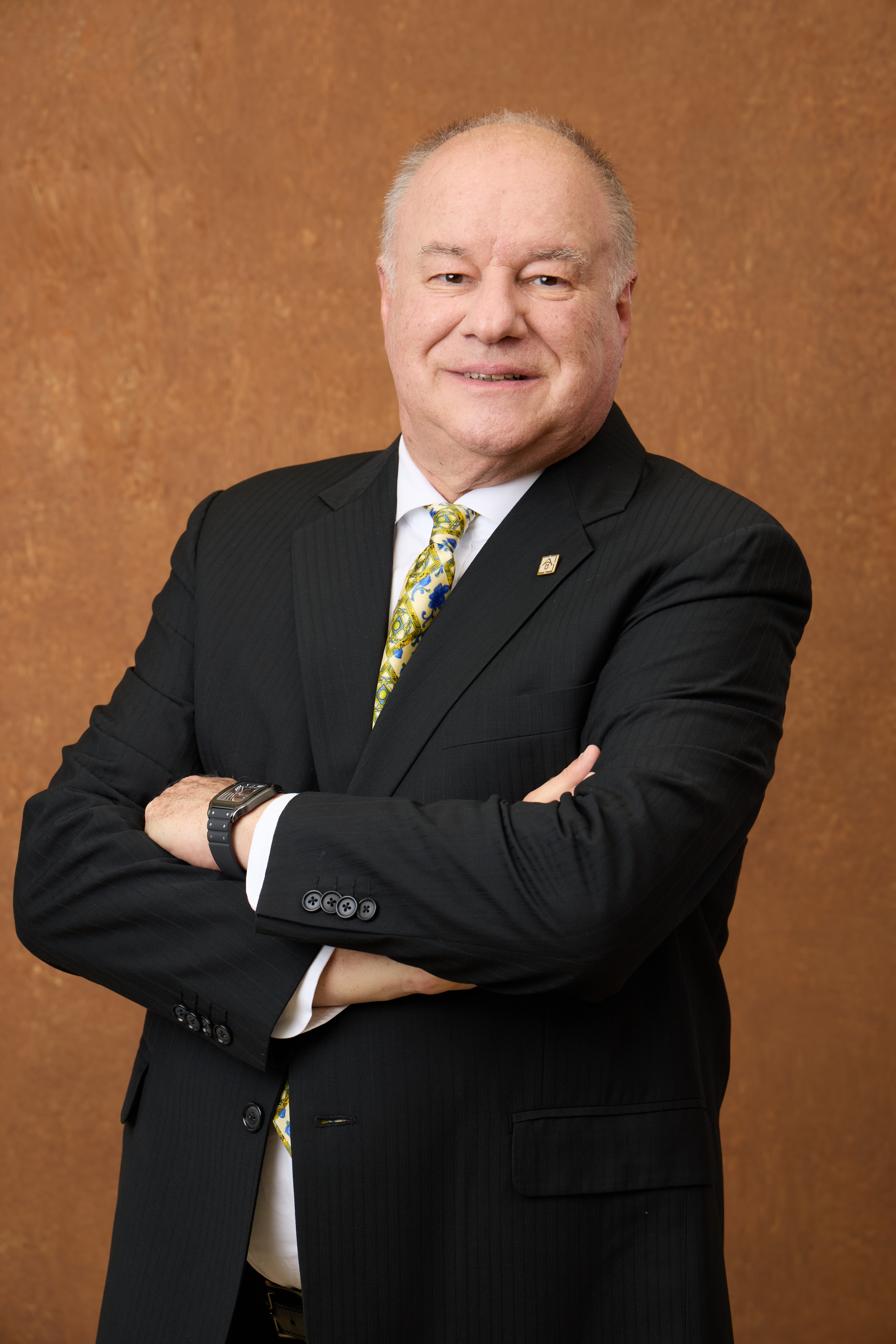
- Born: January 12, 1957 (age 69); Tours, France
- Occupations: Marketing scholar and Academic administrator,

Academic background
- Education: École Supérieure des Sciences Commerciales d’Angers; Sophia University; Universidad Autónoma de Madrid

Academic work
- Discipline: Marketing
- Institutions: China Europe International Business School; International Institute for Management Development

Dominique V. Turpin (born 12 January 1957) is a French and Swiss marketing scholar and academic administrator, currently serving as European President and Professor of Marketing at the China Europe International Business School (CEIBS). A professor in marketing strategy with a specialization in branding, he previously held the Dentsu Chair in Marketing and served as President, Dean, and Nestlé Professor at the International Institute for Management Development (IMD) in Switzerland between 2010 and 2016. Before joining IMD in 1986, Turpin worked in Japan as a representative of a French firm.

== Biography ==
Dominique V. Turpin was born in Tours, France, on 12 January 1957. He completed his baccalauréat in the sciences with distinction in 1976. He then studied from 1976 to 1980 at ESSCA (École Supérieure des Sciences Commerciales d’Angers) in France, during which time he spent an academic year at the Universidad Autónoma de Madrid (Spain) focusing on political marketing. He went on to earn his doctorate in economics in 1986 from Sophia University in Tokyo, Japan.

== Career ==
Turpin joined the faculty of IMEDE now IMD (International Institute for Management Development, Lausanne, Switzerland) in 1986. Between 1986 and 1991, he served successively as a post-doctoral fellow and assistant professor at IMEDE (which later merged into IMD), and assistant professor and as visiting professor at Keio Business School in Japan. In 1991, he was appointed full professor at IMD. He assumed leadership roles including Director of the MBA programme and the PED (Program for Executive Development). In July 2010, he became President (and dean) of IMD and held that position until December 2016. From 2016 to 2022, he was IMD’s Dean of External Relations.

In September 2022, Turpin was appointed President (European) and Professor of Marketing at China Europe International Business School (CEIBS), based in Shanghai (with campuses also in Beijing, Shenzhen, Zurich, and Accra). Turpin serves on the boards of several listed and unlisted companies and educational institutions.

He serves as Chairman of DAA Capital Partners, a Geneva-based private-equity firm focused on impactful trends. Turpin is also the founder and CEO of Turpin Services, a consulting company specializing on business in Japan and China.

During his tenure at IMD and beyond, Turpin directed flagship programs such as IMD’s MBA and the Orchestrating Winning Performance (OWP) programme. He has worked as consultant and educator for numerous multinational companies including Coca-Cola, Danone, Nestlé, Panasonic, Japan Tobacco International, Novo Nordisk and Philips.

At CEIBS, he helped shape the institution’s mission of globalising business education. Under its leadership, CEIBS’ Global Executive MBA (GEMBA) was ranked first worldwide by the Financial Times in 2025 after being ranked No. 2 in 2023, 2024 and again in 2026.

In 2000, Dominique Turpin was elected a life-long member of the International Academy of Management (IAM). He became its Vice-Chancellor in 2025.

== Research ==
Turpin’s research and teaching focus on brand management, marketing strategy and communications, customer centricity and Asian business strategy.

He has authored or co-authored more than 100 books, articles and case studies, with publications in outlets such as the Financial Times, European Business Forum, MIT Sloan Management Review, and others. He is also a highly-regarded case-writer. Dominique Turpin has been ranked on The Case Centre Top 50 Bestselling Case Authors list for six consecutive years (2019-2024). One of his latest publications: “The Essential Book of Business and Life Quotations” (Anthem Press) has become a reference book in its category.

== Personal ==
Dominique Turpin has three children. He speaks English, French, Japanese and Spanish.
