= China Europe International Business School =

Business school in Shanghai, China

Coordinates: 31.2008°N 121.4297°E

- 中欧国际工商学院
- Motto: 中国深度 全球广度
- Motto in English: China Depth, Global Breadth
- Type: Business school
- Established: 1994; 32 years ago
- Affiliations: Shanghai Jiao Tong University; European Commission; Ministry of Foreign Trade
- President: Wang Hong,
- Dean: Zhang Weijiong, Co-Dean Frank Bournois
- Postgraduates: 1,078
- Location: Shanghai
- Website: www.ceibs.edu

China Europe International Business School
- Traditional Chinese: 中歐國際工商學院
- Simplified Chinese: 中欧国际工商学院
Transcriptions
Standard Mandarin
- Hanyu Pinyin: Zhōng Ōu Guójì Gōngshāng Xuéyuàn

China Europe International Business School (CEIBS (/siːbz/ SEEBZ) Chinese: 中欧国际工商学院) is a business school headquartered in Pudong, Shanghai, China. CEIBS has campuses in Shanghai, Beijing, Shenzhen, Accra in Ghana, and Zurich in Switzerland.

Established under an agreement between the Chinese government and the European Commission in Shanghai in November 1994, CEIBS was the first business school in mainland China to offer a full-time MBA in China, an Executive MBA and a wide range of Executive Education programmes (e.g. full time MBA programme in English, part-time Global EMBA (GEMBA) programme in English). CEIBS follows the European model of business schools.

CEIBS was the first business school in Mainland China to be accredited by both EQUIS and AACSB.

== History ==
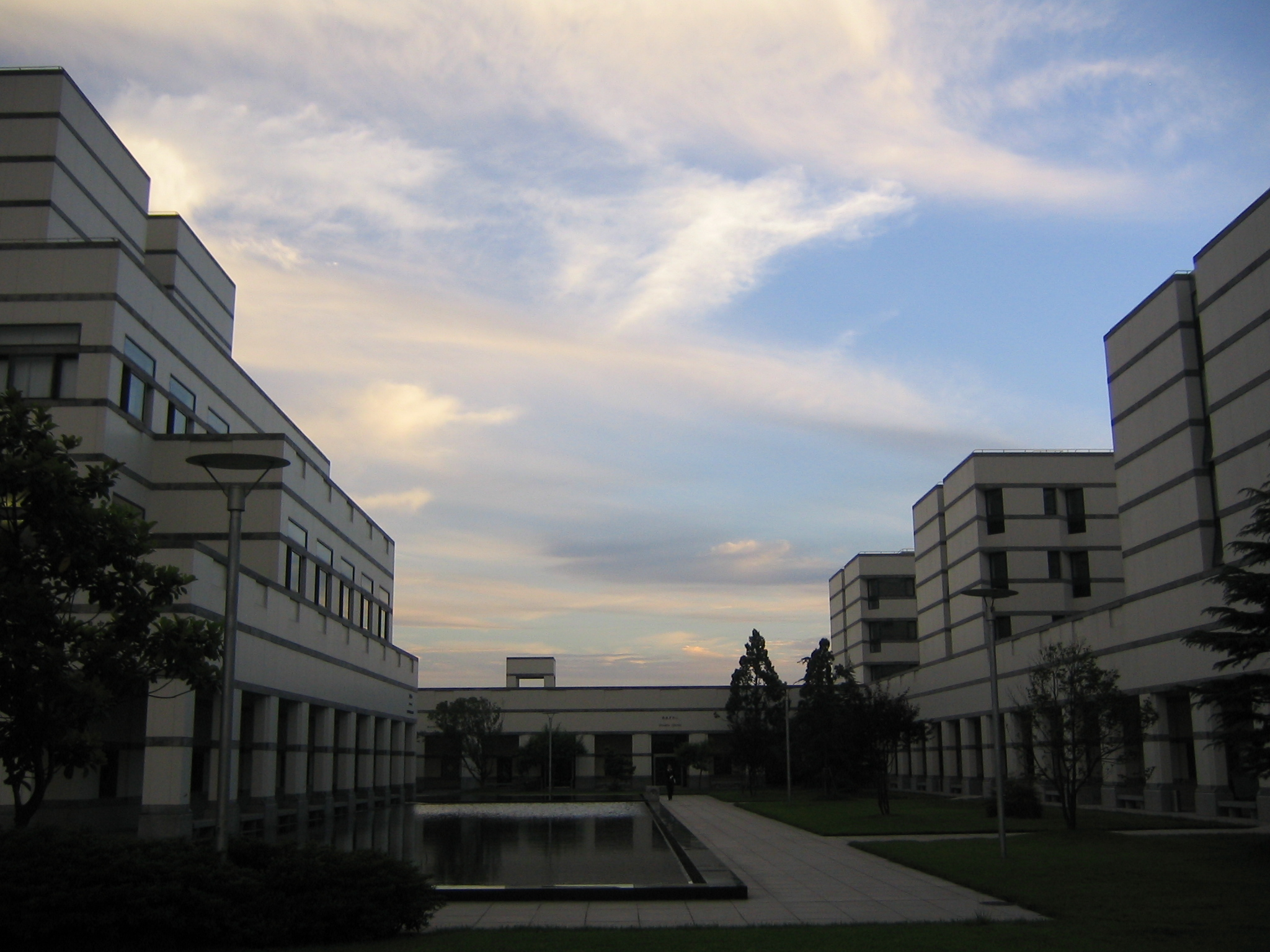
View of the water fountains and sidewalks between the library (L) and dormitories (R) of the CEIBS Shanghai campus

The school's predecessor, the China-EC Management Institute (CEMI), was launched in Beijing in 1984. After CEIBS was formally established in 1994 in collaboration with its partners European Foundation for Management Development and Shanghai Jiao Tong University. In 1994, CEIBS opened its main campus in Shanghai's Pudong district.

In May 2009, CEIBS started an EMBA programme in Ghana, being the first Asian business school to start such a programme in Africa. CEIBS was also the first Asian business school, and one of the very few around the globe, to become carbon neutral in 2011. In 2009, CEIBS became the first Chinese business school to make the world's Top 10 MBA ranking compiled by the FT.

In November 2015, CEIBS announced that it had acquired the Lorange Institute of Business of Zurich for 16.5 million Swiss francs, with plans to train over 200 Chinese managers per month.

=== The CEIBS Diaries ===
In June 2022, a 12-part series of posts detailing the negative experience of international students at CEIBS was published on Reddit by an account claiming to be a group of CEIBS MBA alumni.

The European President of CEIBS Dominique Turpin acknowledged the CEIBS Diaries but vowed the school would learn from its missteps.

== Campus ==
The main campus of CEIBS in Shanghai's Pudong district established in 1994 was designed by Henry N. Cobb and Ian Bader of Pei Cobb Freed & Partners and made CEIBS the first business school in mainland China with its own campus. In 2011, CEIBS began the 18-month construction of Phase 3 of the Shanghai campus which doubled its size to 7.5 million square meters.

CEIBS opened its Beijing campus on April 24, 2010, within Beijing's Zhonguangcun Software Park alongside the research centres of IBM, Oracle, Neusoft and more than 200 other leading technology companies. It effectively doubled the school's total number of classroom seats. Designed by the Spanish architectural firm IDOM, the Beijing campus hosts CEIBS EMBA programme and executive education courses. Each year, the CEIBS Beijing campus graduates almost 300 EMBA students and nearly 3,000 executive education participants. The campus is also a central meeting point for CEIBS alumni as Beijing is home to CEIBS' second-largest alumni chapter (after Shanghai).

The CEIBS Zurich Campus is in Horgen, on the shore of Lake Zurich, 18 km from the city centre. Campus buildings are connected by a futuristic-looking glass facade. Hosting participants from the MBA, EMBA, GEMBA and HEMBA programmes, as well as customised Executive Education programmes, the Zurich Campus serves as a satellite of CEIBS' main campus in China and as a bridge between Europe and China for the school. In 2019, a major expansion project doubled the size and capacity of the campus.

== Academics ==
80% of the non-Chinese students who graduate from China Europe International Business School establish residence and work in the Asia-Pacific region.

=== Programmes ===
- MBA (Full-time, English)
- Global Masters in Management (Dual-Degree Programme with ESCP, English)
- Finance MBA (Part-time, Mandarin)
- DBA (Taught in Switzerland, Mandarin)
- Global Executive MBA (Part-time, English)
- Executive Education
- PhD (Coordinated with Shanghai Jiaotong University)
- MBA/Master of Arts in Law and Diplomacy (Coordinated with Fletcher School of Law and Diplomacy at Tufts University)
- MBA/Master of Public Health (Coordinated with Johns Hopkins Bloomberg School of Public Health)
- MBA/Master of Management in Hospitality (Coordinated with Cornell University School of Hotel Administration)
- Executive MBA (Mandarin)

=== Rankings and Accreditation ===
Top-tier global rankings

The CEIBS Global EMBA (GEMBA) programme is ranked #1 worldwide by the Financial Times. The CEIBS MBA programme has ranked in the top 25 of the Financial Times' annual ranking for 20 consecutive years (2005-2024), including eight years as #1 in Asia. For more details, see below.

CEIBS MBA Programme

- No.1 in Asia, No. 21 globally amongst full-time MBA programmes in the Financial Times (2025)
- No.1 in Asia in Bloomberg Businessweek’s Best Business Schools (2021)
- No.1 in Asia amongst 2-year programmes outside the US in Forbes Magazine’s The Best Business Schools (2019)

CEIBS Global EMBA Programme

- No.1 worldwide in the Financial Times EMBA Ranking (2024)
- Previously in the top 20 worldwide for 14 consecutive years in the Financial Times EMBA Ranking (2010-2023)

Accreditation

In March 2004, CEIBS received European Quality Improvement System (EQUIS) accreditation, making it the first school in mainland China to receive this international accreditation. EQUIS is a renowned international system of quality assessment, improvement, and accreditation of higher education institutions in management and business administration. In 2007, 2012, 2017, and most recently in 2022, EQUIS awarded CElBS with a five-year renewal of its accreditation in recognition of the school's high standards.

In December 2008, CEIBS also received accreditation from the Association to Advance Collegiate Schools of Business (AACSB). Founded in 1916, AACSB International is the longest serving global accrediting body for business schools that offer undergraduate, master’s, and doctoral degrees in business and accounting. CEIBS now holds the distinction of having received accreditation from both the US and European standard accrediting bodies. In 2013, 2019, and again in 2024, CEIBS was re-certified as an accredited business school by the AACSB.

In addition, in 2002, the Academic Degree Committee of the State Council of China formally recognised CEIBS’ MBA degree.

== Administration ==
Person	Position
Wang Hong	President (September 2020–present)
Dominique Turpin	President (European) September 2022–present

In February 2011, former Harvard Business School professor John Quelch was appointed as vice president and dean of the business school. However, Quelch abruptly announced his resignation in November 2012.

February 17, 2023. Shanghai – Professor Frank Bournois has been appointed by the Board of Directors as Vice President and Dean, together with Co-Dean Professor Zhang Weijiong, effective April 1, 2023.

== Notable people ==
=== Faculty and staff ===
- Romano Prodi, board member
- Wu Jinglian, Honorary Professor
- Xu Xiaonian, Professor of Economics and Finance

=== Alumni ===
- Barbara Frances Ackah-Yensu, Justice of the Supreme Court of Ghana
- Chen Hao, Governor of Yunnan province
- Huang Nubo, Chairman, Beijing Zhongkun Investment Group
- Lan Yu, fashion designer
- Liu Qiangdong, Founder and President, JD.com
- Maymunah Kadiri, Nigerian mental health advocate
- Yang Lan, Co-founder, Sun TV
