= Master's degree (France) =

Academic degree in France

Diplôme National de Master
- A Master's degree from the University of Montpellier
- Acronym: Master
- Type: Master's degree
- Duration: Two years
- Prerequisites: Licentiate (degree)

In the French education system, a master's degree is both a national higher education diploma and a university degree. The Diplôme National de Master (in English: "National master's degree") is delivered by an academic institution, usually a university, two years after obtaining a Diplôme National de Licence or a Licence (French equivalent of a Bachelor's degree, worth 300 ECTS) or any other diploma or qualification equivalent to 300 ECTS recognized by the French government. It confers the degree of the same name. A grade de master (master's degree) may also be awarded with an Accredited Diploma by non-university institutions such as Grandes Écoles (elite engineering, business and specialized schools). The French Ministry of Higher Education has set up a web portal listing all the masters available in France: MonMaster.gouv.fr (in English: "MyMaster").

The name "master" is inspired by the term master's degree which is used by universities in English-speaking countries.

== History ==
During the existence of the Université de France, three degrees were established: the Baccalauréat, Licence and Doctorat. This gradation was forgotten over time.

Created in 1966, the prior maitrise's degree was awarded at the end of the second cycle of university graduate studies. Students holding a maitrise's degree could then pursue studies in a third cycle leading either to a one-year specialised higher education diploma (created in 1977), or at the doctorate level after one year of in-depth teaching and an introductory research internship leading to the "diplôme d'études approfondies" (created in 1964 in science and 1974 in other disciplines), usually followed by three years of research leading to the writing of a thesis.

Since 2005, the one-year master's degree and the one-year specialised degree have been replaced by the master's degree.

== National master's degree ==
The second cycle combines general education and vocational training, and should enable students to complete their knowledge, deepen their culture, and introduce them to scientific research. The training provided for the national master's degree includes theoretical, methodological, and applied teaching and necessarily includes one or more periods of professional experience (internships, contracts, civic service, etc.). It also includes an introduction to research, particularly the writing of a dissertation or other personal study work. The master's degree also validates the ability to master at least one foreign language.

In 2010, master's degrees designed to train teachers (primary and secondary school teachers, documentalist teachers and senior education advisers before taking the competitive examination) started making their appearance.

The master's degree is conferred by the French State to holders of the national master's degree. Certain specific degrees, such as the Master of Advanced Studies, the Diplôme d'Ingénieur, some health degrees (Medical education, Speech-language pathology, Physiotherapy…), may also lead to the French level of master.

== Fields and mentions ==
Since the 2005 reform, master's degrees have been classified into fields and mentions. The fields are chosen by each university, first freely (from 2003-2006) and then, from 2007, from a list of four national fields, which was fixed by a national training framework in 2014.

- Arts, humanities, and languages (Arts, lettres, langues)
- Law, economy, and management (Droit, économie, gestion)
- Human and social sciences (Sciences humaines et sociales)
- Science, technology, and health (Sciences, technologies, santé)

== Prices and cost of education in France ==
The French education system has tiers of costs. Most masters are free (or very limited fees: about 400 €/year for nationals, or 3000 €/year for foreigners), but some private schools (business schools in particular) are as expensive as their equivalents in the US or UK.
