= Master's degree in Europe =

Master's degrees in Europe are the second cycle of the Bologna process, following on from undergraduate bachelor's degrees and preceding third cycle doctorates. Master's degrees typically take two years to complete, although the number of years varies between countries, and correspond to 60 – 120 ECTS credits. Within the European Higher Education Area, representing almost all countries in Europe, master's degrees are referenced to the Framework of Qualifications for the European Higher Education Area and national qualifications frameworks.

== European Master's Market ==
Through the Bologna initiatives and support of the European Union, Europe is unifying and standardising especially the structure of their masters' programmes, making them more and more accessible to foreign students.

An often cited advantage of the European universities is an advantageous cost/quality ratio. In Europe, especially continental Europe, universities are heavily subsidized by their national governments. In Germany, Scandinavia or Eastern Europe for instance, most masters programmes have been traditionally totally free of charge. Recently, these governments are discussing and/or introducing tuition fees. E.g. Sweden started charging tuition for non-EU students in 2010 and Finland started charging non-EU/EEA students in 2017.

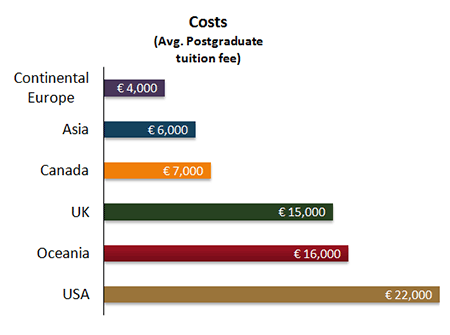

== Austria ==
In Austria, one obtains a bachelor's degree after 3 years of study and a master's degree after 2 more years of study. This is true for both the "research-oriented university" sector as well as the "university of applied sciences" sector which was established in the 1990s.

Medicine and dentistry pose an exception; these studies are not divided into bachelor's and master's degree, but take 6 years to complete and the degree obtained is called "Dr. med." (However this is not an equivalent to other doctoral degrees, as one writes a "diploma thesis" and not a "doctoral thesis" or "dissertation".)

In addition to traditional master's degrees, Austrian universities also offer the Master of Advanced Studies which is a non-consecutive continuing education degree. MAS programs tend to be interdisciplinary and tend to be focused toward meeting the needs of professionals rather than academics.

Before the Bologna process, the traditional Austrian equivalent to the master's degree was the Diplomstudium, leading to the title Diplom-Ingenieur (female title: Diplom-Ingenieurin)(Abbreviation: "Dipl.-Ing." or "DI") in engineering or Magister (female: Magistra)(Abbreviation: "Mag.") in almost every discipline. The Diplomstudium took about 4–6 years of study.

== Belgium ==
In Belgium, possessing a master's degree means that one has completed a higher education (usually university or college) programme of 4 or 5 years. Before the Bologna process most university degrees required 4 years of studies (leading to a licence), but some programmes required 5 years of study. An example in the field of education in business/management was the 5-year programme of "Handelsingenieur" (Dutch) or "Ingénieur de Gestion" (French) (English: "Commercial Engineer") with an important amount of mathematics and sciences, and which corresponds to an M.Sc. in Management. This degree co-existed with a graduate degree in business economics (4 years) named "Licentiaat in toegepaste economische wetenschappen" (Dutch) or "Licence en sciences économiques appliquées" (French) (English: "Licence in applied economics").

== Denmark ==
In Denmark, a Master's degree is awarded. The MA and MSc degrees and other master's degrees are distinguished. The MA and MSc.degrees are similar to a traditional Master's Programme, which are obtained by completing a higher education with a typical duration of five years on an accredited Danish university. Other master's degrees can be taken on an accredited Danish university, but these are made as adult (part-time) education such as the Master of IT (abbreviated M. IT) degree.

A large number of subdivisions exist, usually designating the area of education (e.g. cand.theol., cand.arch. and cand.jur.), though some have more vague definitions (cand.mag., cand.scient., cand.polyt., and cand.scient.techn., each of which encompass broad, overlapping areas of science).

The Bologna process has widely prompted master's degree education to consist of either 120 ECTS or 180 ECTS credit cycles, where one academic year corresponds to 60 ECTS-credits that are equivalent to 1,500–1,800 hours of study. In most cases, these will take 2 to 3 years respectively to complete.

- 1st cycle: typically 180–240 ECTS credits, usually awarding a bachelor's degree. The European Higher Education Area did not introduce the Bachelor with Honours programme, which allows graduates with a "BA hons" degree.
- 2nd cycle: typically 90–120 ECTS credits (a minimum of 60 on 2nd-cycle level). Usually awarding a master's degree.

== Finland ==
In Finland, the introduction of the Bologna Process has standardized most degrees into the European model. The master's degree takes 2–3 years (120 ECTS units) after the bachelor's degree. In English-speaking usage, the degree title is named after the particular faculty of study. In Finnish, the degree is called maisteri when granted by a traditional university. The term ylempi korkeakoulututkinto is used to denote master's degrees earned at a university of applied sciences. The university of applied sciences master's degrees may be 60, 90 or 120 ECTS in scope.

Medicine-related fields of medicine, dentistry, and veterinary medicine pose an exception to Bologna system. In medical fields, the Licenciate (Finnish: lisensiaatti, Swedish: licensiat) is an equivalent degree, the completion of which takes five (dentistry) or six years (medicine and veterinary), while the Bachelor of Medicine's title (Finnish: lääketieteen kandidaatti) is gained after second year of studies. In fields other than medicine, the Licentiate's degree is a post-graduate degree higher than Master's but lower than doctor's.

In Engineering, the higher degree is either diplomi-insinööri (Swedish: diplomingenjör, literally "Engineer with diploma") or arkkitehti (Swedish: arkitekt, English: Architect) although in international use MSc is used. In Pharmacy, the degree is proviisori (Swedish: provisor). All such degrees retaining their historical name are classified as master's degrees (ylempi korkeakoulututkinto) and in English usage, they are always translated as master's degrees. Some other master's degrees give the right to use the traditional title of the degree-holder. Most importantly, the degree of Master of Science in Economics and Business Administration gives the right to use the title of ekonomi, while the Masters of Science in Agriculture and Forestry may use the titles of metsänhoitaja (Forester) or agronomi (Agronomist) depending on their field of study.

== France ==
In France the Bologna Process has standardised most of the degrees into the three-cycle Bologna model, of which the master's degree is the second cycle. A master's degree takes 2 or 3 years (120 ECTS units) after the Licentiate. Many countries follow the French model (e.g. the Francophone regions in Switzerland, Belgium, Lebanon, Algeria, Morocco and Tunisia). The following are considered master's degrees:

- The master's diploma (diplôme de master) is the most common master's degree. It is awarded mainly by universities, although some grandes écoles also deliver master's diplomas.
- The Engineer's degree diploma is awarded by grandes écoles. Not all grandes écoles programs are accredited by the State.
- The Architect's degree.
- Some degrees from Schools of Fine Arts.
- Qualifications recognised at Level 1 (EQF Level 7) of the répertoire national des certifications professionnelles (national register of professional certificates).

France is also host to a number of private American-style universities like The American University of Paris or Schiller International University, which offer US-accredited master's degrees in Europe. Admission into these master's programs requires a completed American undergraduate degree or an equivalent French/European degree.

The French Ministry of Higher Education has set up a web portal listing all the masters available in France: Trouvermonmaster.gouv.fr

== Germany ==
Due to the EU-wide Bologna process, the traditional German academic degrees Diplom and Magister have mostly been replaced by the undergraduate Bachelor (3-4 year study programme) and postgraduate Master's degree (1-2 year study programme).

In Germany the Diplom (first degree after (usually) 4–6 years - from either a Universität (University), a Technische Hochschule or a Kunsthochschule with university status) and the Magister had traditionally been equivalated to the master's degree, the Magister being a degree after the study of two or three subjects (one main and one or two subsidiary subjects), as common in Humanities or Liberal Arts, whereas the Diplom is awarded after the study of one subject, commonly found in Natural Sciences, Social Sciences, Formal sciences and some Applied Sciences. The Fachhochschulen or Universities of Applied Sciences conferred the Diplom (FH), whose length of study is between the bachelor's and master's degree.

Under the harmonised system there is no legal academic difference between the bachelor's and master's degrees conferred by the Fachhochschulen and Universitäten.

The German Meister qualification for a master craftsman is neither a degree nor is it comparable to the academic master's degree. It, however, qualifies the holder to study at a university or Fachhochschule, whether the Meister holds the regular entry qualification (Abitur or Fachhochschulreife) or not.

== Ireland ==
Postgraduate master's degrees in Ireland can either be taught degrees involving lectures, examination and a short dissertation, or research degrees. An exception to this is Trinity College Dublin, where the MA is an undergraduate degree awarded 21 terms after matriculation as at Oxford and Cambridge.

In most established 3rd level institutes which award post graduate qualifications, a distinction is made between an MA qualification and an MPhil qualification. An MA is a combination of taught (classroom) and research-based modules, whilst an MPhil is composed exclusively of research-based learning.

The Magister in Arte Ingeniaria (MAI), literally meaning 'Master in the Art of Engineering', is awarded by Trinity College Dublin, and is more usually referred to as Master of Engineering. It was, historically, the engineering master's degree taken by the university's BAI graduates. Today the more common engineering master's degree at Trinity College Dublin is the MSc

A Master of Business Studies (MBS) refers to a qualification in the degree of master that can be obtained by students of recognized universities and colleges who complete the relevant approved programmes of study, pass the prescribed examinations, and fulfil all other prescribed conditions.

The Pontifical University St. Patrick's College, Maynooth, offer a Masters in Theology (MTh) and Masters in Liturgical Music (MLM) the Church of Ireland Theological Institute offers a Masters in Theology (MTh) programme.

University College Cork and Mary Immaculate College, Limerick offer a Master of Education (M.Ed), also the Mater Dei Institute now at St. Patricks Campus, Dublin City University had a Masters in Religious Education (MREd), now more commonly awarded as an MA. The Christian Leadership in Education Office (CLEO), in Cork, runs an MEd accredited by the University of Hull

The other universities in Ireland usually award a MEngSc, M.E., MEng or MSc for their postgraduate master's degree in engineering.

== Italy ==
The old university system (Vecchio Ordinamento) consisted in a unique course, extended from four to five years or maximum of six (only Medicine), with a variable period (six-twelve months usually) for the thesis work. After the thesis discussion, students got the Master's Degree, simply called Laurea.

This system was reformed in 1999/2000 to comply to the Bologna process directives. The new university system (Nuovo Ordinamento) includes two levels of degrees: a three-year Bachelor's degree, called Laurea di Primo Livello or just Laurea (e.g. Laurea di Primo Livello in Ingegneria Elettronica is Bachelor of Science in Electronic Engineering) and a two-year course of specialization, leading to a master's degree called Laurea di Secondo Livello, Laurea Magistrale (e.g. Laurea Specialistica in Ingegneria Elettronica is Masters of Science in Electronic Engineering). Both degrees include a thesis work with final discussion.

A student can apply for the PhD level course, called Dottorato di Ricerca, only after getting a Master's degree.

Medicine and some other school ("Facoltà"), notably Law, have adopted the reformed system only partially, keeping the previous unique course. Medicine is therefore still a six-year course followed, possibly, by the specialization, requiring from three to five years more.

However, these Facoltà also have other courses organized according to the new system (e.g., Tecniche di radiologia medica for Medicine, Consulente del lavoro for Law)

== Netherlands ==
In 2002, the Dutch degree system was changed to abide by international standards. This process was complicated by the fact that the Dutch higher education system has two separate branches, Hoger Beroeps Onderwijs (HBO, which indicates College or "University of Professional Education" level), and Wetenschappelijk Onderwijs (WO, which indicates University level). HBO level education focuses more on practical and professional education while WO is academic and scientific.

Before the Bachelor/Master system was introduced, HBO graduates received the title baccalaureus (with the corresponding pre-nominal abbreviation "bc."), which was rarely used. On the other hand, the HBO graduates with an engineering degree used the degree ingenieur, with pre-nominal abbreviation "ing.", which was (and still is) used quite commonly. WO degrees consisted of several different titles, such as doctorandus (pre-nominal abbreviated to drs., corresponds to MA or MSc), ingenieur (ir. for WO level, corresponds to MSc) and meester in de rechten (mr., corresponds to LLM) These former titles are no longer granted (although they are still used, protected, and interchangeable with MA and MSc titles). The title of doctor (dr., corresponding to the PhD degree) is still awarded.

Prior to the education reform, a single program leading to the doctorandus, ingenieur or meester degree was in effect, which comprised the same course load as the Bachelor and Master programs put together. Those who had already started the doctorandus, ingenieur or meester program could, upon completing it, opt for the old degree (before their name), or simply use the master's degree (behind their name) in accordance with the new standard. Since these graduates do not have a separate bachelor's degree (which is in fact – in retrospect – incorporated into the program), the master's degree is their first academic degree.

In the new system, completed college (HBO) degrees are equivalent to a bachelor's degree and are abbreviated to "B" with a subject suffix. Universities (WO) grant a bachelor's degree for the general portion of the curriculum. This degree is a "Bachelor of Science" or "Bachelor of Arts" with the appropriate suffix.

Before one is admitted to a Master's program, one must have obtained a bachelor's degree in the same field of study at the same level. This means that someone with a HBO Bachelor's degree can normally not start directly with a WO Master, their scientific deficiencies are bridged in a half-year or full year program after which they can continue into the WO Master program. There might also be additional requirements such as a certain higher than average GPA, sometimes it's possible to complete the bridging program parallel to the HBO Bachelor. Note that completing this program does not grant the student a WO Bachelor's degree but merely entrance to the Master and that some two year WO Masters allow HBO Bachelor's degree holders in directly.

All fully completed curricula in the Netherlands are equivalent to master's degrees with the addition of a "of Science" or "of Arts" to distinguish them from HBO Master's degrees, which until 2014 were simply known as Master. After 2014 "of Science" and "of Arts" are also granted to HBO masters. WO Master's degrees focus on specialization in a sub-area of the general bachelor's degree subject and typically take 1 year except for research masters, engineering studies and medical school where the Master takes 2, 2 and 3 years, respectively.

HBO Master's are usually started only after several years of work and are similarly focused on specialization. The title is signified by the abbreviation M and therefore an MBA would indicate a HBO Master's degree in business administration, but use of the MBA title is protected and it can only be granted by accredited schools.

== Norway ==
As a result of the Bologna-process and the Quality reform, the degree system of Norwegian higher education consists of the two main levels Bachelor's degree and Master's degree. A Bachelor's degree at a Norwegian university/university college is equivalent to an undergraduate degree and takes three years (with the exception of the teaching courses, where a bachelor's degree lasts for four years). The master's degrees are either fully integrated five-year programmes (admission does not require undergraduate degree) leading up to a graduate degree, or two-year courses at graduate level which require an already completed undergraduate degree. Following the graduate level, education is given at the doctoral level, usually through a four-year research fellowship leading to a PhD.

Before the implementation of this system, various titles were given in accordance with the field of study and the length of the course. For instance, a three-year undergraduate degree in engineering would give the title "høgskoleingeniør" (Bachelor's degree), and a 4.5 to 5 year graduate degree in engineering would give the title "sivilingeniør" (Master's degree). That being said, these titles are still very common and are, although formally abolished, degrees granted earlier are still being used, also by academic personnel.

== Poland ==
Currently there are two models of higher education in Poland.

In the traditional model, a master's degree is awarded after completion of a university curriculum — a 5-year programme in science courses at a university or other similar institution, with a project in the final year called magisterium (it can be translated as a Master of Arts or a Master of Science thesis) that often requires carrying out research in a given field. An MA degree is called a magister (abbreviated mgr) except for medical education, where it is called a lekarz (this gives the holder the right to use the title of physician and surgeon), a lekarz weterynarii in the veterinary field and a dentysta in field of dentistry. Universities of technology usually give the title of magister inżynier (abbreviated mgr inż.) corresponding to an MSc Eng degree.

More and more institutions introduce another model, which as of 2005 is still less popular. In this model, following the Bologna process directives, higher education is split into a 3 to 4-year Bachelor programme ending with a title of licencjat (non-technical) or inżynier (technical fields), and a 2-year programme (uzupełniające studia magisterskie) giving the title of magister or magister inżynier. Nevertheless, even in these institutions, it is often possible to bridge the Bachelor education directly into the Master programme, without formally obtaining the licencjat degree, thus shortening the time needed for completing the education slightly.

Depending on field and school, the timing may be slightly different.

== Portugal ==
=== Prior to the Bologna Process ===
Prior to the full implementation of the Bologna Process in July 2007 degrees in Portugal could be divided between Bacharelato (three years), Licenciatura (five years), Mestrado (Licenciatura + 2–3 years of postgraduate studies) and doutoramento (Mestrado + 4–6 years of postgraduate studies).

=== After the Bologna Process ===
With the full implementation of the Bologna process in July 2007, a Licenciatura (3 years) with the criteria for the first cycle and a Mestrado ('Licenciatura' + 2 years) in line with the criteria for the second cycle. There are other postgraduate titles after some of these cycles.

== Spain ==
=== Prior to the Bologna Process ===
Traditionally Spanish university studies comprised one single five years degree called "Licenciatura". These studies were informally divided into a three years module with core subjects (under the name of "Diplomatura") and a two years module meant for in depth studies on related fields. A similar division occurred in Technical studies, with a three years core module followed by another three years higher module.

=== After the Bologna Process ===
After Bologna, the studies are divided into a Bachelor ("Grado") and a Masters, with a 4 + 1 structure.

== Sweden ==
=== Prior to the Bologna Process ===
Prior to the full implementation of the Bologna Process in July 2007 degrees in Sweden could be divided between kandidat (three years), magister (four years), licentiat (magister + 2–3 years of postgraduate studies) and doktor (magister + 4–5 years of postgraduate studies). The kandidat degrees were in some specific instances, law and theology to name a few, longer than three years.

==== Engineering ====
In engineering disciplines MSc was called civilingenjör, a four-and-a-half-year academic program concluded with a thesis. There was no direct equivalent to a B.Sc, however, a three-year engineering degree with a more practical focus called högskoleingenjör was close.

=== After the Bologna Process ===
With the full implementation of the Bologna process in July 2007, a kandidat (3 years) and a master (five years) was introduced in line with the criteria for the second cycle. The magister will still exist alongside the new master, but is expected to be largely neglected in favour of the new, internationally recognized degree. The MSc of engineering, civilingenjör, was expanded to five years and a new BSc was introduced to coexist with the unaltered högskoleingenjör.

== United Kingdom ==
Master's degrees in the UK may be taught or research degrees, and include integrated master's degrees where a final year is added to a bachelor's degree programme to raise it to master's level. All of these are second-cycle qualifications within the Bologna Process. For historical reasons, MAs at the ancient universities of Scotland are bachelor's-level undergraduate qualifications, while the Oxbridge MA, awarded to BA graduates of Oxford and Cambridge universities without further study, is not considered an academic qualification.

== Other approaches ==
As indicated above, even though higher education systems in Europe try to comply with the Bologna process, the process is not yet fully accomplished. Differences in methodology and curricula are still widely different in some cases. To mitigate this, several initiatives and approaches are currently tried, some of them with the support of the European Union institutions. Either in partnership or as private consortia, networks of universities in different countries are trying to work out shared curricula and adopt similar methodologies. In niche educational areas like translation and interpreting this has proved successful and the networks have become functional, i.e. European Master's in Translation and the European Master's in Conference Interpreting. While these are not mainstream developments in these networks of universities, a similar master's degree certificate is offered for a given field, and the network/consortium collectively guarantees that these degrees have a high level of convergence.
