= Parcoursup =

Web portal for university admissions in France

- Logo for Parcoursup.

- Screenshot of Parcoursup on June 2026.
- Website type: Academic portal
- Available in: French
- Country of origin: France
- Owner: Minister of Higher Education, Research and Innovation (France)
- Website: www.parcoursup.fr
- Advertising: no
- Commercial: no
- Registration: Optional
- Launched: 15 January 2018; 8 years ago
- Current status: active

Parcoursup is a web portal designed by the French Ministry of Education and the French Ministry of Higher Education, Research and Innovation, which manages admissions to French universities and other higher education institutions and processes the applications of high school graduates. The portal was released in 2018, and 666,000 candidates registered. In 2022, the site received applications from 626,653 students. In 2020, 17,123 undergraduate programmes are offered by Parcoursup.

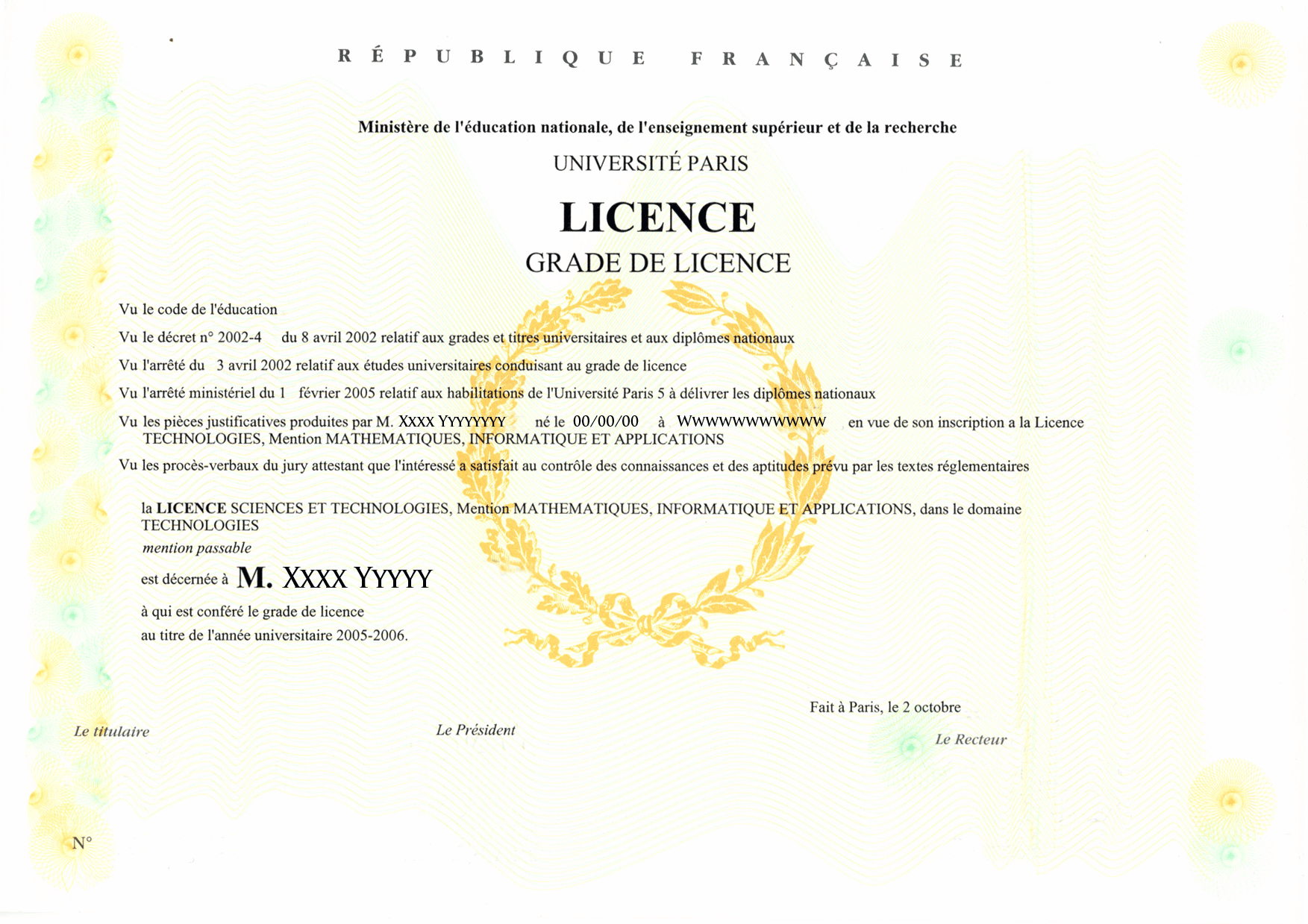
Copy of French licence's diploma

Parcoursup used to replace a previous Web platform (APB Admission Post-Bac, launched in 2009), which replaced the old system of randomly drawing students with one that allows examination of each student's files. However, Parcoursup has been criticised for creating anxiety among students, and being opaque because each university uses its own criteria to decide which students will be admitted. It has also been blamed for the amount of work it generates within universities. Parcoursup allows each student to make between 1 to 10 school choices with as many as 20 secondary choices. Thus, undergraduate programs receive far more applications than they used to and some universities have to consider more than 100,000 student applications.

This has led to tensions within French universities, and contributed to a controversy between left- and right-wing parties. In April 2024, the high administrative court examined two texts, a decree and an order, which modified the terms of application on the platform and a certain number of quotas for non-European students; these measures have been deemed discriminatory and xenophobic by student organizations.
