= Bachelor of Journalism =

Bachelor's degree

The Bachelor of Journalism (B.J.) degree is a degree awarded at some universities to students who have studied journalism in a three or four year undergraduate program. In the United States, some schools that do not award the B.J. degree instead confer a Bachelor of Arts, Journalism (B.A.J.), Bachelor of Arts in Journalism and Mass Communication (B.A.J.M.C.) or Bachelor of Science, Journalism (BSJ) that is often part of or in conjunction with a course of study in mass communication. Yet another epithetological version of the degree, conferred by The Henry W. Grady College of Journalism and Mass Communication at the University of Georgia, is the A.B.J. degree, the Latin equivalent of the B.J./B.A.J.

The Accrediting Council on Education in Journalism and Mass Communication at the University of Kansas accredits university level journalism programs in the United States. There are currently 109 such accredited programs in 40 states.

== India ==
In India, Bachelor of Journalism is of 3 years. Journalism courses in India are known by various names like B.J. (Bachelor of Journalism), B.J. (Hons) (Bachelor of Journalism (Honours)), B.C.J. (Bachelor of Communication and Journalism), B.M.M. (Bachelor of Mass Media), B.A. - J.M.C (Bachelor of Arts in Journalism and Mass Communication), B.A.- Mass Communication (Bachelor of Arts in Mass Communication). Employability prospects vary by the reputation of the institute and course.

== South Africa ==
In South Africa, Rhodes University offers the primary accomplishment for Journalism students. While other universities and colleges offer diplomas, or B.A. degrees with media studies as a major, Rhodes University combines practical knowledge with theoretical frameworks to compound a highly respected degree. Coupled with an intense selection process, only just over 120 students are permitted to 2nd Year, with even less permitted to the 4th Year Specialisation Course. Without this 4th Year Course, graduates depart with a 3 Year B.A. Degree, with Journalism and Media Studies as one of their majors.

== France ==
In France, the programs of the most prestigious journalism schools are accredited by a commission representing the profession (the CPNEJ). Almost all of them offer only a Master of Journalism (M.J.). Only four of them offer a Bachelor of Journalism degree, two of which are vocational and accredited:

- Lannion Information and Mass Communication Department, University of Rennes
- School of Journalism, University of the French Riviera

Two other schools that offer an accredited Master of Journalism degree (CFJ and ESJ) also offer a Bachelor of Journalism degree (not accredited) but which prepares students for the Master of Journalism entrance exam:

- W School Bachelor of Journalism, Centre de Formation des Journalistes, Panthéon-Assas University
- ESJ Academy Bachelor, Lille Graduate School of Journalism (ESJ Lille), University of Lille

There are also other Bachelor of Journalism (not accredited) offered by public or private universities or colleges:
