= School of Journalism and Communication =

A School of Journalism and (Mass) Communication may refer any number of higher level academic institutions which combine the fields of journalism and communication or mass communication. The title may refer to:

== United States ==
- A.Q. Miller School of Journalism and Mass Communications
- Gaylord College of Journalism and Mass Communication
- Henry W. Grady College of Journalism and Mass Communication
- University of Minnesota School of Journalism and Mass Communication
- University of North Carolina at Chapel Hill School of Journalism and Mass Communication
- University of Oregon School of Journalism and Communication
- University of Wisconsin–Madison School of Journalism & Mass Communication
- Walter Cronkite School of Journalism and Mass Communication

== Philippines ==
- Asian Institute of Journalism and Communication, Philippines

== France ==
- W School of Journalism and Communication, Paris
