= W School of Journalism and Communication =

Unit of Assas University in Paris, France

W School of Journalism and Communication, Paris-Panthéon-Assas University
- École W, Université Paris-Panthéon-Assass
- Other name: W
- Motto: L'École des 5 W
- Motto in English: The Five Ws school
- Type: Private university college, within a public–private partnership university
- Established: 2016
- Parent institution: Paris-Panthéon-Assas University
- Affiliations: CFJ, Paris-Panthéon-Assas University, Cumulus Association, Google News Initiative University Network, Skolae Group
- President: Jean-Bernard Schmidt
- Students: 400
- Undergraduates: 250
- Postgraduates: 150
- Location: Paris, Rennes, Tours, Toulon, Toulouse; 48.8497075°N 2.3836537°E
- Campus: urban
- Website: www.ecolew.com

The W School of Journalism and Mass Communication, or commonly the École W, is a French private constituent college of Paris-Panthéon-Assas University, created by the CFJ Graduate School of Journalism, the university's prestigious journalism school, in 2016 and located in Paris, France. The university college aims to train students to create content for journalism, communication and the arts industry, inspired by the Danish alternative business school Kaospilot.

The W School offers preparation for the French competitive entrance exams to journalism graduate schools, combined with multi-disciplinary, generalist training in the humanities and social sciences (arts, photography, scriptwriting, management, etc.) and in information and communication sciences (journalism, corporate communication, communication and graphic industries, etc.). The school's main campus is in the 12th arrondissement of Paris, on the same campus as its ‘’older‘’ sister school, the CFJ. The W School has secondary campuses in Rennes, Tours, Toulouse, and Toulon.

The school also offers partnership courses leading to national diplomas: a bachelor's degree in science journalism with the Sorbonne Faculty of Science and Engineering, a double International BBA diploma with EDHEC Business School and a master's degree in documentary and fiction film with the Panthéon-Assas University and the French National Audiovisual Institute (INA). The school is also a member, along with the CFJ, of the Information and Networks department of Paris-Panthéon-Assas University, the Google News Initiative University Network of journalism schools and the Cumulus Association, an international alliance of art, design and media universities.

In 2025, the French Higher Council for Evaluation of Research and Higher Education (HCERES) reported a “satisfactory” employment rate of 85%.

== History ==
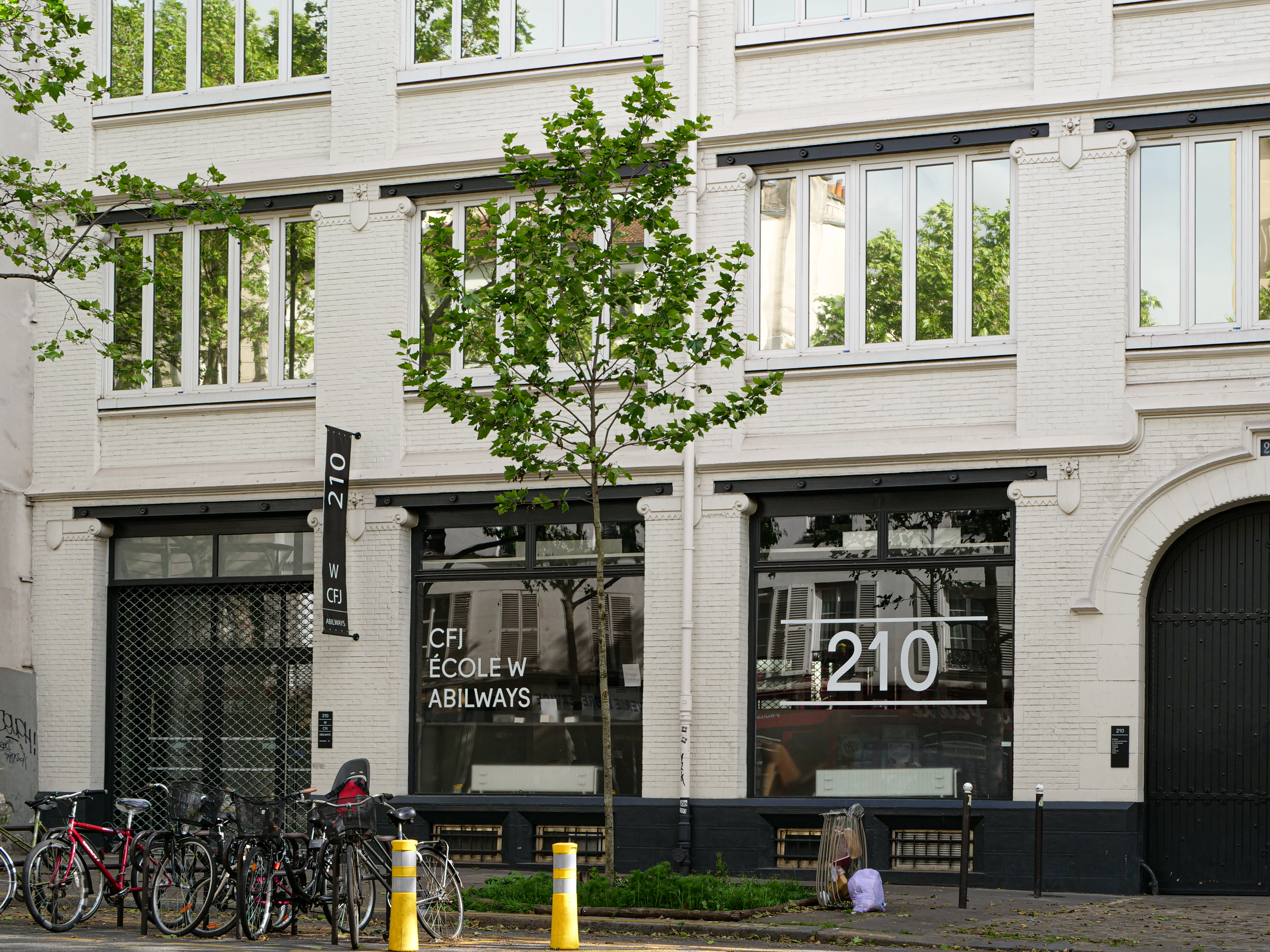
Entrance to the CFJ and W School campus building at 210 rue du Faubourg Saint Antoine in Paris, in May 2021.

On 12 January 2016, following in the footsteps of the Académie de École supérieure de journalisme de Lille in 2014, the CFJ announced the creation of W, a bachelor's degree course enabling students to learn about careers in journalism, communication, marketing and digital creation and to prepare for the French competitive exams for journalism schools.

On 28 June 2019, EDHEC Business School and W School announced the signing of a double degree agreement to W and BBA EDHEC students. W students will be able to complete their bachelor's degree with a fourth year in the International Business Track in English at BBA EDHEC. BBA EDHEC students, on the other hand, will be able to replace their third year by enrolling in a W course, including journalism, documentary and fiction, or marketing and digital communication.

On 13 April 2021, the French business school Audencia and École W launched a preparatory course for the French journalism school entrance exams in Nantes, with plans to create a double master's degree by the start of the 2022 academic year.

On 19 June 2021, the University of Paris-II Panthéon Assas announced a plan to transform its structure into an experimental one, based on a public-private partnership, which would bring together the Institut supérieur d'interprétation et de traduction (ISIT), the École française d'électronique et d'informatique (EFREI), the Centre de formation des journalistes (CFJ) and the École W as constituent schools of the university, and the IRSEM as a partner institute. The new university is created on 1 January 2022.

In April 2024, the French National Institute of Sport, Expertise, and Performance (INSEP) and the W School announced the launch at the start of the 2024 academic year of a new bachelor's degree course in journalism and communication, open to high-level sportsmen and women (SHN) and non-SHN, to replace the ‘Sportcom’ course created by the CFJ in 1987.

On 21 January 2025, the French Higher Council for Evaluation of Research and Higher Education (HCERES) published its evaluation report on Paris-Panthéon-Assas University and its constituent colleges, such as W School. The authority praised the W School's “satisfactory” graduate employment rate of 85%, a “steady increase” in enrollment since 2022, the establishment of a master's degree (Diplôme National de Master) with the French Press Institute, another component of the university, and a bachelor's degree (Diplôme National de Licence) with Sorbonne University, as well as partnerships “with renowned institutions: EM Lyon Business School, EDHEC Business School, and HEC Paris.” On the other hand, it points to research potential that “remains limited” but takes into account the desire of École W to build “a team of teacher-researchers,” particularly in “AI and alternative teaching methods.”

== Academic programs ==
The W School of the CFJ delivers a bachelor's degree in digital marketing, mass communication and journalism and a Titre of journalist, recognized by the French State and registered in the Répertoire national des certifications professionnelles, which takes place over three years and offers five specializations:

- the "Journalism, Documentary and Fiction" program: basic writing techniques, storytelling and screenplays, English, new writing, image and sound techniques;
- the "Marketing and Digital Communication" program: marketing, strategy and business issues, communication, digital strategy, Business English with an accredited co-diploma opportunities with EDHEC and Emlyon Business School;
- the "Sports Journalism" or "Sports Communication and Marketing" program: sports journalism, sports marketing, e-sport issues, sports events, sports law, creation, gaming, sports psychology, in partnership with the Institut National du Sport, de l'Expertise et de la Performance (INSEP). It replaces the CFJ's 'Sportcom' course, launched in 1987;

The W School also delivers:

- a co-diploma bachelor's degree (licence) in 'Scientific Journalism' with the Sorbonne Faculty of Science and Engineering since 2019, and the access to this programme is by selection by the school and the university, through the French national platform for access to the university Parcoursup;
- a co-diploma master's degree in 'Documentary and Fiction Film' with Paris-Panthéon-Assas University and the Institut National de l'Audiovisuel (INA);
- a Brevet de technicien supérieur diploma in 'Communications Project Management Studies', also accessible on the national Parcoursup platform, since 2024.

The W School have academic partnerships with the French business schools and Grande École HEC Paris, EM Lyon Business School and EDHEC Business School.

== Accreditation ==
The W School of Journalism and Communication is a private college part of the Paris-Panthéon-Assas University, a public collegiate university accredited by the French Ministry of Higher Education and Research and member of the Chancellery of the Universities of Paris. It is registered in the French Ministry of Employment's National Register of Professional Certifications (RNCP) at level 6 (licence, bachelor's degree) and 7 (master's degree). The bachelor's degree (in Science Journalism) and master's degree (in Documentary Film) programmes offered in partnership with Sorbonne University and Paris-Panthéon-Assas University are delivered by these universities and accredited by the French Ministry of Higher Education.
