= Lowell Jack =

American politician

Lowell Edward Jack (August 14, 1925 – August 29, 2010) was a longtime resident and historian of Manhattan, Kansas. He was the general manager of KMAN (1350 AM) from 1954 to his retirement in 1989. He was also a city commissioner, mayor and president of the chamber of commerce in Manhattan.

Jack also published six historical calendars of Manhattan, and two historical books about Manhattan and its people. He worked to provide a temporary studio for KSDB after the fire at Nichols Gym.
