= Centre de formation des journalistes =

French Grande Ecole of Journalism, part of the Assas University, in Paris, France

Coordinates: 48.84968°N 2.38621°E

CFJ, Paris-Panthéon-Assas University
- Centre de formation des journalistes
- Other name: École CFJ
- Motto: Former des journalistes créatifs, libres, dotés de valeurs fortes.
- Motto in English: Train creative, free journalists with strong values.
- Type: Private Grande Ecole, within a public-private partnership university
- Established: 1946
- Parent institution: Paris-Panthéon-Assas University
- Accreditation: French Government; CPNEJ; CGE
- Affiliations: Paris-Panthéon-Assas University, University of Paris 1 Pantheon-Sorbonne, Conférence des grandes écoles, Sorbonne Université, Hesam University, Cumulus Association
- President: Stéphanie Lebrun
- Students: 350
- Undergraduates: 250 (CFJ's W Diploma)
- Postgraduates: 100 (CFJ Diploma)
- Location: Faubourg Saint-Antoine, Paris, France; Euronews HQ, Lyon, France
- Campus: urban
- Website: www.cfjparis.com

The Centre de formation des journalistes (in English: Institute for the Training of Journalists) or CFJ Graduate School of Journalism is a private non-profit Grande École and the Paris-Panthéon-Assas University graduate school of journalism, as part of a public-private partnership, located in Paris and Lyon, France.

The CFJ is a member of the Conférence des Grandes écoles. The CFJ is recognized by the French government and by the profession of journalists. The CFJ diploma is organized with the University of Paris 1 Pantheon-Sorbonne. Since September 2020, Sorbonne University and the CFJ's W School have been offering a double degree in "Science and journalism" which is equivalent to a BSc degree in journalism. In Lyon, CFJ courses are taught at the world headquarters of the pan-European television channel Euronews.

Often considered as "the ENA of journalists", like the ESJ of Lille, the CFJ has trained a large number of great journalists (Bernard Pivot, David Pujadas, Florence Aubenas, Pierre Lescure ...), and attracts each year nearly a thousand candidates for around fifty places.

== History ==
The CFJ was founded the day after the Liberation, on 11 July 1946, by Philippe Viannay and Jacques Richet, both members of the resistance group "Défense de la France".

The school was recognized by the French State as an establishment of higher technical education on 25 January 1962.

In 1969, it created the Centre de perfectionnement des journalistes (CPJ), which offered professional training for journalists. In 1972, the CFJ and the CPJ joined forces within the CFPJ (Centre de formation et de perfectionnement des journalistes).

Following a financial crisis, in 1998, the school had to restructure. At the initiative of Claire Richet, Bernard Pivot and Pierre Lescure, former students created the "CFJ-Demain" association to find financing solutions that would allow the school to escape liquidation. The justice system granted it the takeover of the CFPJ in 1999. Despite the increase in tuition fees, the situation remained precarious: in 2002, the CFPJ group was once again in bankruptcy.

In July 2003, the CFPJ group, the structure into which the CFJ's activities fit, was taken over by the EFE training group, which became Abilways in 2012.

The CFJ has been managed by the association École CFJ (non-profit) since 28 July 2003.

The CFJ is one of the 14 Journalism schools recognized by the profession according to the objective list given by the Office national d'information sur les enseignements et les professions (ONISEP). There is no official ranking of journalism schools recognized by the profession as indicated by the ONISEP in its list. The documentary bases of specialized bodies refrain from making value judgments.

Since 2013, the CFJ is an affiliated member of Hautes Écoles Sorbonne Arts et Métiers University (HESAM University).

On 12 January 2016, the CFJ and the Abilways Group announced the creation of W School, a three-year undergraduate program that will allow students to learn about the information, communication and digital creation professions and to prepare for journalism school competitions.

In October 2016, the CFJ leaves its historic premises at 35 rue du Louvre in Paris to move into a 1,700 m2 building belonging to the Abilways Group, at 210 rue du Faubourg Saint-Antoine in the 12th arrondissement of Paris.

In September 2017, the CFJ creates a preparation for the journalism school competitions in partnership with its post-baccalaureate training, the W School.

The CFJ Paris has been recognized as a private higher education institution of general interest since 16 January 2020.

On 23 April 2018, the CFJ-W group becomes an associate member of the Cumulus International Association of Universities and Colleges of Art, Design and Media.

On 16 January 2020, the CFJ obtains the qualification of "Établissement d'enseignement supérieur privé d'intérêt général" (EESPIG) by publication in the Official Bulletin of the Ministry of Higher Education, Research and Innovation.

On 12 May 2021, the CFJ, in partnership with the pan-European channel Euronews, is announcing the creation in Lyon of a new Masters-level apprenticeship course entitled 'Local/Global'.

== Academic programs ==
The school, cited in the Convention collective nationale de travail des journalistes, has adapted to the technical changes in the media world. In 1984, it created the first training course for image reporters (JRI) and in 2000, the first French training course in multimedia journalism.

In 2013, the CFJ inaugurated in its premises the first Newsroom dedicated to teaching journalism, which won the "Explore" prize in May 201618 and in May 2017. The school is developing specific academic and practical courses in this framework, open to students from its two classes.

The pedagogical responsibility for the different specializations ("journalist-image reporters", "television editors", "radio", "multimedia") as well as all the courses provided by the school are taught by working journalists.

=== Graduate level ===
Since 2007, the CFJ has had four graduate educational programs:

- the "main program" or CFJ Diploma, which is entered through a very selective national competitive exam (eligibility file, then written and oral admission tests), open to students with three years of higher education, or through an international competitive exam, in partnership with University of Paris 1 Pantheon-Sorbonne. On average, admitted candidates have completed more than four years of study after the baccalaureate. The diploma is accredited by the French Ministry of Higher Education and Research, and is listed in the Répertoire national des certifications professionnelles;
- the apprenticeship training program, set up in 2007. Admitted by competitive examination or by dossier, CFJ apprentices follow their training in two years with the students and obtain the same diploma, in Paris and Lyon ('Local/Global program'). In 2016, 16 CFJ students are enrolled in the apprenticeship program in Paris. In 2020, 19 CFJ students are enrolled in the apprenticeship program in Lyon.
- the "Data and Investigative Journalism" program, created in 2019 in partnership with Sciences Po Lyon, will enable students to obtain the respective diplomas of the two institutions at the end of two years of training, between Lyon and Paris.

=== Undergraduate level ===
The W School of the CFJ delivers a Bachelor's degree in marketing, communication and journalism, which takes place over three years and offers five specializations:

- the "Journalism, documentary and fiction" program: basic writing techniques, storytelling and screenplays, English, new writing, image and sound techniques;
- the "Marketing and digital communication" program: marketing, strategy and business issues, communication, digital strategy, Business English;
- the "Sport and e-sport" program: sports journalism, sports marketing, e-sport issues, sports events, sports law, creation, gaming, sports psychology, in partnership with the Institut National du Sport, de l'Expertise et de la Performance (INSEP). It replaces the CFJ's 'Sportcom' course, launched in 1987;
- the "Entrepreneurship and innovation" program: innovations and new technologies, digital marketing, management, corporate law, Business Plan, English, Project makers;
- the "Narrative luxury" course: Knowing how to be and the codes of luxury, The major trends in fashion and luxury, The stakes of the sector and luxury brands.

The CFJ's W school also delivers a "Sciences and journalism" program in partnership with Sorbonne University since 2020.

The CFJ and the W school have academic partnerships with the French business schools and Grande École HEC Paris, EM Lyon Business School and EDHEC Business School and the University of Paris 1 Pantheon-Sorbonne.

== Accreditation ==
The CFJ is accredited by the Commission paritaire nationale de l'emploi des journalistes (in English : the National Joint Commission for the Employment of Journalists). The CFJ diploma is jointly approved and awarded by the French Ministry of Higher Education. It is also registered in the French Ministry of Employment's National Register of Professional Certifications (RNCP) at level 7 (Master's degree).

== Notable alumni ==
Ranking by promotion year:

- Wendy Bouchard (2006) received the 2013 Golden Women's Trophy in the Media category.
- Frédéric Capron (2004) – Robert Guillain Prize from the France-Japan Association for a documentary film project, "Les Tojis, Maîtres du Saké".
- Anne Le Hénaff (2001) – Prix de la Fondation Varenne 2012 de la radio – 2012 – for her report entitled: "Living with Alzheimer's disease "
- Pierre-François Lemonnier (2001) – Micros d'Or de l'UJSF (Union des journalistes de sport en France) 201032
- François Ruffin (2001) received the César for Best Documentary Film for Merci patron!
- Fabrice Launay (1997) – Albert Londres Prize Audiovisual – 2007 – with Anne Boiret and Gwenlaouen Gouil.
- Piotr Smolar (1997) – International Prize for the CFJ-Groupe Caisse d'Epargne survey 2007
- Clarisse Féletin (1997) – Special Jury Mention at FIGRA 2010 Investigation Award 2010 in the video category for "The Judge and the Dioxin Case "
- Anne-Sophie Lapix (1996) – Philippe Caloni Prize for the best interviewer 2012 – 2012 – for her show " Dimanche " broadcast on Canal+.
- Pascale Kremer (1992) – 2008 Reporters d'espoirs news agency prize for the article "Le studio d'étudiant dans le pré" (Le Monde).
- Vladimir Vasak (1992) – three prizes: WebTV-Festival 2012 de la Rochelle, Jury Prize, category Web-interactive – 2012 – for "Le destin des Halles à Paris", written and directed by Vladimir Vasak, production Kien Production, France Télévisions nouvelles écritures, INA and France 3 Paris-Île-de-France.
- Christophe Ayad (1990) – Albert Londres Prize 2004, Grand Reportage Prize of the "Grands Prix des quotidiens nationaux" 2010 for a report on the Gaza Zoo.
- Natalie Nougayrède (1990) – Albert Londres Prize in the written press – 2005 – for her articles on Chechnya and in particular for her coverage of the deadly hostage-taking in September 2004 in the school of Beslan (Caucasus).
- Jeff Wittenberg (1989) – Franco-German Journalism Prize 2009, television category – 2009 – for his report "La France: une arrogant solitude", a production of the program "Un œil sur la planète" France 2.
- Lorraine Millot (1989) – Prize for the first book of reportage and investigation, Assises du journalisme de Lille 2008 for La Russie nouvelle
- Raphaëlle Bacqué (1988) – Palmarès 2011 des Grands Prix des Quotidiens Nationaux – 2011 – with Béatrice Gurrey (1980) for "Clotilde Reiss – an Iranian passion" published in "Le Monde".
- Jean-Xavier de Lestrade (1987) – Fipa d'or for best screenplay, fiction category, at the 25th Festival International des Programmes Audiovisuels (FIPA) – 2012 – Antoine Lacomblez, screenwriter, for "La Disparition", a Maha Productions production with the participation of France 2.
- Christophe Boltanski (1987) – Bayeux-Calvados War Correspondents' Award 2010, Trophy for written press.
- Nathalie Sapena (1987) – Prize of the news agency Reporters d'espoirs 2008 for the report "Donations of bone marrow" (France 2)
- Philippe Broussard (1985) – Albert Londres Prize Presse écrite – 1993. Le Monde.
- Florence Aubenas (1984) – Amila-Meckert Prize organized by the association Colères du Présent 49- 2010 – for her book "Le quai de Ouistreham". Editions de l'Olivier. Joseph Kessel Prize 2010.
- Laurent Joffrin (1977) – Political Book Prize 2002 – for his book "Le Gouvernement invisible" published by Arlea
- Pierre Haski (1974) – Award for the best foreign site 2012, awarded by the Online News Association (ONA) – 2012 – The online news site Rue89, co-founded by Pierre Haski (74), currently president and director of the publication, received, in the non-English-speaking category, the award for the best foreign site 2012, awarded by the Online News Association (ONA).
- Hervé Chabalier (1969) – Albert Londres Prize Presse écrite – 1979.
