= École de design Nantes Atlantique =

French design school

Coordinates: 47.2833°N 1.5180°W

L'École de design Nantes Atlantique
- Motto in English: Design for Creative Innovation
- Type: Non-profit organisation
- Established: 1988
- Affiliations: CGE, Université de Nantes
- President: Emmanuelle Gaudemer
- Director: Christian Guellerin
- Academic staff: 300
- Administrative staff: 100
- Students: 1465
- Undergraduates: Bachelor level, vocation training center
- Postgraduates: Master Degree in Design
- Location: Nantes, France
- Campus: Atlanpole la Chantrerie, China Studio Shanghai, India Studio Pune, Brazil Studio Sao Paulo, Le Studio Montréal Canada
- Website: en.lecolededesign.com

L’École de design Nantes Atlantique is a private institution for technical education dedicated to the teaching of design. Founded in 1988, it has been managed by the Nantes-Saint Nazaire Chamber of Commerce and Industry since 1991. The school is recognized by the State and is one of the two schools in its field to award a design degree which is accredited by the French Ministry of Higher Education. This degree is also registered in the Registre National des Certifications Professionnelles (the French directory for vocational qualifications) as a Level I Master's degree.

L’École de design is a member of the Conférence des grandes écoles (top-tier French higher education institutions) and is also associated to the Université de Nantes.

It is located in Nantes on the technological campus Atlanpole la Chantrerie and on the Ile de Nantes, as well as in Shanghai (China), Pune (India), São Paulo (Brazil) and Montréal (Canada). The school has been run since 1997 by Christian Guellerin, Managing Director.

== Degree programs ==
L’École de design offers initial training courses including 2-year and 3-year vocational diplomas, and a 5-year curriculum leading to the Diplôme de design, a design degree certified by the French Ministry of Higher Education, registered in the RNCP (Répertoire national des certifications professionnelles / the French directory for vocational qualifications) as a Level I Master's degree. The 5-year curriculum is divided into two parts: a 3-year undergraduate program based on a disciplinary approach to design (Spatial Design, Graphic Design, Interaction Design and Product Design) and 2-year postgraduate program based on a topic-based approach.

== The teaching program ==
The school curriculum is based on partnerships with companies which encourage a professional approach to design and creation. These partnerships may take various forms:

- internships: companies take on 3rd year students from the undergraduate program and 2nd year Master's students for 2-4 month internships,
- prospective studies carried out in partnership with companies, as part of a project-based teaching approach,
- local events for promoting design (e.g. Design Développement, Trophées de design stratégique, Trophées Nantes Shop Design)
- work-study programs: the Vocational Training Center (Centre de Formation des Apprentis or CFA) dedicated to Creation and Industrial Innovation organizes 2- and 3-year vocational diplomas, and master's degrees incorporating apprenticeships and work-study programs.

== International Activities ==
The school is affiliated with the international association Cumulus which associates 226 art and design schools from 49 different countries. From 2007 to 2013, Cumulus was chaired by Christian Guellerin, the school's Managing Director. He is now Honorary President of the association.

Since 1999 at L’École de design, it has been compulsory for all 1st year students on the Master's program to spend a semester abroad. Each year since 2001, the school has hosted fifty to sixty foreign students in its International Class. The International Class is a specific 3rd year program at Bachelor's level fully taught in English and open to French and international students.

On 13 September 2008, the school opened a branch in the People's Republic of China, the China Studio. This program was then transferred to Shanghai in September 2010 in partnership with the University of Shanghai. 60 to 70 postgraduate students are taking part in the Transcultural Design China Studio Master's program. Since January 2017, the school's China Studio has been headed by Eric Mazodier.

In 2010, the school opened a second Master's program: "Transcultural Design India", in partnership with Srishti School of Art, Design and Technology in Bangalore. The program is hosted in the India Studio in Pune, in partnership with MIT school of Design since 2018. Since September 2017 the India Studio is headed by Ms. Helene Thebault.

A third studio opened in São Paulo, Brazil in September 2017, in partnership with the Mackenzie University, with a similar Transcultural Design approach. The studio is run by Benjamin Gagneux, designer.

The fourth international studio opened in Montréal (Canada) in September 2018, in partnership with the Centech, the incubator of the engineering school ÉTS. French students are joining the Studio for a one-year program Design and Entrepreneurship. Le Studio Montréal is headed by Julie Le Ster, designer.

== Research ==
In September 2010, L'École de design Nantes Atlantique opened the applied experimental research in interaction design laboratory, known as the READi Design Lab. The aim of this platform for creation and experimentation is to involve students in research projects thanks to its capacity for prototyping to assess graphic interfaces (Internet, mobile phones, etc.), modalities for interaction (multi-touch, tangible interfaces, etc.) and for producing data representations (prioritization, mapping, etc.). The Design Lab evolved in 2018 to become Human Machine Design Lab. The laboratory is run by Grégoire Cliquet, PhD (Arts et Métiers Paristech).

In January 2012, a second laboratory dedicated to New Eating Habits was set up in the school, directed by Jean Patrick Péché, designer, until 2012 and Benoît Millet between 2012 and 2018. The lab is run by Dolly Daou, PhD (Swinburne University) since June 2018.

In March 2012, a third laboratory dedicated to Sustainable Cities was founded, under the direction of Florent Orsoni, a consultant specializing in the fields of accessibility and Design for All.

In January 2014, a fourth laboratory dedicated to Care, social innovation, health and wellbeing opened. The Care Design Lab is now headed by Clémence Montagne, PhD (Paris 4).

== Notable Alumni ==
- François Hurtaud (1988 - ), French industrial designer
