= Master of Journalism =

Type of post-graduate degree

A Master of Journalism (abbreviated M.J., M.S.J., M.M.J.C., M.A. in Journalism, or M.S. in Journalism) is a master's degree awarded to students who have studied journalism at a graduate level. Like other master's degree programs, master of journalism programs are typically between one and two years.

While some Master of Journalism programs are focused on the academic study of journalism, most are geared towards providing students with journalism skills. Students are usually required to take courses on writing and reporting as well as media law and ethics. Many programs have an internship or co-op component in which students will complete a placement at a working newsroom, magazine office, or other media production outlet. Some programs allow students to specialize in a particular type of journalism, such as broadcast journalism, newspapers, magazines, or online journalism.

== Europe ==
=== France ===
In France, 14 prestigious journalism schools, including five Grandes Écoles (CGE), the French elite academic institutions similar to the Ivy League in the United States or Oxbridge in the UK), offer Master of Journalism programs, accredited by a commission representing the profession (CPNEJ) and by the government.

- School of Journalism, Sciences Po, Paris (CGE)
- Graduate School of Journalism, University of Lille
- Centre de Formation des Journalistes (CGE), Panthéon-Assas University, Paris
- Centre Universitaire d'Enseignement du Journalisme, University of Strasbourg
- Bordeaux Institute of Journalism, Montaigne University, Bordeaux
- Dauphine Institute of Journalism (CGE), Paris Sciences et Lettres University
- Toulouse Journalism School
- School of Journalism and Mass Communication, Aix-Marseille University
- School of Journalism, University of Tours
- CELSA Graduate School of Mass Communication and Journalism (CGE), Sorbonne University
- Journalism Department of the French Press Institute, Panthéon-Assas University, Paris
- School of Journalism, Sciences Po Grenoble (CGE), University of Grenoble

There are also other Master of Journalism (not accredited) offered by public or private universities or colleges:

- School of Journalism, Sciences Po Rennes (CGE), University of Rennes
- Institute of Mass Communication and Media, Sorbonne Nouvelle University, Paris
- School of Journalism, CY Cergy Paris University
- Journalism, Mass Communication and Scientific Culture Department, Paris Cité University
- School of Journalism, Sciences Po Toulouse (CGE), Federal University of Toulouse
- PHILLIA Department of Arts, Philosophy, Information and Mass Communication, Nanterre University, Paris
- Journalism and Digital Media Department, University of Lorraine, Metz
- Institute of Mass Communication, Lumière University, Lyon
- Department of History and Journalism, Catholic University of Lille
- Institute of All Media Journalism, Catholic University of Lille

== North America ==
=== Canada ===
Master of Journalism (M.J. or M.M.J.C.) programs are offered at the following Canadian Universities:

- Ryerson University, Toronto, Ontario
- University of Western Ontario, London, Ontario
- Carleton University, Ottawa, Ontario
- University of British Columbia, Vancouver, British Columbia
- University of King's College, Halifax, Nova Scotia
- University of Regina, Regina, Saskatchewan

=== United States ===
==== Alabama ====
- Department of Journalism and Creative Media, The University of Alabama (M.A.)

==== Arizona ====
- Walter Cronkite School of Journalism and Mass Communication, Arizona State University (M.A.)
- School of Journalism, College of Social and Behavioral Sciences, the University of Arizona (M.A.)

==== Arkansas ====
- School of Journalism and Strategic Media, J. William Fulbright College of Arts and Sciences, the University of Arkansas (M.A.)

==== California ====
- UC Berkeley Graduate School of Journalism, the University of California at Berkeley (M.J.)
- Annenberg School for Communication and Journalism, the University of Southern California (M.S.)
- Graduate Program in Journalism, Stanford University (M.A.)

==== Colorado ====
- School of Journalism and Mass Communication, the University of Colorado at Boulder (M.A.)
- Department of Journalism and Technical Communication, Colorado State University (M.S.)

==== District of Columbia ====
- School of Communication, American University (M.A.)

==== Florida ====
- School of Communication, University of Miami (M.A.)
- Department of Journalism and Media Studies, University of South Florida (M.A.)

==== Georgia ====
- Henry W. Grady College of Journalism and Mass Communication, the University of Georgia (M.A.)

==== Illinois ====
- College of Communications, University of Illinois (M.J., M.S.)
- Medill School of Journalism, Northwestern University (M.S.J.)

==== Indiana ====
- College of Communication, Information, and Media, Ball State University (M.A.)

==== Iowa ====
- School of Journalism and Mass Communication, the University of Iowa (M.A.)
- Greenlee School of Journalism and Communication, Iowa State University (M.S.)

==== Kansas ====
- William Allen White School of Journalism, the University of Kansas (M.S.)
- A.Q. Miller School of Journalism and Mass Communications, Kansas State University (M.S.)

==== Maryland ====
- Philip Merrill College of Journalism, the University of Maryland (M.J.)

==== Massachusetts ====
- Department of Journalism, Boston University (M.S.)
- Department of Journalism, Emerson College (M.A.)
- School of Journalism, Northeastern University (M.A.)
- Division of Continuing Education, Harvard Extension School (M.L.A.)

==== Michigan ====
- School of Journalism, Michigan State University (M.A.)

==== Mississippi ====
- School of Journalism and New Media, the University of Mississippi (M.A.)

==== Missouri ====
- Missouri School of Journalism, the University of Missouri (M.A.)

==== Montana ====
- School of Journalism, the University of Montana (M.A., Environmental Science and Natural Resource Journalism)

==== Nebraska ====
- College of Journalism and Mass Communications, University of Nebraska–Lincoln (M.A.)

==== Nevada ====
- Hank Greenspun School of Journalism and Media Studies, University of Nevada Las Vegas, (M.A.)
- Reynolds School of Journalism, at the University of Nevada, Reno (M.A.)

==== New York ====
- Columbia University Graduate School of Journalism, Columbia University (M.S., M.S. Data, M.A.)
- Arthur L. Carter Journalism Institute, New York University (M.A.)
- Craig Newmark Graduate School of Journalism, City University of New York (M.A.)
- S. I. Newhouse School of Public Communications, Syracuse University (M.A., M.S.)

==== North Carolina ====
- Hussman School of Journalism and Media, the University of North Carolina at Chapel Hill (M.A.)

==== Ohio ====
- School of Journalism and Mass Communication, Kent State University (M.A.)
- E. W. Scripps School of Journalism, Ohio University (M.S.)

==== Oklahoma ====
- Gaylord College of Journalism and Mass Communication, University of Oklahoma (M.A.

==== Oregon ====
- School of Journalism and Communication, the University of Oregon (M.A.)

==== Pennsylvania ====
- School of Communication, Point Park University (M.A.)
- School of Communications and Theater, Temple University (M.A.)

==== Texas ====
- Moody College of Communication, University of Texas at Austin (M.A.)
- Department of Journalism, Public Relations and New Media, Baylor University (M.A., M.I.J.)
- Mayborn School of Journalism, the University of North Texas (M.A., M.J.)

==== Virginia ====
- School of Communication and the Arts, Regent University (M.A.)

==== West Virginia ====
- W. Page Pitt School of Journalism and Mass Communications, Marshall University (M.A.)
- Perley Isaac Reed School of Journalism, West Virginia University (M.S.)

==== Wisconsin ====
- School of Journalism and Mass Communication, the University of Wisconsin–Madison (M.A.)
