= CNCP =

CNCP may refer to:

- China National Petroleum Corporation, Chinese petroleum company
- CNCP Telecommunications, Canadian telecom company
- Commission nationale de la certification professionnelle, French National Commission for Vocational Certification
