= KSDB-FM =

- Manhattan, Kansas; United States
- Broadcast area: Flint Hills
- Frequency: 91.9 MHz
- Branding: Wildcat 91.9, You Belong

Programming
- Format: New alternative and hip hop

Ownership
- Owner: Kansas State University

History
- Founded: March 19, 1949
- First air date: April 2, 1951; 75 years ago
- Former names: DB92, KSDB-FM
- Former frequencies: 88.1 MHz

Technical information
- Licensing authority: FCC
- Facility ID: 33351
- Class: A
- ERP: 1,400 watts
- HAAT: 88 meters
- Transmitter coordinates: 39°11′17.47″N 96°34′57.02″W

Links
- Public license information: Public file; LMS
- Webcast: https://s.radiowave.io/ksdb.mp3
- Website: http://wildcat919.com

KSDB-FM, branded as Wildcat 91.9 FM, is Kansas State University's campus radio station. A non-commercial radio station located in Manhattan, Kansas, broadcasting on 91.9 MHz on the FM dial, Wildcat 91.9 is staffed exclusively by students at Kansas State University who gain valuable experience in all areas of radio broadcasting. It plays new alternative and hip hop music, as well as a range of local specialty programming, and is under the jurisdiction of the A.Q. Miller School of Media and Communication.

The station has been broadcasting on the FM band since spring of 1950 and is currently located on the third floor of McCain on the campus of Kansas State. Previously, the station broadcast on the campus carrier current AM system, and had studios located in Nichols Gymnasium. When Nichols burned down in 1968, Wildcat 91.9 operated from temporary locations until McCain Auditorium was completed. The station still maintains studios and offices there, and has a separate studio located in the K-State Student Union.

Wildcat 91.9 is thought to be the oldest continuously running student-led college FM radio station in the United States, perhaps even the world.

== History ==
=== Early years ===
Wildcat 91.9 began as an experiment on the third floor of Nichols Gymnasium in 1949. The first broadcasts began in earnest in March, but KSDB was a commercial station by June. Wildcat 91.9's commercial status allowed it to be self-supporting. Instead of a tower, the station broadcast over the campus power system. Broadcasting as a wired-wireless (or carrier current) station meant the signals never went more than a few hundred feet from power lines. This was within the maximum distance allowed by the Federal Communications Commission (FCC). At this time, the station was a member of the Intercollegiate Broadcasting System and under the direction of the Speech Department and Prof. George L. Arms.

Wildcat 91.9 initially broadcast at 560 kHz. At this frequency, “practically the only way to hear the station was to sit on the steps of Nichols gym with a portable radio.” The station switched to 660 in December 1949, which “resulted in a marked improvement in reception.”

Programming for Wildcat 91.9 in the first year went from an hour of music at first, to about four hours of music, talk, and sports by November 2, 1949. The schedules for KSDB and KSAC were printed in the Kansas State Collegian. Wildcat 91.9 was on the air for 6 hours each weekday by November 20, 1950.

A television workshop established in 1948 gave radio-television students experience in another medium. Programs could be televised into two TV classrooms in Nichols Gymnasium.

On March 14, 1949, Wildcat 91.9 went on the air as a wired-wireless (carrier current) AM station, originally at 560 kHz; in December, it changed frequency to 660 kHz. The station became an FM outlet on April 2, 1951, broadcasting with 10 watts at 88.1 MHz, thanks to a transmitter donated by Senator Arthur Capper. Wendall Wilson was the first K-State student to broadcast on Wildcat 91.9.

=== The Nichols fire ===
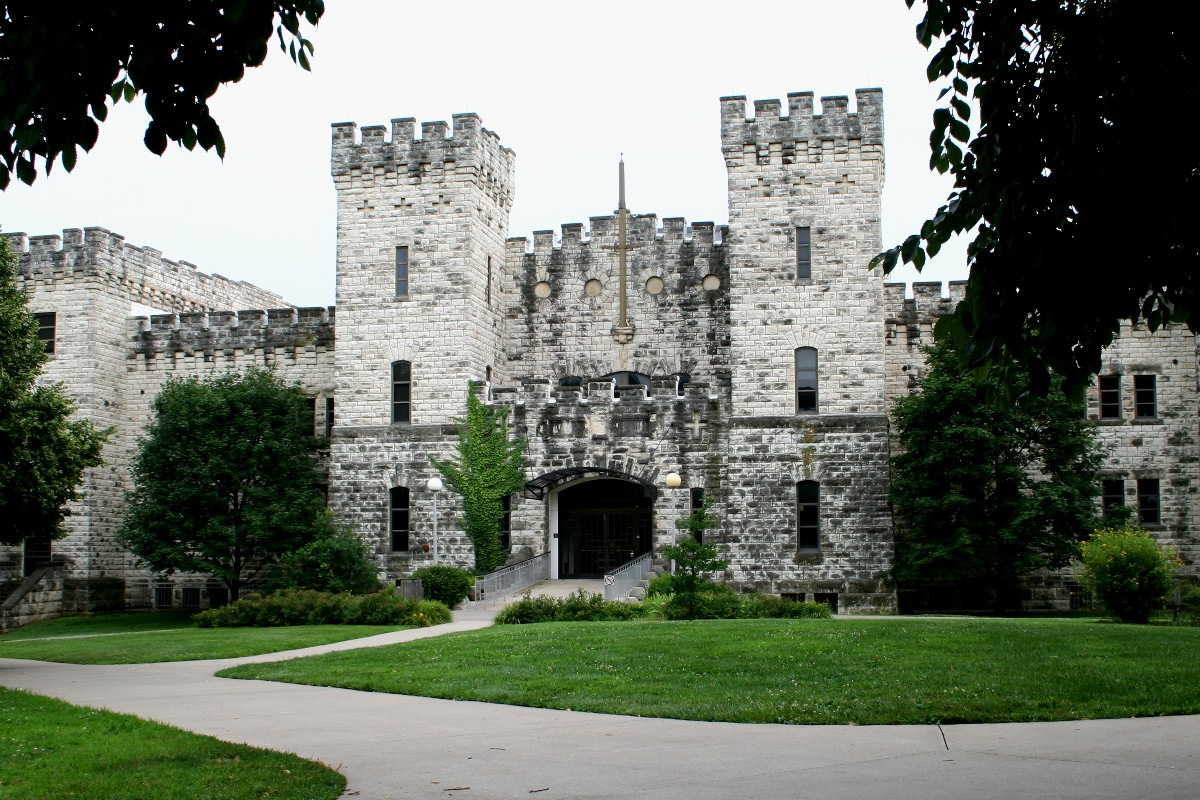
Nichols Hall

On Friday, December 13, 1968, Nichols Gymnasium was burned by arsonists. The fire "completely wiped out" Wildcat 91.9, along with the Music Department and Physical Education. The only piece of music to survive the fire was the Wabash Cannonball, which became one of K-State's main fight songs. The Wildcat 91.9 disc jockey on the air reportedly said "Due to circumstances beyond our control, we are leaving the air early."

For Wildcat 91.9, the loss was tremendous. The December 16 Kansas State Collegian quoted then-station manager Kenneth Mroziniski as saying, "We lost a brand new Gage transmitter, Gage board console, new producer console, two new turntables and two tape recorders." Virginia Howe was head of radio and television at the time. "A writer for the radio version of The Lone Ranger, she lost a near lifetime of documents and records." Lowell Jack was station manager at KMAN and came to Wildcat 91.9's rescue.

Later that year Wildcat 91.9 moved into the fifth floor of Farrell Library (now Hale Library). The space was provided by Professor Richard Farley, administrator of the library. The 1971 Royal Purple yearbook indicates Wildcat 91.9 was using $70,000 worth of new equipment purchased since April, 1970. The quiet atmosphere of the library was in stark contrast to the bustling radio station. In addition, low ceilings hampered the ability of the television workshop to provide adequate lighting for scenes. Wildcat 91.9 continued to exist in this location until students heard of the planned expansion of the auditorium (to be renamed McCain Auditorium) and lobbied for space. In 1976, Wildcat 91.9 moved into the third floor of McCain Auditorium.

In 1988, the KMAN/KMKF (Manhattan Broadcasting Company) studios on Casement Road caught fire. Representatives from Wildcat 91.9 offered studio space, and KMKF was back on the air in only 12 hours. KMAN took longer to get back on the air. According to Lowell Jack, "They made the offer before firemen had the fire under control." Manhattan Broadcasting employees were using some KSDB equipment that had been donated after the Nichols Fire.

=== Recent past ===
In 1987, Wildcat 91.9 upgraded to a 1,400-watt transmitter which is still in use today. KAKE-TV in Wichita donated a tower for the transmitter. Wildcat 91.9 purchased automation equipment in 1997 which allowed it to broadcast 24 hours per day.

Wildcat 91.9 officially moved into a new studio in the K-State Student Union on July 1, 2002 under the leadership of Candace Walton. The studio was fitted with all-new digital equipment. In the spring of 2013, Wildcat 91.9 was awarded 14 undergraduate radio awards, the most awarded to any institution in the state. In the fall of 2015, Wildcat 91.9 moved back to McCain due to the renovations at the K-State Student Union, which is where the main studio and offices remain, while an open mic is set up in the Union Studios.

In 2018, KSDB was rebranded to Wildcat 91.9 when Ian Punnett took over as chief operator. Under Punnett's instruction, Wildcat 91.9 saw marked improvement in all aspects of programming, production value, content, on-air talent, and student leadership. In 2023, Wildcat 91.9 was named the number one college radio station in the nation by the Intercollegiate Broadcasting System Awards. The station won Best College/University Radio Station (over 10,000) and the Abraham and Borst Award for best overall station in the country, the first national championship in program history. This prompted the creation of the alternate tagline used primarily during live sports broadcasts, "The number one college radio station in the nation." Wildcat 91.9 was a finalist for the same awards in 2024 but was not awarded back-to-back championships. Wildcat 91.9 also saw significant development in terms of Kansas Association of Broadcaster student and professional awards. The station took second place in consecutive years for Best Medium Market Station at the KAB professional awards in 2022 and 2023, missing the first place spot to only Kansas Public Radio, the Kansas NPR affiliate. Punnett was chief operator from 2018 until his death in 2023. Professor of Practice at Kansas State and TV director, Andrew Smith, was named the new chief operator in January, 2024.

== Changes ==
Former DB92 logo on a wall outside the KSDB offices in McCain Auditorium

Wildcat 91.9 has gone through multiple programming and identity changes throughout its existence. Due to the transient nature of college radio, students typically commit no more than four years to the station, providing much variance. Since the early 1980s, Wildcat 91.9 has been known for its diverse programming, which has taken such titles as, “Urban,” “Jam the Box,” “Nights,” and others, which typically aired in the evenings. Along with station programming, the station dropped its longtime moniker of DB92 in favor of KSDB in the late 1990s. The name was changed yet again to 91.9 KSDB in 2014. In 2018, under the direction of Ian Punnett, the station rebranded to Wildcat 91.9, with the tagline, "New Music Now." At the end of the fall semester, 2022, the tagline was changed to, "You Belong" to facilitate a more inclusive, community-based environment.

Wildcat 91.9, in its current state, is the product of much recognition including improvement of diverse programs that change with the student body over the years. Programming decisions are made collectively by the student executive board, who then make recommendations to the chief operator for final approval. Financial and administrative duties like FCC licensing are handled by the station chief operator. This balance of freedom and oversight has resulted in numerous awards from the Kansas Association of Broadcasters for Wildcat 91.9 students.

== Programming ==
Original logo as "The Wildcat"

Students have been allowed to make programming decisions since 1999. "Program and content decisions will be made by the executive staff in weekly meetings in which the program director will serve as chair." Current music programming features new alternative and hip hop. Throughout the day, a range of shows play, providing approximately six hours of regularly scheduled programming, Monday through Friday, with specialty shows playing on the weekend.

Wildcat 91.9 sports announcers broadcast home football, men's and women's basketball, women's soccer, and sporadic baseball and volleyball games, as well as select away games as finances allow. Wildcat 91.9 boasts award winning sports talk shows, Monday through Friday, from 6-7pm. Notably, Wildcat 91.9 provided live coverage of the 2022 Big 12 Championship Game, broadcasting live from AT&T Stadium as Kansas State would upset TCU to win the conference title and advance to the Sugar Bowl. The game was called by senior Anthony Gorges and graduate student Kolby Van Camp. Van Camp would call the game winning field goal from kicker Ty Zentner in overtime in an instant classic moment for the station, shouting, "K-State wins! K-State wins! K-State wins!" The broadcast would also make Wildcat 91.9 history as it would feature freshman sideline reporter, Emma Wiley and senior videographer Dawson Wagner. The studio broadcast was anchored by graduate student Jazsmin Halliburton and senior Jacob Hall, with contributions from the studio from junior A.J. Shaw and live from the stands of AT&T stadium from sophomore Jon Grove. Andrew Jacob Cummings served as board operator for the historic broadcast, with Ian Punnett and Andrew Smith producing in the studio.

Currently on Wildcat 91.9, national news reports are aired from NBC News Radio, and local reports and weather are facilitated by the news staff.

From its earliest days, Wildcat 91.9 has built its programming around music, talk, and sports. By the late 1950s, programming for Wildcat 91.9 had expanded to include adaptations of novels, children's programs, and interviews with movie-goers directly from theaters. In 1952, KSDB was the only station to broadcast K-State's basketball games in the West.

The station has also hosted public affairs programs through the years, such as "Kat's Eye" and "A Purple Affair."

== Staff ==
Outside of the chief operator position which is held by a Kansas State faculty member, the executive committee of Wildcat 91.9 is composed of undergraduate and graduate students who oversee the daily operation of the station, year-round.

Director of Wildcat Electronic Media: Andrew Smith

Assistant Director of Wildcat Electronic Media: Dawson Wagner

Programming Director: Nate Lowen

News Director: Declan Phipps

Music Director: Ella Murray

Promotions Director: Aubrey Hopper

Sports Director: Adam Donner

Production Director: Hank Corsair

Digital Systems Engineer: Brody Zwiebel

Website Manager: Andy Jordan

== Awards ==
Wildcat 91.9 has seen a significant jump in success at regional, national, and international competitions. Notably, Wildcat 91.9 was named the best college radio station in the nation by the Intercollegiate Broadcasting System Awards in 2023 and was a finalist for the same award in 2024.

2023 Intercollegiate Broadcasting System Awards:

- Abraham and Borst Award - Best Overall Station
- Best College/University Station (over 10,000)
- Best News Feature Story - Dawson Wagner
- Best Graduate Advisor, Radio or Television - Kolby Van Camp

2024 Intercollegiate Broadcasting System Awards:

- Best Sports Report - Jacob Hall
- Best Graduate Advisor, Radio or Television - Kolby Van Camp

Wildcat 91.9 has also seen a substantial increase in representation at the Kansas Association of Broadcasters Awards, both on the student and professional stages.

In 2023, Wildcat Electronic Media (a conglomeration of Wildcat 91.9 and Channel 8 KKSU-TV) was competitive in 29-of-31 categories (audio and visual) for the KAB 2023 Student Awards in the college division. This meant that a Kansas State University student took an honor in 93.5% of all categories. Wildcat Electronic Media swept five categories (all places) in Best Episodic Entertainment Program (audio), Best Social Media (audio), Complete Sports Feature (visual), Best On-Air Personality (audio) and Best Public Affairs/Talk Show Program (audio). Out of all available first places spots, Wildcat Electronic Media would win 19-of-31 or 61.2% of all first place finishes. No other college in Kansas had more than five first place finishes. Out of all awards, (first, second, and honorable mention), Wildcat Electronic Media would win 41-of-88 placements, meaning 46.5% of all awards in the college division went to Kansas State radio, television, or digital media creation. By comparison, no other Kansas institution had more than 13 total.

Similarly, in 2024, Wildcat Electronic Media would win 40 awards across both audio and visual categories and be competitive in 25-of-31 categories (80.6%). The next closest school would win 12 awards. Wildcat Electronic Media would also sweep five categories: Best Special Programming (visual), Best Public Affairs/Talk Show Program (audio), Best Newscast (audio), Complete Sports Feature (audio), and Best Sportscast (audio). Wildcat Electronic Media would also continue its first place dominance, winning 16-of-31 first place finishes (51.6%) and 40-of-83 possible awards (48.1%). Dawson Wagner is one of the winningest students of all time for Wildcat Electronic Media.

2023 Kansas Association of Broadcasters Student Awards:

1st Place:

- Best Episodic Entertainment Program (audio) - K-State Today Event - Dawson Wagner
- Best General News Story (audio) - Manhattan sees over $11 million in storm damage - Dawson Wagner
- Best General News Story (visual) - Aggieville Employee Parking Problem - Dawson Wagner
- Best Podcast (audio) - The Sands of Time - Speech Therapy - Dawson Wagner
- Best Social Media (visual) - K-State's Snowy 160th Birthday - Dawson Wagner
- Best Feature (audio) - The Farm Report with Hannah Whetstone - Hannah Whetstone
- Best Newscast (audio) - Feel Good News from the Farm - Hannah Whetstone
- Best Podcast (visual) - Kolby Van Camp Wildcat Podcast - Kolby Van Camp
- Best Public Affairs/Talk Show Program (audio) - Training Camp with Kolby Van Camp - Kolby Van Camp
- Best Feature (visual) - Fighting Food Insecurity One Meal at a Time - Kate Kennedy
- Best Complete Sports Feature (visual) - Opera Play-by-Play - Jacob Hall
- Best :60 Second or Less Commercial-PSA or Non-Commercial Donor Announcement (audio) - Chili Crawl Promotion - Blake Crawford
- Best Complete Sports Feature (audio) - K-State E-Sports Feature - Brody Zwiebel
- Best On-Air Personality (audio) - The Lanie and Hailey Show - Lanie Henry and Hailey Case
- Best Sportscast (audio) - Oklahoma State vs K-State Football Pre-Game Show - Kolby Van Camp and Anthony Georges
- Best Public Affairs/Talk Show Program (visual) - Political Polarization in Kansas: Channel 8 News - Eden Brockman and Dawson Wagner
- Best Social Media (audio) - Wildcat 91.9 Social Media - Wildcat 91.9 FM
- Best Newscast (visual) - Channel 8 News Spring 2023 - February 23, 2023 - Eden Brockman, Dawson Wagner, Andrew Shaw, Landon Platter, Breanna Palmer, and Blake Crawford
- Best Special Programming (visual) - MHK All-Day: 2022 Sports Special - Jacob Hall, Dawson Wagner, Blake Crawford, Landon Platter, Aaron Magill, and Ryan Zielsdorf

Second Place:

- Best Feature (audio) - K-State Ukrainian student shares his hopes for the future of his home - Dawson Wagner
- Best Newscast (audio) - Voter Registration and Ukraine Newscast - Dawson Wagner
- Best Station Promotion (audio) - Can we just play some music please? - Dawson Wagner
- Best On-Air Personality (audio) - Training Camp with Kolby Van Camp - Kolby Van Camp
- Best Public Affairs/Talk Show Program (audio) - Ad Astra Sports special interview with Will Howard and Ty Zentner - Anthony Gorges
- Best Sports Play-by-Play (audio) - Play-by-Play K-State Football vs Texas - Anthony Gorges
- Complete Sports Feature (visual) - Rowing with the K-State Crew - Landon Reinhardt
- Best General News Story (visual) - New EMS Station to Cut Response Time - Landon Reinhardt
- Best Episodic Entertainment Program (audio) - The Nat 1 Podcast - Heads go Rollin' - Adolfo Blanco
- Best Station Website (visual) - Wildcat Electronic Media: Channel 8 News - Brody Zwiebel
- Best Social Media (audio) - The Big 12 Championship - Wildcat 91.9 FM
- Best Station Website (audio) - Wildcat 91.9 Website - Dawson Wagner, Kolby Van Camp, and Brody Zwiebel

Honorable Mention:

- Best Complete Sports Feature (visual) - How does the Big 12 Championship Happen? - Dawson Wagner
- Best On-Air Personality (visual) - Dawson Wagner - Channel 8 News - Dawson Wagner
- Best Social Media (audio) - Hannah Whetstone on Social Media - Hannah Whetstone
- Best Sports Play-by-Play - Overtime of KU vs K-State Basketball Game - Kolby Van Camp
- Best Sportscast (visual) - Blake Crawford - Sports Update Feb 23, 2023 - Blake Crawford
- Best Special Programming (audio) - Lanie and Hailey Highlight the GRAMMYs - Lanie Henry and Hailey Case
- Best Sports Color Commentator or Sideline Reporter (audio) - Big 12 Championship Color Commentary - Anthony Gorges and Kolby Van Camp
- Best Public Affairs/Talk Show Program (audio) - The Shake 'N Blake Show with Blake Crawford and Jon Grove - Blake Crawford and Jon Grove
- Best Newscast (visual) - Channel 8 News Spring 2022, March 9, 2022 - Lina Sattarin, Claiborn Schmidt, Landon Reinhardt, and Kate Kennedy

== Notable alumni ==
- Gordon Jump, TV actor and Maytag Man
- Mitch Holthus, voice of the Kansas City Chiefs
- Craig Bolerjack, voice of the Utah Jazz and NCAA college basketball announcer
- Steve Physioc, formerly play-by-play announcer for the local telecasts of Los Angeles Angels of Anaheim baseball games and now announcer on Fox Sports Kansas City and the Royals Radio Network for the Kansas City Royals baseball club.

== See also ==
- Campus radio
- List of college radio stations in the United States
