= Ionna Vautrin =

French artist, illustrator, and designer

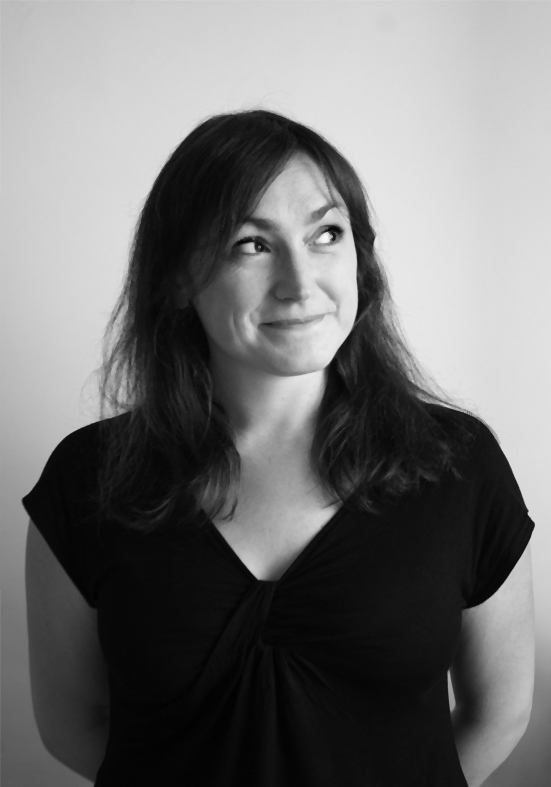
- Vautrin in 2012
- Born: 23 October 1979 (age 47); Hennebont
- Education: École de design Nantes Atlantique
- Awards: Officier of the Ordre des Arts et des Lettres
- Website: www.ionnavautrin.com

Ionna Vautrin (born 1979) is a French artist, illustrator, and designer.

== Early life and education ==
Ionna Vautrin was born in Hennebont, Brittany. She studied at the École de design Nantes Atlantique, and graduated in 2002. Prior to founding her own design studio, Vautrin worked for Camper in Spain, George Sowden in Italy, and the Bouroullec brothers in France.

== Career ==
Vautrin has designed products for companies and clients such as Christian Dior, Kvadrat, Foscarini, JCDecaux, Lexon, Monoprix, Schneider Electric, Serralunga, and the French national railways, for which she designed interior aspects of its TGV trains. In 2024, she was selected by the Archdiocese of Paris to design the new seating and pews for the renovation of Notre-Dame de Paris following the 2019 fire which gutted the cathedral.

A book featuring Vautrin's illustrations titled Le Kamasutra was published by Flammarion in 2017.

Her work has been exhibited widely and is in public collections in France and internationally.

== Honours ==
Vautrin was made an Officier de l'ordre des Arts et des Lettres in 2025.

== Publications ==
- Vautrin, Ionna (2017). Le kamasutra. Flammarion. ISBN 978-2-08-140433-5.
