= Laurent Joffrin =

French journalist (born 1952)

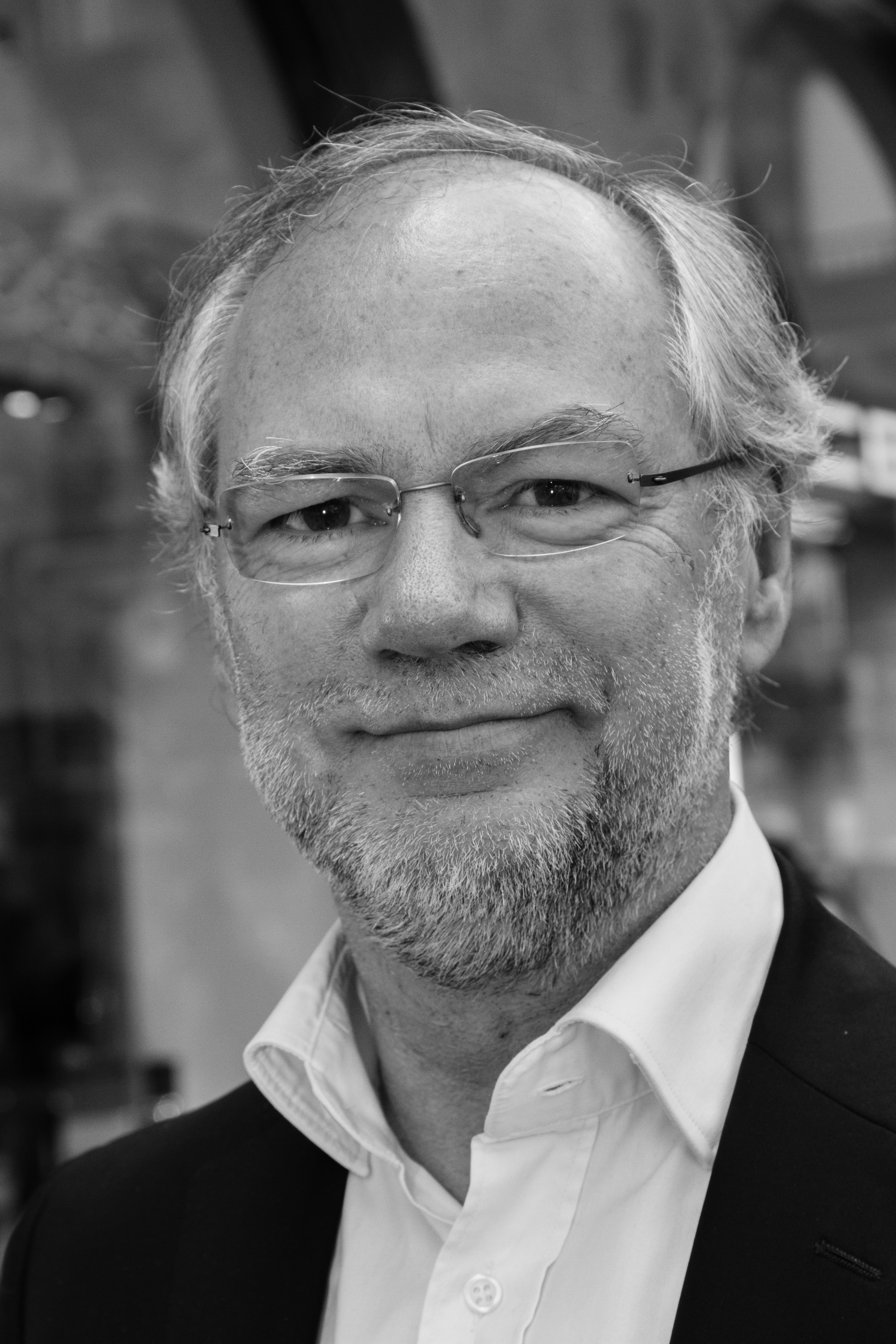
- Joffrin in 2013
- Born: Laurent Mouchard; 30 June 1952 (age 73); Vincennes, France
- Education: Sciences Po; Centre de formation des journalistes
- Occupation: Journalist
- Employer(s): Libération (1981-1988, 1996-); L'Obs (1988-1996)
- Known for: Editor-in-chief Libération

Laurent Joffrin (born 30 June 1952) is a French journalist and the editor of the newspaper Libération.

== Selected publications ==
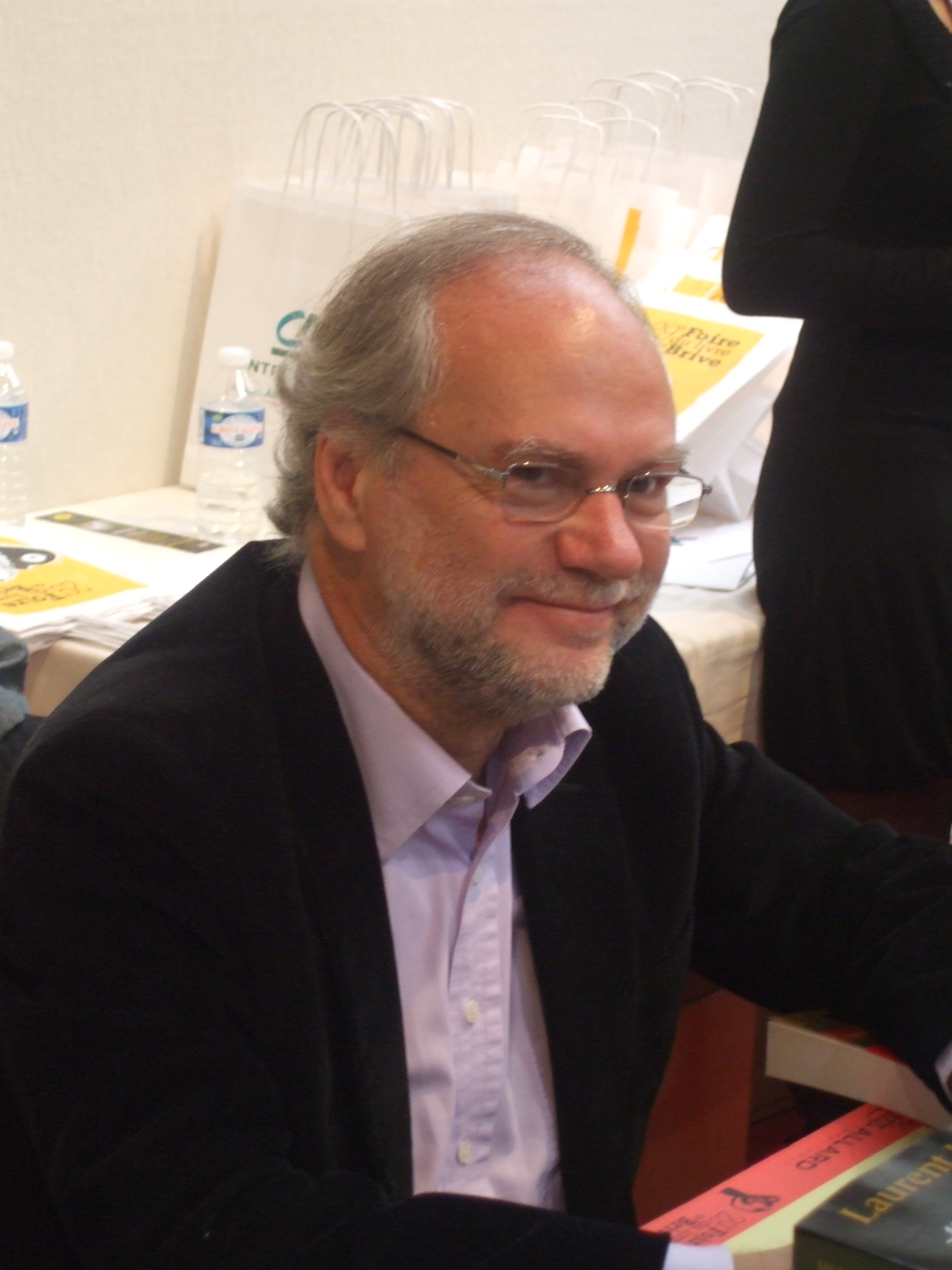
Joffrin in 2010

- La Gauche en voie de disparition, Éditions du Seuil, 1984 ISBN 9782020069373
- Coluche, c'est l'histoire d'un mec, with Serge July and Jacques Lanzmann, Solar, 1986 ISBN 9782263011245
- Un coup de jeune, portrait d'une génération morale, Arléa, 1987 ISBN 9782869590144
- Mai 68, une histoire du mouvement, Seuil, 1988 ISBN 2020101637 ; rééd. Points Histoire, series "Document", 2008 ISBN 9782757807286
- Cabu en Amérique, with Jean-Claude Guillebaud, Seuil, 1990 ISBN 2020122499
- La Régression française, Seuil, 1992 ISBN 9782020231077
- La Gauche retrouvée, Seuil, 1994 ISBN 9782020213622
- Yougoslavie, suicide d'une nation, Mille et Une Nuits, 1995 ISBN 9782842050276
- Kosovo, la guerre du droit, followed by Yougoslavie, suicide d'une nation, Mille et Une Nuits, 1999 ISBN 9782842054175
- Où est passée l'autorité ?, with Philippe Tesson, NiL Éditions, 2000
- Les Batailles de Napoléon, Seuil, 2000 ISBN 9782020289931
- Le Gouvernement invisible, naissance d'une démocratie sans le peuple, Arléa, 2001 ISBN 9782869595538
- La Princesse oubliée, novel, Éditions Robert Laffont, 2002 ISBN 9782221092996
- C'était nous, novel, Robert Laffont, 2004 ISBN 9782221101001
- Les Grandes batailles navales, de Salamine à Midway, Seuil, 2005 ISBN 9782020498388
- Histoire de la gauche caviar, Robert Laffont, 2006 ISBN 9782221104859
- La Gauche bécassine, Robert Laffont, 2007 ISBN 9782221108895
- Le Roi est nu, Robert Laffont, 2008 ISBN 9782221110867
- Média-paranoïa, Seuil, 2009 ISBN 9782020975421
- La Grande histoire des codes secrets, Privé, May 2009 ISBN 9782350760827
- L'Énigme de la rue Saint Nicaise – Les aventures de Donatien Lachance, détective de Napoléon, Robert Laffont, 2010 ISBN 9782221122242
- Les Énigmes Kennedy, Omnibus, 2011 ISBN 9782258084445
- Le Grand Complot, Laffont, 2013 ISBN 978-2-221-13070-4
- Le Réveil français, Stock, 2015 ISBN 978-2-234-08026-3
