= Titre (degree) =

Titre à Finalité Professionnelle (degree)
- Acronym: Titre
- Type: Vocational degree
- Duration: One to three years
- Regions: France

In France, a Titre, officially a Titre à Finalité Professionnelle (in English: "Vocational Degree", "Professional Diploma", or "Certified Title"), or a Titre RNCP (in English: "RNCP qualification"), is a state-recognized professional certification in the French education system.

The Titre is issued by a ministry or certifying institution, generally a private college (Écoles) or a university (and in some cases public university), after approval and registration in the RNCP, the "National Professional Qualifications Register", by the Vocational Certification Commission of France Compétences, the national regulatory authority for vocational training.

As such, it is the main certification procedure for private higher education programs in France and determines the quality and value of the program on the job market.

It can become an accredited diploma (a Diplôme Visé) following an evaluation procedure by the French Ministry of Higher Education and Research, which judges the academic quality of the training. Through an additional evaluation procedure, an accredited diploma can also award a Bachelor's (Licence) or master's degree.

== Definition ==
In French higher education, these vocational qualifications can deliver a level of 120 ECTS, 300 ECTS (Bachelor level, but not delivering a Licence or Bachelor university degree) or 120 ECTS (Master level, but not delivering a Master university degree) after a Titre of 300 ECTS.

Unlike a national (Diplôme National) or accredited diploma (Diplôme Visé), a Titre à Finalité Professionnelle is a professional certification of an academic program that is not systematically issued at the request of a government ministry. Only accreditation by the Ministry of Higher Education validates the academic level of a program. In this case, it is only a professional endorsement. They can be issued by private colleges, public or private training organizations, chambers of commerce and industry or chambers of trade and crafts. The registration of a Titre in the national registers (RNCP or RS) follows an assessment procedure carried out by the Vocational Certification Commission of France Compétences, the public agency of the French Ministry of Labor, on the relevance and quality of the skills repository and its relevance to the needs of the economy. The information required for registration applications is set by order of the minister for vocational training. The Titre à Finalité Professionnelle is generally awarded by a private college or university (the certifying institution) after a Bachelor's-level program at a École Consulaire or a private or non-profit college (École) or Grande École.

It should not be confused with the Titre Professionnel (professional certification), which is a type of Titre, but issued on behalf of the French State by the Ministry of Labor. France Compétences therefore recommends that certifying institutions other than government ministries use the terminology Titre à Finalité Professionnelle or Certification Professionnelle (in English: "Vocational certificate").

== See also ==
- Répertoire national des certifications professionnelles
- France compétences
