= McDill "Huck" Boyd =

American newspaper publisher

- Born: April 17, 1907; Phillipsburg, Kansas
- Died: 9 January 1987 (aged 79); Wichita, Kansas
- Occupation: Publisher
- Spouse: Marie (Kreikenbaum) Boyd
- Children: Marcia (Boyd) Krauss, Patricia Boyd

McDill "Huck" Boyd (April 17, 1907 – January 9, 1987) was a noted small-town newspaper publisher in Phillipsburg, Kansas, United States, and twice a candidate for governor of that state.

== Journalism career ==
Boyd for decades was the publisher of The Phillips County Review, a weekly newspaper in his hometown. His parents, Frank W. and Mamie Alexander Boyd, purchased the paper the year he was born; Frank had previously been the editor since 1902 of the Phillips County Post. The couple changed the name of the paper from the Post to the Review. There was considerable competition at that time in sparsely populated Phillips County, with four other newspapers in Phillipsburg and other publications in neighboring, smaller towns.

Huck, the Boyds' first child, joined the newspaper staff in 1929 as a junior editor when the Great Depression caused him to withdraw from college and return home to help his parents. The Boyd family was deeply involved in the newspaper business. Huck's brother, "Bus" (given name Frank), after a stellar sports career at Kansas State Agricultural College (now Kansas State University) coached sports for a time but later became editor of the Jewell County Record in Mankato, Kansas. Nephews and nieces (and their descendants) of Huck Boyd have also operated the Hill City Times and Norton Daily Telegram, among Kansas newspapers.

Huck Boyd also served as president of the Kansas Press Association.

Four members of the Boyd family — Frank W., Mamie, Bus, and Huck — have been inducted into the Kansas Newspaper Hall of Fame. Huck was inducted in 1990.

Fellow Kansas Newspaper Hall-of-Famer Henry Jameson once said of Boyd: "(He) has that rare knack for pulling people together and getting things done, with a minimum of fuss and fanfare. He never hogs the spotlight. He appears to be in the background - but all the time he's out front calling the signals."

== Community involvement ==
Huck Boyd was very involved in his community, state and region as a promoter of business and industry. He played key roles in bringing the first Cooperative Refinery to Phillipsburg, establishing the Mid States Port Authority which bought and maintained 465 miles of rail line after the Rock Island Railroad went bankrupt in the late 1970s, and obtained legislative approval to solve the small-town doctor shortage in western Kansas by establishing rural family practice residencies, an idea later copied in other states.

He was a former student and ardent supporter of Kansas State University in Manhattan, which now boasts the Huck Boyd National Institute for Rural Development and the Huck Boyd National Center for Community Media at the A.Q. Miller School of Journalism and Mass Communications. Kansas State also hosts a "Huck Boyd Lecture Series," which has brought a number of speakers to the university, including former Illinois Sen. Paul Simon, former presidential press secretary Marlin Fitzwater and noted journalist (and Kansan) Bill Kurtis.

On September 21, 1997, the McDill "Huck" Boyd Community Center was dedicated in Phillipsburg. It is home to the Huck Boyd Foundation, the goal of which is "revitalizing rural America, enhancing its quality of life and preserving America's rural heritage."

== Political influence ==
Boyd was active in Republican politics, twice launching campaigns for governor of Kansas and serving from 1967 to 1987 as a Kansas representative on the Republican National Committee.

Former Kansas senators Robert J. Dole and Pat Roberts have both considered Boyd to be a mentor in their political careers. Boyd maintained considerable influence in the state Republican Party, as he held almost every role within the leadership structure at one time or another, including state president.

Boyd was chairman of media arrangements for the Republican National Conventions in 1968, 1972 and 1976. And, in 1970, he was one of two public members of the United States delegation to the United Nations Economic and Social Council in Geneva, Switzerland.

Boyd also served for a time as a member and the chairman of the Kansas Board of Regents, which oversees operations of the six state-funded, "Regents" universities in the state of Kansas: The University of Kansas at Lawrence; Kansas State University in Manhattan; Fort Hays State University; Emporia State University; Pittsburg State University; and Wichita State University.

== Recognition ==
Boyd was widely known and highly regarded in Kansas both for his journalism career and his involvement in politics and community service. Through the years he received a number of honors, including awards as Kansan of the Year; the first-ever Kansan of the Decade; Distinguished Kansan for Citizenship; Man of the Year for Forestry; and the Kansas State University Alumni Association's Medallion Award.

Boyd also received several significant journalism awards. He was honored with the William Allen White Award for Journalistic Merit, the first Victor Murdock Award for distinction in journalism and community service, and was a recipient of the Eugene Cervi Award from the International Society of Weekly Newspaper Editors for public service through community journalism.

== Death ==
Huck Boyd died January 9, 1987, in Wichita, Kansas. He is buried in Phillipsburg's Fairview Cemetery.
