= Florence Aubenas =

French journalist (born 1961)

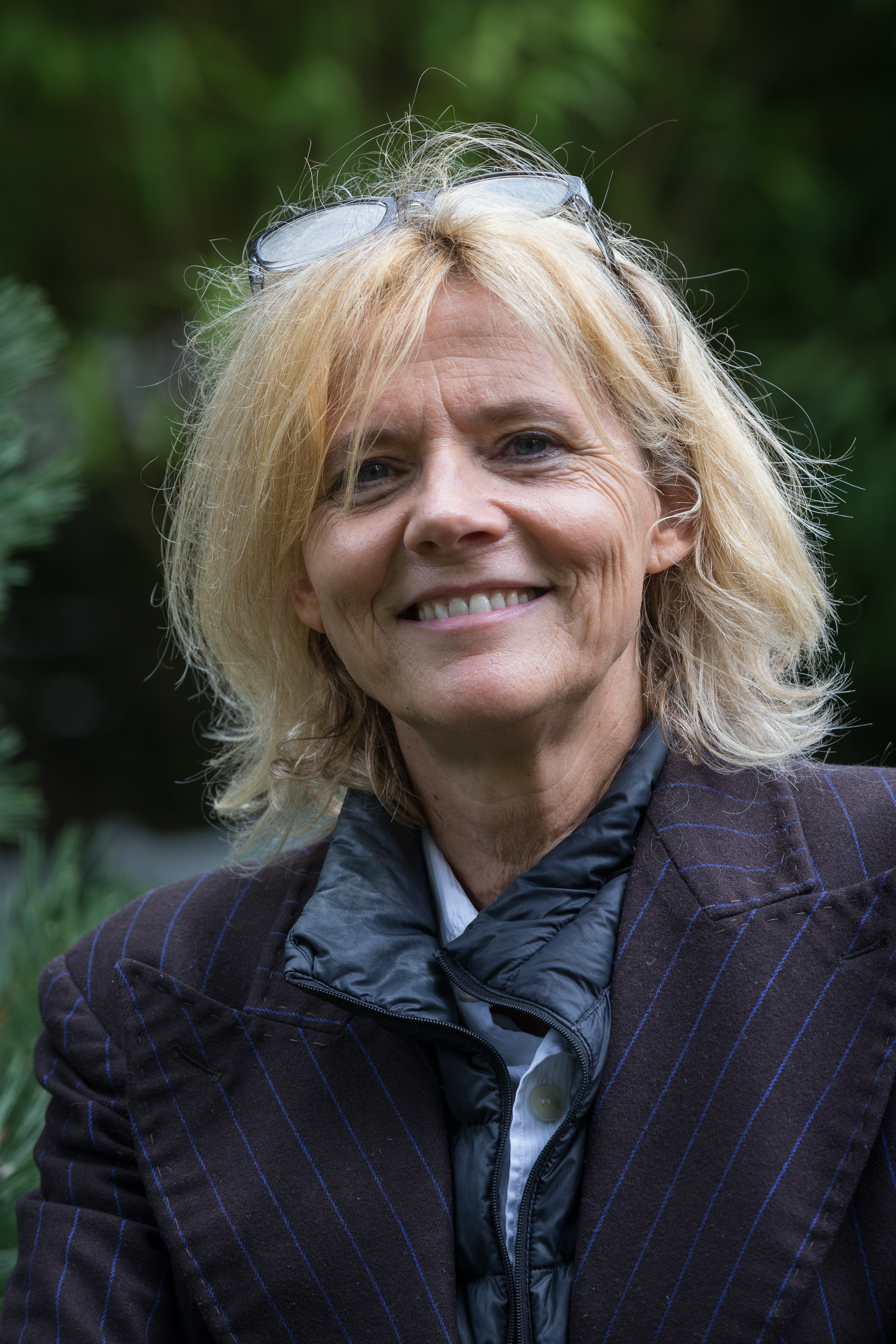
- Florence Aubenas in 2015
- Born: 6 February 1961 (age 65); Brussels, Belgium
- Education: Centre de formation des journalistes
- Occupation: Journalist

Florence Aubenas (born 6 February 1961) is a French journalist.

== Biography ==
She was born in Brussels, 6 February 1961, from French parents and studied journalism at the Centre de Formation des Journalistes in Paris.

She worked as a reporter for Libération, Le Nouvel Observateur and Le Monde, among others. She was kidnapped in 2005 while covering the Iraq war and was held captive for five months. She received the prize "Archivio Disarmo - Golden Doves for Peace" awarded by IRIAD (2005). Her books include Grand Reporter (2009), Le Quai de Ouistreham (2010) and En France (2014). Le Quai de Ouistreham, set in the port of Ouistreham in northern France, won several literary prizes (the Prix Joseph-Kessel, the Globe de Cristal and the Jean Amila-Meckert prize) and has been compared to George Orwell's classic work on the Great Depression, The Road to Wigan Pier.
