= Nichols Hall =

Building at Kansas State University

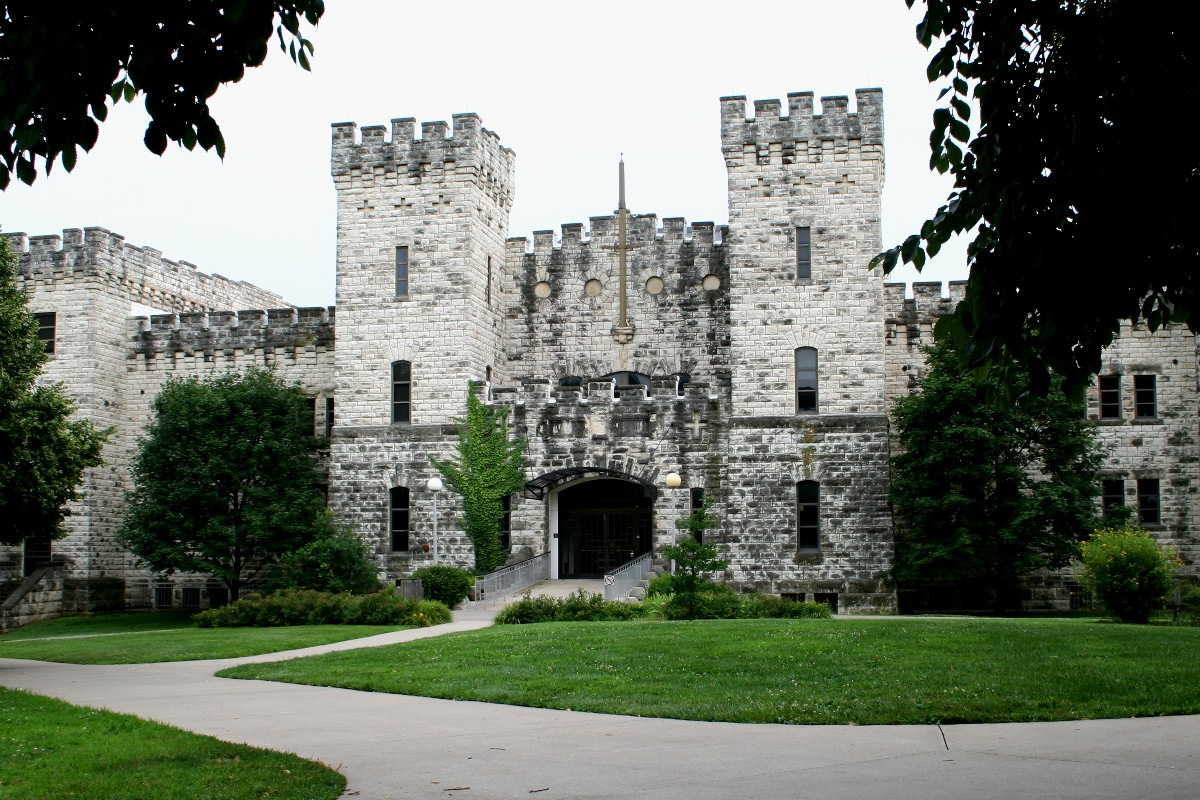
- Nichols Hall, Main Entrance
- Interactive map of the Nichols Hall area
- Former names: Nichols Court

General information
- Type: Academic Building
- Architectural style: Neo-Renaissance
- Location: Kansas State University, Manhattan, Kansas, United States
- Coordinates: 39°11′11.8″N 96°34′50.8″W
- Current tenants: College of Arts and Sciences College of Engineering
- Completed: 1911
- Renovated: 1985
- Destroyed: 1968 (fire)
- Cost: $25,000+

Technical details
- Floor count: 3

Website
- www.k-state.edu/nichols

Nichols Hall is a building on the campus of Kansas State University. This building was originally built in 1911 and appears from the exterior as a castle with battlements. Its interior was destroyed by fire in 1968; the structure was rebuilt in 1985. The building currently houses the A.Q. Miller School of Media and Communication and the School of Music, Theatre, and Dance.

== History ==
At the start of the 20th century, the two major needs of the Kansas State University campus were a livestock pavilion and a gymnasium. The president of the University, E. R. Nichols, lobbied hard for money for these projects, and the gymnasium was christened Nichols Hall in his honor after he retired in 1909.

=== Construction ===
The initial funding and construction of Nichols Hall began during 1910 and was finished in 1911. The initial budget for the construction was $25,197. More money was allocated the following year to finish the building.

Construction of the building included the use of state-of-the-art construction techniques. Nichols Hall was one of the first buildings in the United States to be built using continuously poured concrete flooring. The concrete was mixed using horses.

=== Early uses ===
The building provided a wrestling and basketball gymnasium and contained two swimming pools in the basement. Integration of swimming classes in 1920 ended the segregation of the pools between men and women. The building also housed facilities for physical education (now the Department of Kinesiology) and, until World War II, the Department of Military Science. Additionally, the building was used for commencement ceremonies.

The second educational FM radio station in Kansas, KSDB-FM, began operations in the building in 1949. The initial broadcast power of the station was 10 watts, a level barely sufficient to cover the city of Manhattan.

Due to crowding during basketball games, the university built Ahearn Fieldhouse in 1951 as a venue for basketball and other sporting events, as well as commencements. Some activities of the Music Department were then moved into Nichols Hall, including the storage of musical instruments and sheet music for the marching band. Women's physical education classes also began using the building.

=== The Nichols Hall fire ===
On December 13, 1968, a fire gutted the building. The fire started when an arsonist stacked wooden tables against the front doors of the building, poured gasoline on them, and set them ablaze. The arsonist was never apprehended. Contrary to erroneous information publicized in the years following the fire, Nichols Hall did not house the military science department at the time of the fire. In fact, in 1943, the Department of Military Science had moved out of Nichols Hall and into its present building (then known as the Military Science Building, currently Gen. Richard B. Myers Hall) which is located on the opposite side of campus from Nichols Hall. This move occurred 25 years prior to the 1968 Nichols Hall fire (and more than 20 years before the start of the Vietnam War).

The fire destroyed all of the band instruments and sheet music stored inside the building. By an odd coincidence, the music director, Phil Hewett, happened to have the "Wabash Cannonball" in his briefcase the night of the fire. This was the only music available for the band to play in a game against Syracuse a few nights later. As a result, the song became one of the main fight songs of the university.

The total damage was estimated at $500,000.

=== Rebuilding Nichols Hall ===
The building was completely destroyed, except for the stout stone walls which remained standing empty for more than a decade after the fire. In the Spring of 1979, University President Duane C. Acker announced that he intended to raze the remnants and build a parking lot in its place. Hundreds of students spontaneously gathered in protest outside of President Acker's offices in Anderson Hall. A smaller group of students moved their protest to the halls of the state legislature in Topeka where they managed to get funding for the demolition of the building deleted from the budget and replaced with $10,000 in funding for a rebuilding feasibility study. This organic, grass-roots effort by concerned students, along with the positive results of the feasibility study, convinced the university and the legislature to appropriate approximately $6 million for the project, and restoration efforts began in 1983.

The building was to be rebuilt using the existing walls. However, an engineering inspection determined that the walls were too weak to support the structure. Thus, a new structure was built inside of the existing walls and then attached to them. As a result, the building's exterior walls are nearly three feet thick.

The reconstructed building features a glass topped atrium and contains a modern theater, classrooms, and offices. The building was reopened and rededicated on November 16, 1985. The east wall of the atrium contains a large mural commissioned by Eric Bransby titled Student Achievement. The mural, dedicated on October 10, 1986, depicts the various uses the building has had during its history.

== Nichols Hall today ==
The building has housed the Department of Communication Studies, Theatre, and Dance since it was rebuilt in 1985. The department's main office is located in the building, as well as a number of classrooms, dance studios, and the Mark A. Chapman Theatre. The Department of Computer Science resided in Nichols Hall from 1985 until 2016, when the department relocated to the College of Engineering Phase IV Expansion.
