= Kyoto design declaration =

The Kyoto design declaration was signed in Kyoto, on March 28, 2008 by 124 global members of Cumulus Association formerly Cumulus, the International Association of Universities and Colleges of Art, Design and Media. The declaration was developed to create sustainable designs and human-centered societies, through collaboration of institutions, businesses and individuals.

== Background ==
Cumulus President Emeritus Mr Yrjo Sotamaa (Finnish designer with an MA in Interior Architecture and furniture design) was the author of the design declaration and past president of Cumulus. Yrjo Sotamaa's career was based on building a sustainable future and the importance of art, design and the mythologies of design involved, which enable such creative societies and designs to be developed. The Association Cumulus is the only global association representing education and research in art, design, and media, founded in 1990 by the University of Art and Design Helsinki UIAH, today the School of Arts, Design and Architecture of Aalto University in Finland and Royal College of Art in London UK. Allowing for academic and corporate collaboration. Cumulus has expanded and improved in status over the past decade leading it to become a successful international organization representing a global community of 360 first-class higher education institutions in 66 countries.

== History and the evolution of the design declaration ==
Cumulus was set up in 1990 by the combined efforts of ‘The University of Art and Design Helsinki (UIAH) (currently Aalto University School of Art and Design) and the Royal College of Art in London, collaborating with Danmarks Designskole, Gerrit Rietveld Academie, Universität Gesamthochschule Essen and Hochschule für angewandte Kunst in Wien. The organizations focus is on enhancing academic forward designs and generating creative communities connecting the continents. This is described by the declarations author-Yrjo Sotamaa, as a ‘mission to make societies and industry aware of the importance of culture, art, and design in building sustainable societies, creative economies, innovative regions and a better everyday life for all people.’ (journal article)This attitude is what brought about the declaration and members of Cumulus continue to work by the declarations approach.

== Objectives ==
The Kyoto design declarations main aim is highlighted by their statement of commitment from the members of Cumulus, to act on being globally responsible for building sustainable, human-centered, creative societies. The Kyoto Design Declaration suggests that it is important, globally, to maintain and continue local or traditional practices. Focused on sustainability as a form of collaboration and as a design ethic. Forming relationships from addressed green issues and design proposals. Design thinking is the factor found at the core of the design manifesto. In co-operation with design thinking the importance of cultural traditional values are noted in order for their rejuvenation and focus. The design declaration states that In order to forward the ideals of sustainable development and design issues Members of Cumulus agreed to commit to share and promote their knowledge on sustainable development by upholding a relationship with educational and cultural institutions, companies, government agencies, design and other professional agencies and NGO’S. The Kyoto design declaration is a mark of the shift in movement from materialistic and visible values to a more intellectual and mental approach towards all aspects of design. The declaration describes this as an era of ‘cultural productivity’ and when embedded with cultural influences and sustainable principles there is a great potential for an improved world through design society. Sotamaa delivers the declaration to provide benefits to our global communities in the form of economic, ecological, social and cultural benefits which will endeavor to improve quality of life through design durability.

== Designers Involvement ==
Through notions of the declaration designers are made aware of ecological and social problems in the field of global development and sustainable design. This presents issues to address for design matters of education and research. ‘The declaration challenges design to redefine itself’- Yrjo Sotamma. The implementation of the declaration is clarified and kept up to date through annual sustainability reports available through the Cumulus website. Information includes actions taken by the association regarding the dealings and goals, which are set out in the declaration. There are six subheadings, which outline and shape the declaration. The subheadings divide the declaration into categories for the designers and other professional businesses and institutional collaborations to follow and comprehend. -Proposing new values and new ways of thinking -An era of human centered development -The imperative for designers to assume new roles -Seeking collaboration in forwarding the ideals of sustainable development -From education to global responsibility -The power to make fundamental improvements to our world

== Success and results ==
When signed in 2008 in the same venue as Kyoto Protocol in 2002 by the 124 global members of Cumulus including the executive Board of Cumulus, President Christian Guellerin, Past President Yrjö Sotamaa, Rector Kan Shimamoto, Kyoto Seika University, and Industrial Designer Takuo Hirano from Japan. The Declaration also received support from ICISID, BEDA, AIGA and EIDD. four major international organizations, who still support and encourage the declaration and its design concepts.

A direct result from the Kyoto Design Declaration is Cumulus GREEN. It is a mechnanism for accelerating the impact of the declaration. It is through this award that Cumulus is able to take action of the goals and aims stated in the design document. The projects intentions are to induce a response to design issues on sustainable societies through research and design projects. Design competitions are an example of how the declaration is put into place. This is through design competitions that question and discuss the current design issues to do with sustainability. Enforcing designers, students and corporate professionals to follow the guidelines of the Kyoto Design Declaration enhancing their knowledge on the declarations main statement of building sustainable, human-centered, creative societies. Cumulus organises biannually Cumulus GREEN as competition, its latest version in 2022 was about Nurturing the Planet - https://cumulusgreen.org/. GREEN can also be e.g. an award for the best academic paper in Cumulus conferences.

The Kyoto design declaration is seen as influential to many realms and institutions of design. Examples are seen across the globe. Helsinki is the origin of the Cumulus secretariat. The University of Art and Design Helsinki (TAIK) pioneered in the development of the Kyoto declaration, committing to educate sustainable issues. In order to create a successful global community the Mayor of Helsinki, (Jussi Pajunen) stated in his World Design Capital 2012 application that his city will use all means presented by design- in the spirit of the Kyoto Declaration. The Kyoto design declaration will be considered a part of design history in regards to national global mapping. Organizations such as ICSID who support the declaration are also involved in connecting memberships across the continents, leaving an impact on millions of designers throughout the world.
