= François Hurtaud =

French industrial designer

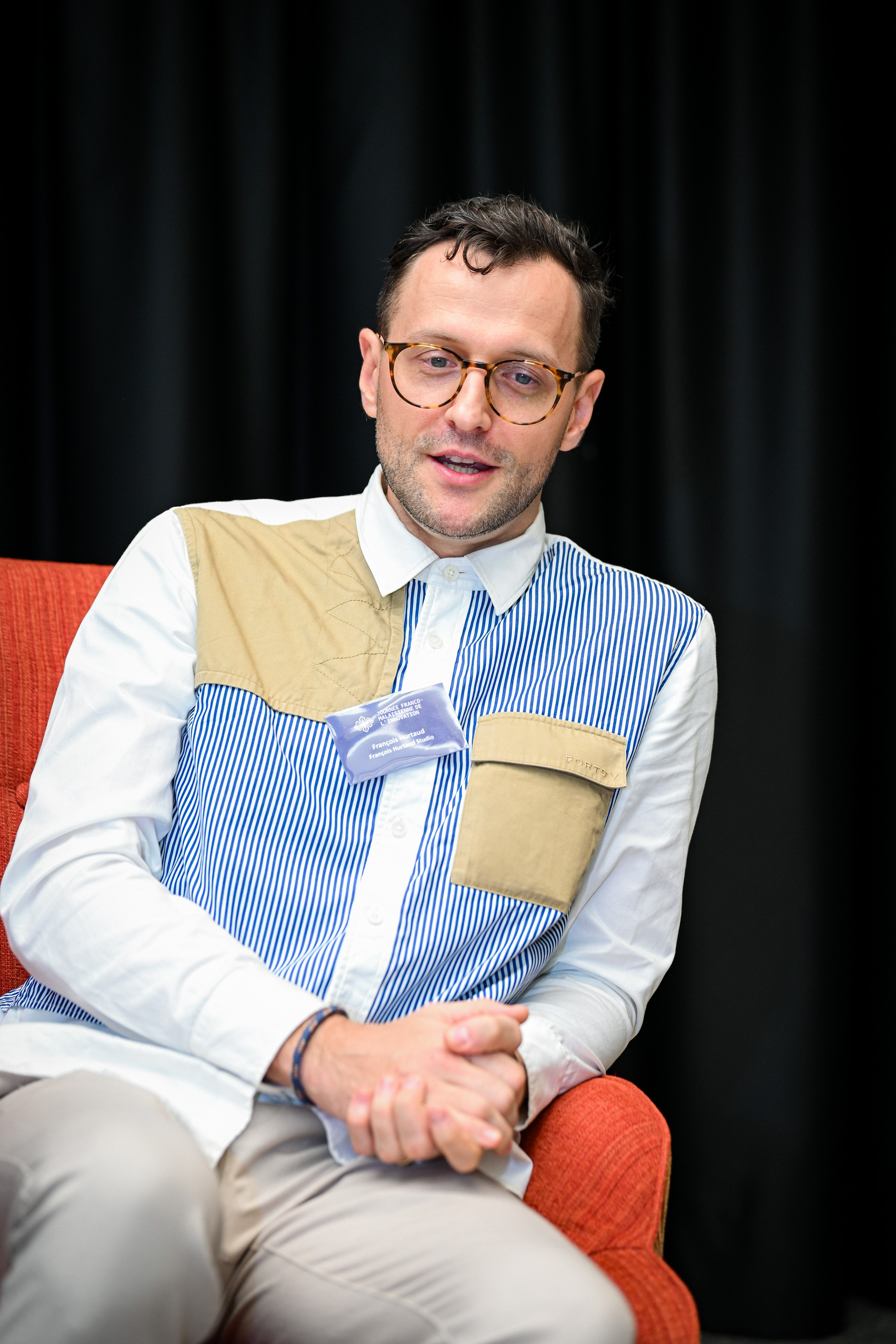
- Occupations: Industrial Designer, Inventor
- Known for: MYKU, EVA, The Mendel Project
- Website: https://www.francoishurtaud.com/

François Louis Édouard Hurtaud (born 1988) is a French industrial designer. He is known for product design and furniture in Hong Kong and Kuala Lumpur. He has co-founded stone-dial watch brand MYKU. He also created the concept of modular Aquaponics furniture called EVA.

== Early life and career ==
François Hurtaud was born in 1988 in Brittany, France. He graduated from L' École de design Nantes Atlantique in 2008.

Hurtaud began his career in 2008 as a product designer. In 2015, he co-founded MYKU with a Singaporean entrepreneur Kuan Teo. It is a stone-dial watch brand that used semi-precious natureal stones.

In 2020, François came up with the idea of indoor aquaponics furniture system and named it EVA. In 2021, he collaborated with AJING on The Mendel Project, a sculptural series inspired by botanical structures and liquid metal finishes.

== Awards and recognition ==
In 2013, Hurtaud received Red Dot Design Award and Good Design Award for Qamini pocket wireless charger. In 2017, A' Design Award recognized him in multiple categories.

The Mendel Project won European Product Design Award in 2018. He won SIT Furniture Design Award for his project EVA for sustainable design in 2020.

In 2022, Hurtaud won Hong Kong Smart Design Award for SeaDifferently.

== Patent ==
US Granted 11337386, François Hurtaud, "Indoor aquaponics assembly", published 24-05-2022, issued 24-05-2022
