= Cumulus Association =

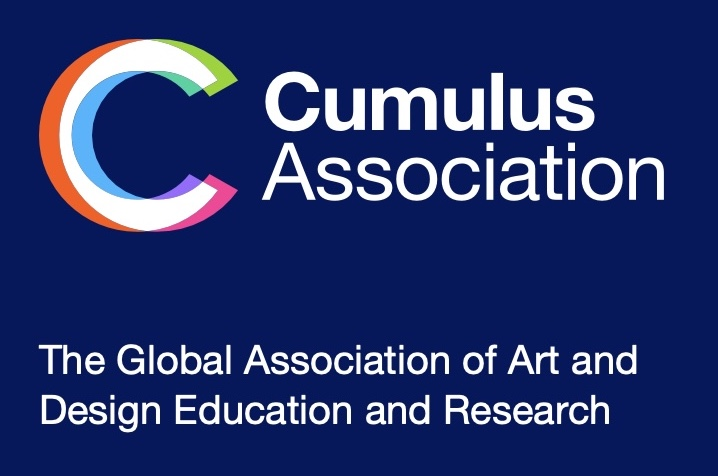

The Cumulus Association is a global association of higher education institutions in the fields of art, design, and media. Currently, there are 399 members from 71 countries.

Cumulus was founded in 1990 by the Aalto University School of Arts, Design and Architecture in Finland and the Royal College of Art in London in cooperation with the Danish Design School, Gerrit Rietvelt Academy, University of Duisburg-Essen and University of Applied Arts Vienna. The network was established to coordinate collaboration between schools, and to facilitate student and teacher exchange within the European Union Erasmus programme. The network was transferred to Cumulus Association in 2001.

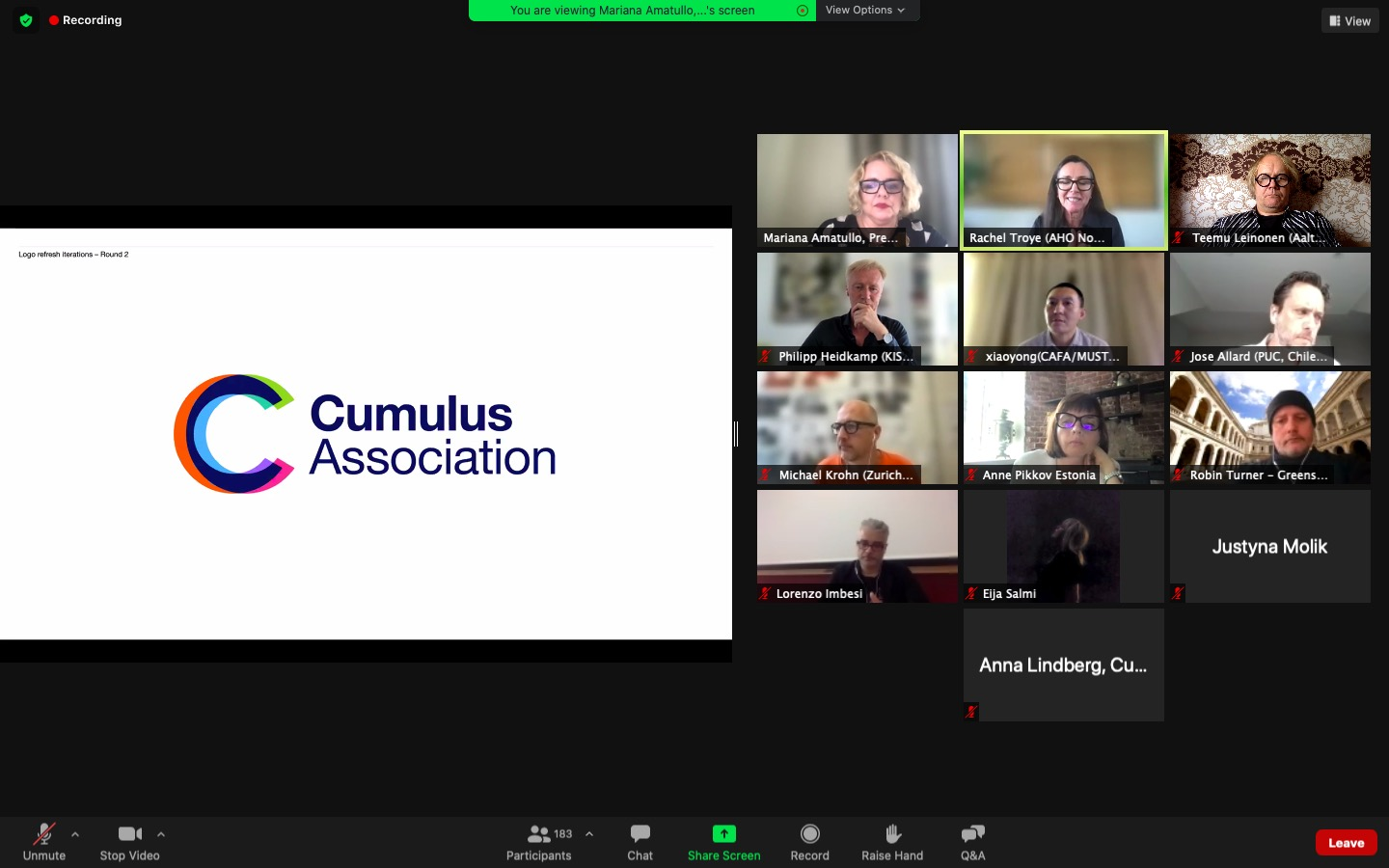
Cumulus Association General Assembly online 10.6.2021. The Board and 170 representatives of the member schools.

The association organizes biannual conferences and initiates projects and workshops with member institutions. Their aim is to improve the quality of art, design, and media education and to help students, professors, and other faculty members work internationally. In addition to academic collaboration, Cumulus facilitates collaboration with businesses, public institutions, and governments with an interest in art and design education and research.

Representatives from Cumulus signed the Kyoto Design Declaration in March 2008. The Cumulus Green Award was established soon after in support of the Declaration. Cumulus Green is an international award focused on cultivating and leading global cultures, societies, and industries towards more ecological and responsible solutions.
