= Christian Guellerin =

Christian Guellerin (born August 9, 1961 in France) is the Executive Director of L'École de design Nantes Atlantique, an institution of higher education in design, and Honorary President of Cumulus, the International Association of Schools of Art, Design & Media. He is also President of France Design Éducation and Honorary Consul of the Republic of Estonia for the West of France since 2009. In 2016, he was appointed Knight of the National Order of Merit.

== Biography ==
After an MBA at the IUA of San Francisco, he started working in 1985 in the United States as Assistant to the Senior Vice President of the FGS Group in New York (United States). He joined the Chamber of Commerce and Industry of Nantes (France) in 1987 at the Institute of Commercial Practice. During this time, he presided the “Business and Trade Schools” network from 1993 to 1994. In 1994, he starts working at the Development and Organization section in charge of professional training for the Chamber of Commerce of Nantes St-Nazaire. He has been the Executive Director of L'École de design Nantes Atlantique since 1997.

Alongside this function, Guellerin has regularly taught courses and given academic lectures. He taught public accounting from 1987 to 1994 at the University of Paris VIII, and financial analysis from 1995 to 1998 at Paris Dauphine University. He also taught courses in management and motivation from 2003 to 2005 at the Catholic University of Angers.

Guellerin was a consultant for various institutions between 2003 and 2011. He worked as an expert for the European Union to create a design centre in Gaziantep (Turkey) in 2003. In 2005, he worked as an expert for the CREPUQ (Conference of Rectors and Principals of Quebec Universities) to set up a master's programme in design for Laval University (Montreal, Canada). He was also a member of the jury for the Design Eleven contest, which was launched in 2010 by the (EESC) to prepare the "European Year of Active Ageing and Intergenerational Solidarity."

He was President of Cumulus, the International Association of Universities and Colleges of Art, Design and Media from 2007 to 2013. This global association gathers 189 members from 46 countries. Created 20 years ago, Cumulus is now the largest international network dedicated solely to issues of design education, with 3,100,000 students and nearly 30,000 teachers. The objective of this association is to exchange best practices concerning design education, creation and innovation. Under the presidency of Guellerin, Cumulus has known significant growth, going from 80 to 178 members, particularly in countries outside Europe. During his mandate, Guellerin signed in 2008 in Japan the "Kyoto Design Declaration" which reflects the new responsibilities of designers towards the challenges of sustainable development. He was re-elected in 2010 for a second term, which ended in 2013, he is now Honorary President. Since July 2018, Guellerin is the Honorary President of the Chinese French designer's association.

Since 1997, Guellerin has been the Executive Director of L'École de design Nantes Atlantique, a private institution for higher education in design which was founded in 1988. Supported by the Chamber of Commerce and Industry of Nantes St-Nazaire, the school has campuses in Nantes (France), Shanghai (China) and Bangalore New Delhi (2014-2018). In 2018, the settlement of the students of L'École de design in Pune (India) is linked to the partnership with the M.I.T. University. Since 2018, São Paulo (Brazil) and Montreal (Quebec). The institution has developed significantly under his leadership, striving towards the professionalization of design studies and establishing relationships with businesses.

A few of the most significant steps in this development of L'École de design are: the opening of a Hypermedia section dedicated to digital products and services, in 2000, the granting of an official accreditation from the French Ministry of Higher Education in 2002 for its master's degree in Design, the opening of a spatial design section in 2005, the creation of an Apprentice Training Centre (CFA) specialized in “Industrial Creation and Innovation” in 2006, the setting up of the school's China campus in 2008 initially in Qingdao (China), and now in Shanghai (China), the launching of a graphic design option and the reorganization of the master's programs into social and economical themes in 2009. An exchange program was created in Bangalore (India), in 2010, and the opening in 2011 of an experimental laboratory named READi Design Lab dedicated to interaction design. In 2019, the opening of the "Human Machine Design Lab", will accompany the technological progress since the first “hypermedia”: technologies for speech recognition (and synthesis), images, Big Data mining and exploitation, Artificial Intelligence, robotics, Virtual, Augmented and Mixed Realities.

Guellerin has written numerous articles about design and education. Guellerin is also the Honorary Consul of Estonia in France. In November 2016, Guellerin was appointed Knight of the National Order of Merit.

== Publications and lectures ==
=== International lectures and research ===
- For a more sustainable world: How design will replace Marketing to move from consumption to responsible contribution. The 2020 ADIM International Academic Exchange, Tsinghua Arts and Design Institute, Milano and Beijing - June 2020
- Emergence of an ecological consciousness: towards new industrial paradigms, Plastic recycling Conference, Brussels - November 2019
- What will being Human mean when robots will have outsmarted us?, Rencontres Annuelles Internationales du Design - ESSTED - Tunis - April 2019
- Strategic transformation through design, Paris Design Summit, France - February 2019
- Intangible value creation through design - a key success factor for Europe - Organiser: Bureau of European Design Associations (BEDA), Industry Days, Brussels - February 2019
- What will being Human mean when robots outsmart us?, TEDx CAD Brussels - Creativity is Power - Belgium - November 10, 2018

  https://www.youtube.com/watch?v=eYckzxqHtEU - https://www.flickr.com/photos/tedxcadbrussels/albums/72157700575995082 - http://blogs.lecolededesign.com/christianguellerin/2018/11/26/what-will-being-human-mean-when-robots-outsmart-us/?lang=en

- International Days for Deans and Design Experts, ELISAVA, Barcelona School of Design and Engineering, Spain - April 2018
- Design schools: from creation to management, World Design Summit, Montréal (Quebec) - October 2017
- Schools of design: the new frontiers to invent the world of tomorrow: What responsibilities have designers and design schools…, Donghua University, College of Fashion and Innovation, Shanghai (China) - September 2017
- Design and sustainable cities, L.O.U.CO (Porto Digital), Recife (Brazil) - August 2017
- Design and innovation, L.O.U.CO (Porto Digital), Recife (Brazil) - August 2017
- Design schools: the new incubators for a new entrepreneurship, UNICAP, Catholic University of Pernambuco, Recife (Brazil) - Août 2017
- Design & innovation, Riga Technical University, Riga (Latvia) - April 2017
- Design & innovation, Peter the Great St. Petersburg Polytechnic University Computer-Aided Engineering Centre of Excellence, Russia - October 2016
- Design: new paradigms for new services, First Ordos International creativity and culture conference, Ordos (China) - August 2016
- Design schools: the new incubators for a new entrepreneuriat, Elisava (Barcelona School of Design and Engineering), Barcelona (Spain) - May 2016
- Design schools: the new incubators for a new entrepreneurship, ESDI (Escola Superior de Disseny), Barcelona (Spain) - May 2016
- Design and entrepreneurship, CAFA (China Central Academy of Fine Arts), Beijing (China) - March 2016
- Design and sustainable cities, Tsinghua University, Beijing (China) - March 2016
- Design and innovation as an answer to a disrupted world, French Consulate, Shanghai (China) - November 2015
- Design schools: the new incubators for a new entrepreneurship, UNESP, São Paulo (Brazil) - May 2015
- Design for innovation, SENAI, São Paulo (Brazil) - May 2015
- Design : new incubators for a new entrepreneurship, College of Advertising and Design, Brussels (Belgium) - May 2015
- Round Table, European Academy of Design, CCI de Paris (France) - April 2015
- Round Table, UTSEUS Innovation Week, Shanghai (China), October 2014
- Designing Designers, Academy of Fine Arts in Kraków, Cracovie (Poland), October 2014
- 7° culturas da inovaçao, Porto Alegre (Brazil), August 2014
- Design schools: the new incubators for a new entrepreneurship, Université Polytechnique de Hubei, Wuhan (China), May 2014
- From creation to innovation, from innovation to entrepreneurship, Guadalajara (Mexico), February 2014
- Creation in Asia, Maison & Objet, Paris (France), January 2014
- Design schools: the new incubators for a new entrepreneurship, Jinan (China), October 2013
- Design, new industrial paradigms and 3D printing - 10th Anniversary Office Harmonization Internal Market - European Union - Alicante (Spain), April 2013
- Design schools, for a new entrepreneurship, Conference Cumulus, Santiago (Chile), November 2012
- Cumulus, a platform for global collaboration, Design of Designers, Cumulus Lab, Shanghai (China), September 14, 2012
- From Creation to Innovation, how schools of design work with and for companies : the example of « L’École de design Nantes Atlantique » in Shanghai, Design of Designers, Shanghai World Expo Exhibition and Convention Center, Shanghai (China), September 12, 2012
- Innovative strategies, New Research & Innovation Horizons workshop, Lappeenranta University of Technology, Lappeenranta (Finland), June 13, 2012
- Designing the future, Cumulus conference opening speech, Aalto University School of Arts, Design and Architecture, Helsinki (Finlande), May 24, 2012
- How can creativity change your work environment ?, Montreal Networking Forum, Paris (France), April 25, 2012
- Design Schools: From Innovation to a New Entrepreneurship, Cumulus conference, Rocky Mountain College of Art + Design, Denver, Colorado (United States), September 29, 2011
- 3 Ideas to Emphasise the Role of Design, China Campus #01 exhibition, University of Shanghai (China), September 12, 2011.
- Design: a Strategy for New Industrial Paradigms, Design For All Europe conference (EIDD), Tallinn (Estonia), May 28, 2011.
- Design and Globalization, a Friendly Design Context for a Strategic Discipline, 2nd EU-Russia Innovation Forum, Lappeenranta (Finland), May 25, 2011.
- The Credibility Condition to Ensuring Recognition in Design, 1st International Symposium for Design Education Researchers, Cumulus and Design Research Society, Paris (France), May 18, 2011.
- Design and Identity, Mission Design, Montreal (Canada), May 10, 2011.
- Useful and Futile, 5th International Conference, Design principles and practices, University La Sapienza, Rome (Italy), February 3, 2011.
- Research in Design, on Design... , Swinburne University of Technology and RMIT University, Melbourne (Australia), November 14, 2009.
- What Happens to Designers 10 Years Down the Line ?; Designer after school, European Creativity Conference, 7th edition of the Roma Design + Week, La Sapienza, Rome (Italy), December 11, 2009.
- Design Education, the New Deal, IASDR (International Association of Societies of Design Research), Seoul (South Korea), October 20, 2009.
- Design and identity, Cumulus conference opening speech, Academy of Fine Arts and Design, Bratislava (Czech Republic), October 13, 2007.
- What Future for Design Education, Research Symposium, University of Valencia (Spain), 2006
- Design, Ethics and Humanism, Eastman IDSA National Education Conference, Art Center College of Design, Pasadena, California (United States), October 24 to 26, 2004
- What is the Role of a Design School? , Cumulus conference, Istituto Europeo di Design Milan, Colle di Val d’Elsa (Italy), 2002

=== Professional lectures ===
- Design. A strategical and managerial discipline at the service of innovation, Economical Forum (7th edition), French Polynesia Government, Papeete, January 2020
- To do something else that what we are capable to do, Business Club, Vendee (France), October 2019
- Design or the opportunity to do otherwise to switch to innovation mode, Business Club, Sarthe (France), June 2019
- Design and innovation management, Shenzhen R & D Club, audience: French companies, in collaboration with The French Chamber of Commerce and Industry South China - March 2019
- Design, a strategic management discipline, CIC Innovation Factory, Nantes - February 2019
- Design and innovation, Arkea, Brest (France) - November 2018
- Societal issues and contributions from design, Conseil Départemental du Val d'Oise, Cergy (France) - March 2018
- Design, Making man central again, Maïf insurances, Tours (France) - October 2017
- Design and innovation, Jules Verne University, Polytech, Nantes (France) - July 2017
- Service design, IMA Technologies Event: "La machine à innover", Nantes (France) - July 2017
- Innovation except R&D, Round table "Innovation, make different", Plein Air - Chamber of Commerce and Industry Ille-et-Vilaine, Rennes (France) - June 2017
- Design & innovation, Harmonie Mutuelle, Paris (France) - June 2017
- Design thinking, the sink of creativity and innovation, Chamber of Commerce and Industry France, Paris (France) - March 2017
- Design schools – Partnerships with industrial companies, double degrees and international opening: Success receipts, Web in Lorient, édition 2016, Lorient (France) - November 2016
- Design: a strategic branch for new industrial paradigms, Maïf insurances Innovation Day, Paris (France), November 2016
- Did transversality and hybridisation first French experimentation bear fruit?, Colloque AEF – Arts, Design et Mode, Paris (France) - October 2016
- Design, a discipline of project management, MFQM (Mouvement Français Qualité et Management), Carquefou (France) - June 2016
- Design, a discipline of project management, Maïf insurances, Niort (France) - June 2016
- Crisis forces and allows, Centre des Jeunes Dirigeants d'Entreprise, Lamballe (France) - June 2014
- Design and Corporate Social Responsibility, Conference DRO (Dirigeants Responsables de l'Ouest), Nantes (France) - May 2014
- Management convention, La Poste, Nantes (France) - April 2014
- Design, Innovation and competitivity : do we have to change of industrial model?, Salon de l'Industrie, Nantes (France) - March 2014
- Design, Creation, Innovation for business and society, Formathèque, Nantes (France) - January 2014
- Design: a strategic branch in the company for its durability, Institut Kervegan, Nantes (France) - October 2013
- What Future for Design Education?, Mission Design, Université de Montréal (Canada), January 26, 2012
- From "Made in" to "Designed by", University of Vendean entrepreneurs, Vendée MEDEF, La Roche-sur-Yon (France), January 13, 2012
- Design, Carrying Meaning and Spirituality, University of Strasbourg (France), November 9, 2011
- Favorable Conditions for Design, Creation and Innovation, Chamber of Commerce and Industry of the Landes, Mont-de-Marsan (France), October 7, 2011
- Design and Innovation, for which Changes?, Banque Populaire Bretagne Atlantique, September 29, 2011

=== International publications ===
Cumulus Assets of Vitality, Pertinence, Influence and Responsibility, Cumulus Working Papers Saint-Etienne, Publication Series G, Aalto University, School of Art and Design, Helsinki (Finland), 2009

Cumulus Reservations to Promote Ideals of Democracy, Freedom and Exchange, Cumulus Working Papers Bratislava, Publication Series G, Aalto University, School of Art and Design, Helsinki (Finland), 2008

Japan - Modernity with Finess, Strength and Beauty of Traditions, Cumulus Working Papers Kyoto, Publication Series G, Aalto University, School of Art and Design, Helsinki (Finlande), 2008

=== International magazines ===
Why Design Offers a Great Opportunity for Companies to Work on their Ethics, publication by Design for All Institute of India, vol 5, n° 1, p. 29-42, New Delhi (India), January 2010

Education and Design: A New Deal, magazine Disegno Industriale, n° 42-43, p. 20-25, Italy, 2010

Design, a Strategic Factor Linked to Major Socio-Economic Issues, publication by Design for All Institute of India, vol 4, n° 9, p. 20-25, New Delhi (India), September 2009

=== Publications ===
Christian Guellerin, Nicolas Minvielle, Marie de Jacquelot, Designer: Careers and Professionalism, French and English bilingual edition, De Boeck editions. Design & Innovation, 2010, 325 p.
