= Craig Bolerjack =

American sportscaster (born 1958)

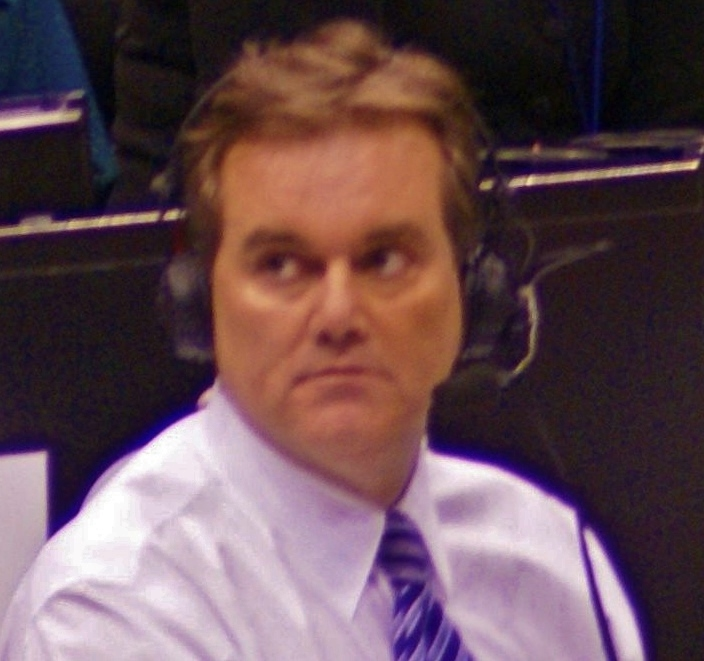
- Bolerjack in 2009
- Born: May 16, 1958 (age 68); Willow Springs, Missouri, U.S.
- Education: Kansas State University
- Occupation: Sportscaster

Kyle Craig Bolerjack (born May 16, 1958) is an American sportscaster who is calling Utah Jazz telecasts on KJZZ with Thurl Bailey. He has also called games for CBS, ESPN, and CBS College Sports Network in a national broadcasting career that dates back to the late 1990s.

== Biography ==
Born in Willow Springs, Missouri, Bolerjack graduated from Shawnee Mission Northwest High School in Shawnee Mission, Kansas. He enrolled at Kansas State University and walked on to the Kansas State Wildcats football team as a linebacker, but left the team after fall camp due to an ACL injury. While attending college, he worked as sports director for the campus radio station KSDB. Bolerjack is also an alumnus member of Delta Upsilon Kansas State chapter. He began his television broadcast career as a weekend sports anchor for KTSB-TV Topeka (now KSNT) before moving to Salt Lake City, Utah to work as sports anchor at KSL-TV, which included play-by-play announcing of BYU football and basketball broadcasts on the network.

He and Steve Beuerlein were the secondary college football broadcast team for CBS Sports. They were on the air when two games were scheduled on the network on the same day. He also was a reserve broadcaster for the NFL on CBS. In 2006, Bolerjack filled in for Bill Macatee, who was on assignment for PGA Tour Merrill Lynch Shootout, on the Houston Texans-Jacksonville Jaguars matchup with Rich Baldinger. And, in 2007, he filled in for Greg Gumbel, who was filling in for an ill James Brown, on the Cleveland Browns-Arizona Cardinals matchup with Dan Dierdorf. He also worked with Todd Blackledge, Mike Mayock, and FOX colleague Daryl Johnston.

Bolerjack had also called games in the NCAA basketball tournament since 2000. During the 2001 tournament, he called the four first-round games in Boise, Idaho, where all of them were decided by three points or fewer, including 15-seed Hampton's upset of second-seeded Iowa State.

Bolerjack called Pac-12 games on Fox Sports Net with Joel Klatt and Petros Papadakis in 2011 and continues to perform the same role for FX and Fox College Football, along with CBS and Fox colleague Gus Johnson. In 2011, Bolerjack filled in for Dick Stockton in the NFL on Fox TV broadcast booth for the week 4 matchup between the Atlanta Falcons and Seattle Seahawks with John Lynch. He was also the preseason voice of the Miami Dolphins until he was replaced by Stockton.

In addition to his other work, Bolerjack is the voice of the Utah Jazz. He replaced "Hot Rod" Hundley on the television broadcasts during the 2005–06 NBA season. (Hundley continued to announce on the radio, but announced his retirement after the 2008–09 NBA season.) He initially ran the broadcast with color commentator and ABA legend Ron Boone. Former Jazz forward Matt Harpring joined the broadcast starting in the 2010–2011 season, when Boone moved over to the radio broadcasts. Since the start of the 2021–2022 season, the broadcast team has featured a trio of Bolerjack, former Jazz star Thurl Bailey, and veteran reporter and Utah native Holly Rowe.

Bolerjack lives in Sandy, Utah with his wife, Sharon, and his three children.
