= Accredited diploma (France) =

Accredited Diploma
- Acronym: Visa, Diplovis
- Type: Undergraduate or graduate degree
- Duration: One to three years
- Regions: France

In France, an Accredited Diploma (Diplovis) (in French: "Diplôme Visé") is a national higher education diploma delivered by public or private Grandes Écoles and colleges (écoles supérieures) and not necessarily linked to a university degree. For certain Grandes Écoles or colleges, it may also be accompanied by a bachelor's or master's degree, adding further recognition.

It is one of the two diplomas delivered by the Grandes Écoles, along with the Engineer's Diploma and a type of diploma awarded following an evaluation procedure by the French Ministry of Higher Education and Research, judging the academic quality of the Grande École or college program.

== Definition ==
This visa from the French Ministry of Higher Education, Research and Innovation is state recognition of specific training. Accredited colleges and programs are subject to continuous pedagogical control. Program content, admissions panels and diploma-awarding commissions are reviewed by the French government. Accreditation is granted by decree of the French Ministry of Higher Education, Research and Innovation, for a maximum renewable period of 6 years.

== Conditions for awarding and renewing accreditation ==
Higher education institutions applying for an accreditation must be recognized by the French state. Renewal applications are examined and evaluated by the Haut Conseil de l'évaluation de la recherche et de l'enseignement supérieur (HCÉRES), with the exception of business schools, which are evaluated by the Commission d'évaluation des formations et de diplômes de gestion (CEFDG).

Approximately 120 Bachelor's to Master's level courses in France have this accreditation, for a duration of 1 to 6 years.

== See also ==
- Répertoire National des Certifications Professionnelles (RNCP)
- Titre (degree)
