= France Compétences =

France Competences Agency
- France Compétences

Agency overview
- Formed: September 5, 2018
- Jurisdiction: Government of France
- Headquarters: 11, rue Scribe, Paris
- Agency executive: Stéphane Lardy, Director
- Parent department: Minister of Labour, Employment and Economic Inclusion
- Website: www.francecompetences.fr

France Compétences is the French national authority responsible for financing and regulation of vocational training and apprenticeships.

The agency is the result of the merger in 2018 of the Commission nationale de la certification professionnelle (CNCP) and several bodies that shared governance of vocational training: the Conseil national de l'emploi, de la formation et de l'orientation professionnelles (CNEFOP), a quadripartite body, and two joint bodies, the Comité paritaire interprofessionnel national pour l'emploi et la formation (COPANEF) and the Fonds paritaire de sécurisation des parcours professionnels (FPSPP).

== Missions ==
=== Control of vocational diplomas and certifications ===
The Commission de la certification professionnelle of France Compétences (English: Vocational Certification Commission), previously the Commission nationale de la certification professionnelle (CNCP, in English: National Commission for Vocational Certification) is an internal body of France Compétences, which examines applications for registration in the Répertoire national des certifications professionnelles (RNCP) from private bodies and the social partners, thereby helping to regulate the vocational training system, and a former French inter-ministerial commission, interprofessional and interagency.

It has been created by the social modernization law (No. 2002-73). It is under the authority of the Minister responsible for vocational training. It is composed of sixteen departmental officials, ten social partners, three elected representatives of chambers, three elected representatives of regions and twelve qualified persons. These commissioners are appointed by order of the Prime Minister for a period of five years renewable. It replaces the Commission technique d’homologation des titres et diplômes de l’enseignement technologique (Technical Commission for approval of foreign education qualifications technological).

The commission has several missions:

- Identify the supply of vocational qualifications (Répertoire national des certifications professionnelles),
- Process applications for registration and to update the répertoire national des certifications professionnelles (RNCP, in English National Repertory of Vocational Certifications),
- Ensure the renewal and adaptation of degrees and titles, to monitor the qualifications and work organization,
- Make recommendations to the attention of institutions delivering professional certifications or certificates of qualification.

The Commission de la certification professionnelle is based on the work of a specialized committee, a permanent secretariat and a network of regional correspondents. It contributes to the international work the transparency of qualifications.

=== Financing vocational training ===
France Compétences is responsible for the distribution and payment of mutualised funds for vocational training and apprenticeship. It disburses funds to skills operators for additional financing of apprenticeship and professionalisation contracts and retraining or promotion through work-linked training.

== See also ==
- Commission des Titres d'Ingénieur (CTI)
- Conférence des Directeurs des Écoles Françaises d'Ingénieurs (CDEFI)
- Conférence des Grandes Écoles (CGE)
- Education in France
