= A.Q. Miller School of Media and Communication =

School at Kansas State University

Coordinates: 39°11′16.24″N 96°34′53.54″W

- Former names: Department of Industrial Journalism established at Kansas State Agricultural College; Department of Industrial Journalism and Printing; Department of Technical Journalism; Department of Journalism; Department of Journalism and Mass Communications;
- Type: Public higher education
- Established: 1910
- Affiliations: Kansas State University Kansas State University College of Arts & Sciences
- Director: Dr. Heather Woods
- Location: Manhattan, Kansas
- Website: www.k-state.edu/media-communication/

The A.Q. Miller School of Media and Communication is a school of Kansas State University.

== History ==
Kansas State University offered printing classes in 1874 using a sheet-fed press in the basement of Kedzie Hall, the stately limestone building that houses the storied School, making it the first American university to offer a program in newspaper printing.

In 1910, Kansas State became the second university in the United States to offer a journalism program (after the University of Missouri, 1908) upon the hiring of Charles J. Dillon, a journalist of The Kansas City Star who set up its journalism curriculum. Dillon's curriculum, titled "industrial journalism," required students to take courses in home economics, agriculture, and engineering, in addition to reporting and copy editing. As the scope of the curriculum and its disciplines expanded, "mass communications" was added to the School name in 1971. In 2022 the School of Journalism and Mass Communication merged with the Department of Communication Studies to become the A.Q. Miller School of Media and Communication.

The School is named for distinguished Kansas publisher and editor Alexander Quintella Miller Sr. (b., February 7, 1874; d., December 29, 1959), whose son, Carl Miller, a Kansas State alumnus, made a financial gift in 1987.

For more than 50 years, the school published The Belleville Telescope, a weekly newspaper established 1870 in Belleville, Kansas, the seat of Republic County. He took his first job as a newspaperman at age 17 as a printer's devil with the Clifton News, a daily newspaper published 1889–1923 in Washington and Clay counties of northern Kansas. About his first job, he was quoted to state: "When I first went to work for the Clifton News, I hadn't the vaguest idea what a printer's devil did. I soon found out. My first assigned task was to mail the single wrappers, individual copies of the newspaper. Flour paste was mixed and used to seal the wrappers. I can still vividly recall the odor exuding from the unused paste after the job was completing. The shop took on all the fragrance of a [meat-]packing plant."

From September 2 to September 4, 2010, faculty, staff, students, and alumni of the school celebrated its centennial. Events included the 11th annual Huck Boyd Lecture in Community Media, which was presented by broadcast journalist and K-State alumna Gail Pennybacker, an A.Q. Miller School memorabilia room at the Kansas State University Student Union, a panel on photojournalism, a banquet, and more. Throughout the celebration, the school raised money for the Dave MacFarland Tools for Tomorrow Technology Fund, which was created to provide media technology for journalism students.

== Notable alumni ==
- Daniel Biles, '74, justice at the Kansas Supreme Court
- Craig Bolerjack, '81, voice of the Utah Jazz
- Scott Kraft, '77, managing editor of the Los Angeles Times
- Steve Physioc, voice of the Kansas City Royals
- Pete Souza, Chief White House Photographer
