= Répertoire national des certifications professionnelles =

In France, the Répertoire national des certifications professionnelles (RNCP) (in English: National Professional Qualifications Register) has been created by article L. 335-6 of the Code de l'éducation (Education Code).

The répertoire national des certifications professionnelles has for purpose to make available to individuals and businesses constantly update information on educational degrees and certificates on the lists established by the commissions paritaires nationales de l'emploi des branches professionnelles (national commissions). It helps to facilitate access to employment, human resources management and mobility.

Certifications stored in the directory are recognized throughout the country.

Registration in the national directory is only for the certification itself.

Under the authority of the Minister for Vocational Training, France Compétences (formerly the Commission nationale de la certification professionnelle), the national authority for the financing and regulation of vocational training and apprenticeship, establishes and updates the répertoire national des certifications professionnelles. It ensures the renewal and adaptation of titres and diplomas.

Degrees are classified in the répertoire national des certifications professionnelles by field of activity and level. For this criterion, until the adoption of the new classification referred to in article 8 of decree of 26 April 2002 referred to above, diplomas are classified according to the National Classification of Levels of Training approved by decision of the permanent group of vocational training and social advancement.

== Professional fields ==
- Personal services to people
- Personal services to businesses and communities
- Public safety personnel
- Administrative staff
- Personal services business
- Staff of the hotel
- Catering staff
- Staff cafe, bar and brasserie
- Staff distribution
- For Sales
- Staff sales force
- Arts professionals
- Entertainers
- Professional training
- Professionals in the social and cultural intervention
- Professionals in the socio-economic intervention
- Allied health professionals
- Medico-technical professionals
- Rehabilitation professionals and equipment
- Health practitioners
- Technical medical practitioners
- Senior administrative management
- Professional information and communication
- Professionals
- Executives of commercial management
- Bank executives, insurance and real estate
- Executives
- Staff of agricultural production
- Other Fishing and maritime and river navigation
- Staff of the shell and Public Works
- Staff finishing work
- Operating Engineers land transport
- Operating Engineers maneuver, civil engineering and agricultural
- Logistics personnel (handling, management and operation of transport)
- Accompanying personnel transport
- Staff of mechanical engineering and metalworking
- Staff of electrical and electronic
- Maintenance personnel, maintenance
- Drivers installation chemical, power generation ...
- Drivers installation of metallurgy and materials
- Drivers installation of heavy industry of wood and paper and cardboard
- Staff functions for cross-sectoral process industries
- Staff of flexible materials industries (textiles, clothing, leather)
- Staff of the printing industry
- Staff Industry Furniture and timber
- Personal Power
- Staff handcrafted clothing, leather and textile
- Staff of craft materials
- Staff various craft
- Extension agents, machine
- Supervisory staff maintenance
- Technicians for the preparation of production
- Manufacturing technicians, control
- Installation technicians, maintenance
- Frames preparation techniques of production
- Technical managers of production
- Technical sales managers and maintenance
- Supervisors, technicians and engineers of agriculture ...
- Supervisors, technicians and building engineers ...
- Technicians and managers of transportation and logistics

== See also ==
- Titre (degree)
- Commission nationale de la certification professionnelle
- Education in France
